= Gustaf Algernon Stierneld =

Swedish Prime Minister for Foreign Affairs

His Excellency Baron Gustaf Algernon Stierneld Lord of the Realm RoKavKMO
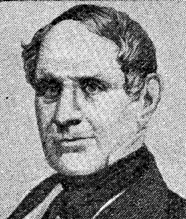
- Portrait

Prime Minister for Foreign Affairs
- In office 30 January 1838 – 11 July 1842
- Preceded by: Adolf Göran Mörner
- Succeeded by: Albrecht Elof Ihre
- In office 10 April 1848 – 8 September 1856
- Preceded by: Albrecht Elof Ihre
- Succeeded by: Elias Lagerheim

Personal details
- Born: 12 July 1791 Stockholm, Kingdom of Sweden
- Died: 14 November 1868 (aged 77) Stockholm, Kingdom of Sweden
- Spouses: Dorotea Anna Josefina von Engeström (m. 1803; died 1823) Jacquette Vilhelmina Gyldenstolpe (m. 1828)
- Children: 4
- Parent(s): Adolf Ludvig Stierneld; Charlotte Gyldenstolpe
- Relatives: Stierneld family
- Education: Kiel University; University of Edinburgh; Uppsala University

Gustaf Nils Algernon Adolf Stierneld (12 July 1791 – 14 November 1868) was a Swedish nobleman and non-political politician, serving twice as Prime Minister for Foreign Affairs during an important period in Swedish politics. He was the only child of Adolf Ludvig Stierneld, one of the most famous document forgers in Swedish history.

== Biography ==
Gustaf Algernon Stierneld was born to Adolf Ludvig Stierneld, one of the best and most prolific document forgers in Swedish history, and his wife Charlotte Gyldenstolpe, daughter of Nils Philip Gyldenstolpe. He attended the Caroline College of Brunswick between 1803–1806, prior to his studies at Kiel University in 1806, the University of Edinburgh in 1807, and Uppsala University in 1810 respectively.

On 26 October 1811, he held office as Second Secretary of the King's Cabinet for Foreign Correspondence and served the chancellery of Charles, Crown Prince of Sweden during the German Campaign of 1813 and the French Campaign of 1814. He participated in the Conferences of Trachenberg and Frankfurt, as well as the Peace Congress of Kiel; the latter of which resulted in the Treaty of Kiel, where Frederick VI, King of Denmark ceded the Kingdom of Norway to Charles XIII, King of Sweden in return for Swedish Pomerania. Between 1818–1828 and 1838–1842, he served as Envoy of the Kingdom of Sweden to the United Kingdom of Great Britain and Ireland and Prime Minister for Foreign Affairs respectively, offices which granted him the title of "Lord of the Realm". Due to political strife however, the office was de facto served by Albrecht Elof Ihre since 5 September 1840.

He married Dorotea Anna Josefina von Engeström, daughter of Lars von Engeström, on 15 November 1803 in Stockholm. They only had one child: Charlotta Rosalia Maria Dorotea. When his wife died on 29 October 1823 in Hyères, he remarried with his cousin Jacquette Vilhelmina Gyldenstolpe, daughter of Carl Edvard Gyldenstolpe, on 21 April 1828 in Stockholm. They three children: Charlotta Vilhelmina Ulrika, Charlotta Lovisa Aurora and Emilia Aurora Charlotta. He was the owner of Ulvåsa Manor and Händelö Manor, both located in Östergötland, and when he died on 14 November 1868, the estates was inherited to his wife.

== Honours ==
=== National ===
- Sweden: Knight of the Order of the Polar Star (7 October 1817)
- Sweden: Knight and Commander of the Orders of His Majesty the King (7 May 1838)

=== Foreign ===
- Portugal: Grand Cross of the Military Order of Christ
- Russia: Knight 2nd Class of the Order of Saint Anna (1813)
- Prussia: Knight 3rd Class of the Order of the Red Eagle (November 1813)
- Norway: Grand Cross of the Order of Saint Olav (5 September 1848)
- Denmark: Knight of the Order of the Elephant (2 October 1848)
- France: Grand Cross of the Legion of Honour (24 December 1855)
