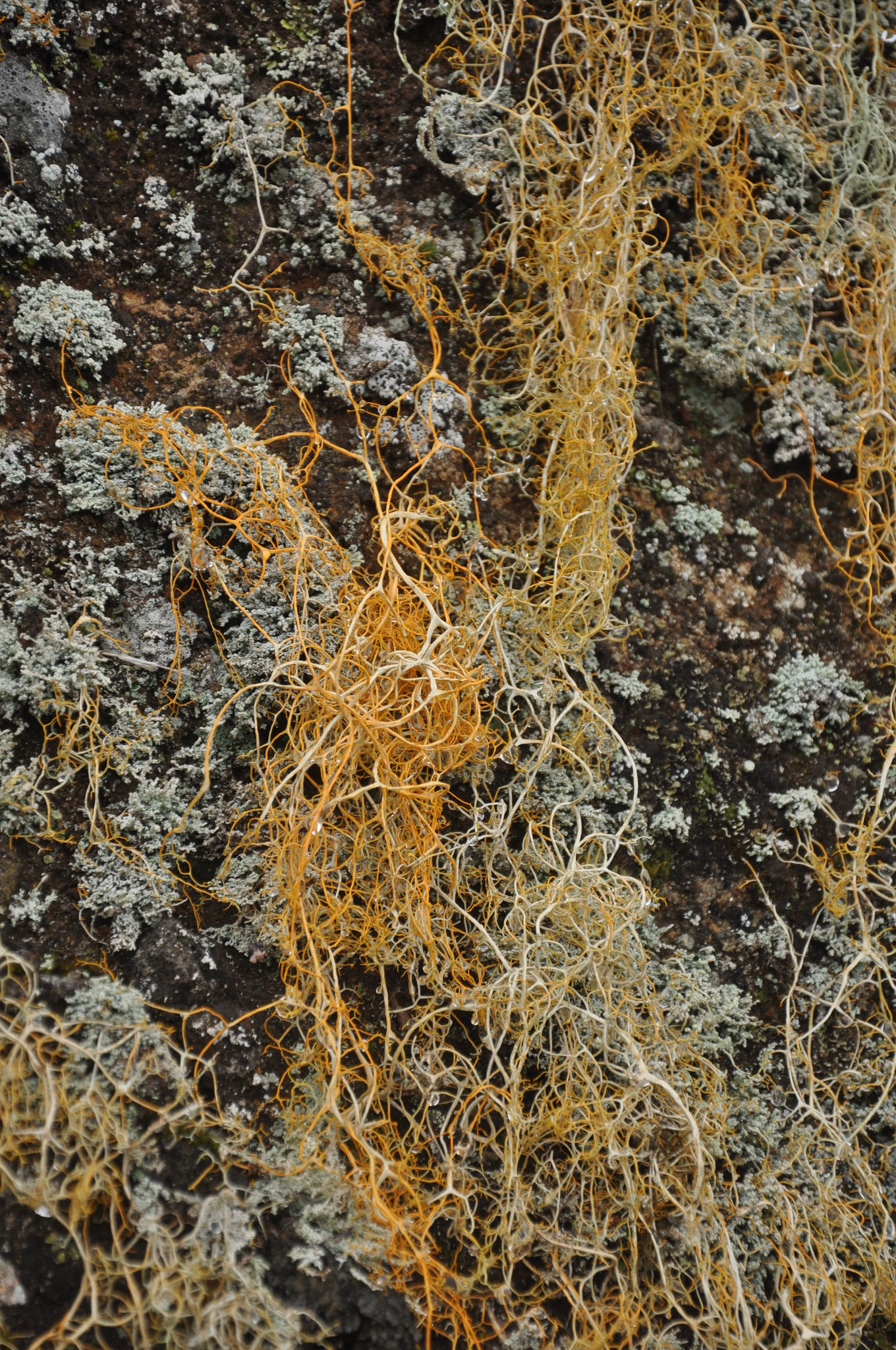

Scientific classification
- Domain: Eukaryota
- Kingdom: Fungi
- Division: Ascomycota
- Class: Lecanoromycetes
- Order: Lecanorales
- Family: Parmeliaceae
- Genus: Lethariella
- Species: L. canariensis

Binomial name
- Lethariella canariensis (Ach.) Krog (1976)

Synonyms
- List: Alectoria canariensis Ach. 1810); Parmelia canariensis (Ach.) Spreng. (1827); Evernia canariensis (Ach.) Mont. (1840); Chlorea canariensis (Ach.) Nyl. (1857); Nylanderaria canariensis (Ach.) Kuntze (1891); Letharia canariensis (Ach.) Hue (1899); Rhytidocaulon canariense (Ach.) Elenkin (1916); Usnea canariensis (Ach.) Du Rietz (1926)

= Lethariella canariensis =

Species of lichen

Lethariella canariensis is a species of fruticose lichen in the family Parmeliaceae. It occurs on the Canary Islands.

== Taxonomy ==
The lichen was first formally described as a new species in 1810 by Swedish lichenologist Erik Acharius, as Alectoria canariensis. In his original Latin protologue, Acharius characterised the species as having a compressed, branching orange thallus with dichotomous and trichotomous divisions, with the ultimate branches being terete (cylindrical) and capillaceous (hair-like). He noted its habitat as the Canary Islands and Fortunate Isles. Acharius described the thallus as being nine inches to a foot in length, yellowish tending towards reddish, compressed, neither rigid nor soft, and smooth. He observed that the lichen turned a croceous (saffron-yellow) colour when chewed or placed in water, and that it had no distinct odour. Acharius considered this a true and distinct species of Alectoria that should not be overlooked in classification. The description cites earlier documentation by Johann Jacob Dillenius in Historia Muscorum and Leonard Plukenet in Almagestum Botanicum. After having been transferred to several genera in its taxonomic history, it was one of six species placed in the newly circumscribed genus Lethariella by Hildur Krog in 1976. It is in the subgenus Chlorea of genus Lethariella. In this subgenus, Lethariella canariensis is distinguished by three key features: its medulla lacks aromatic lichen products, it has a smooth thallus surface, and it has a distribution confined exclusively to Macaronesia.

== Chemistry ==
Several allelochemicals (biochemicals that influence other organisms) have been isolated and identified from Lethariella canariensis, including atranol, chloroatranol, hematommic acid, chlorohematommic aci, methyl hematommate, methyl chlorohematommate, ethyl hematommate, ethyl chlorohematommate, methyl β-orsellinate, atranorin, chloroatranorin, and usnic acid.
