= List of works by François Boucher =

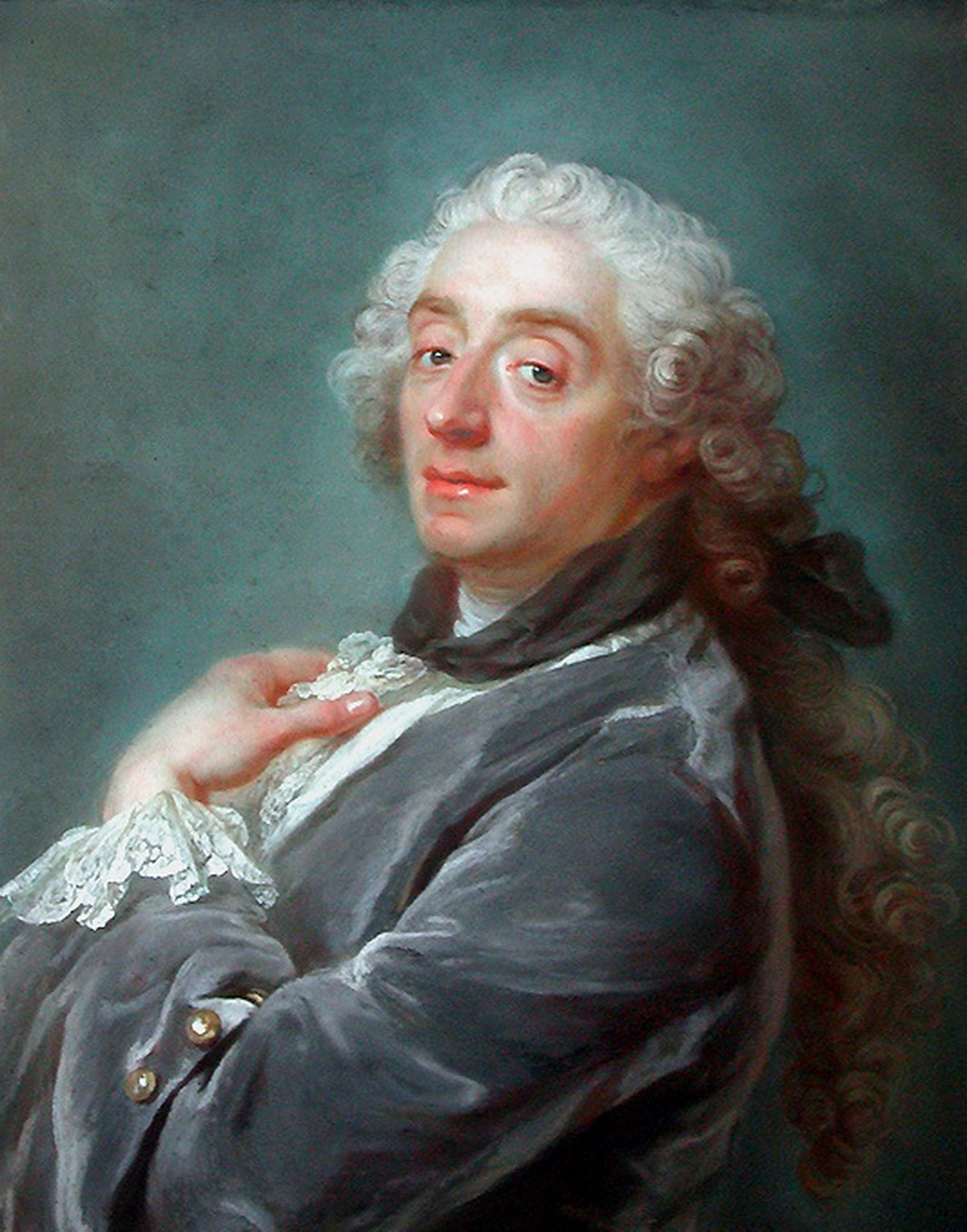
Portrait of François Boucher by Gustaf Lundberg (1741)

This is an incomplete list of works by François Boucher.

- Death of Meleager (c. 1727), Los Angeles County Museum of Art
- Project for a Cartouche (c. 1727), Los Angeles County Museum of Art
- Imaginary Landscape with the Palatine Hill from Campo Vaccino (1734), Metropolitan Museum of Art
- Monument to Mignard (c. 1735), Los Angeles County Museum of Art
- Venus and Mercury Instructing Cupid (1738), Los Angeles County Museum of Art
- Cupid Wounding Psyche (1741), Los Angeles County Museum of Art
- Les Confidences Pastorales (c. 1745), Los Angeles County Museum of Art
- Jeanne-Antoinette Poisson, Marquise de Pompadour (1750), Harvard Art Museums
- The Interrupted Sleep (1750), Metropolitan Museum of Art
- The Toilette of Venus (1751), Metropolitan Museum of Art
- Shepherd Boy Playing Bagpipes (c. 1754), Museum of Fine Arts, Boston
- Landscape with a Watermill (1755), National Gallery
- Venus in the Workshop of Vulcan (1757), Yale University Art Gallery
- Pan and Syrinx (1759), National Gallery,
- Angelica and Medoro (1763), Metropolitan Museum of Art
- Jupiter, in the Guise of Diana, and Callisto (1763), Metropolitan Museum of Art
- Virgin and Child with the Young Saint John the Baptist and Angels (1765), Metropolitan Museum of Art
- Halt at the Spring (1765), Museum of Fine Arts, Boston
- Return from Market (1767), Museum of Fine Arts, Boston
- Shepherd's Idyll (1768), Metropolitan Museum of Art
- Washerwomen (1768), Metropolitan Museum of Art
