= Adolf Ludvig Stierneld =

Swedish nobleman

High Well-born Baron Adolf Ludvig Stierneld KNO RCXIII:sO LSkS HedLVHAA
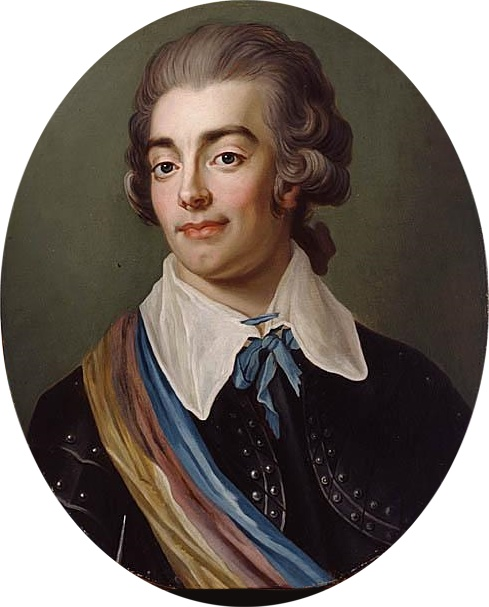
- Portrait by Jakob Björck, 1782.
- Born: 1 September 1755; Jakob Parish, Uppland, Kingdom of Sweden
- Died: 31 July 1835 (aged 79); Gripsholm Castle, Södermanland, Kingdom of Sweden
- Spouse: Charlotte Gyldenstolpe (m. 1790; died 1825)
- Children: Gustaf Algernon Stierneld
- Family: Stierneld family

Adolf Ludvig Stierneld, Baron Stierneld (1 September 1755 – 31 July 1835) was a Swedish nobleman, courtier and collector of historical documents. Recent historical research has revealed him to be one of best and most prolific document forgers in Swedish history.

== Biography ==
He was the son of Samuel Gustaf Stierneld and Kristina Brigitta Falker. In 1781, his father inscribed him to the military to become captain of the Royal Life Regiment of Horse. From 1778 onward, he served as courtier to Sophia Magdalena, Queen consort of Sweden.

Stierneld appeared among the opposition to Gustavus III, King of Sweden in the Riksdag of 1786 and 1789, where he was one of the leaders of the nobility. During the Riksdag of 1789, he belonged to the members of the noble opposition against the absolutist reform of the Union and Security Act, and consequently belonged to the opposition arrested by the monarch during the Riksdag. When the others arrested were released, however, he was detained because of his connections to the Russian ambassador, and was placed in the Varberg Fortress. In 1790, he was released to marry his fiancée Charlotte Gyldenstolpe, a courtier of Hedwig Elisabeth Charlotte, Duchess of Holstein-Gottorp and a daughter of the king's favorite Nils Philip Gyldenstolpe; the connections of his spouse secured his rehabilitation, and he was appointed court chamberlain in 1792.

Through his position as governor of Gripsholm Castle, Stierneld started the collection of portraits at the castle which was eventually to become the National Portrait Gallery of Sweden; he started and organized the collection after the death of Gustavus III in 1792, and the collection became officially inaugurated in 1822. In 1821, he became an honorary member of the Royal Swedish Academy of Letters, History and Antiquities. In his capacity as director of the museum collection, however, he reportedly misidentified several portraits.

During his later life, Stierneld was also a collector of historical documents. In 1821, he became one of the founders of the Royal Society for Publication of Manuscripts on Scandinavian History, in which he served as chairperson several times and also published several essays. In this capacity, he forged, misquoted, manipulated and wrongly interpenetrated numerous historical documents to trace the genealogy of his own family to royalty and give his ancestors a more prominent place in history. One of his inventions is the fictitious person Brita Persdotter Karth.
