= Jakob Björck =

Swedish portrait painter and copyist (1727/1728–1793)

- Born: 1727/1728; Sweden
- Died: February 1793 (aged 65–66); Stockholm, Sweden
- Occupations: Painter and copyist

Jakob Björck (1727/1728 – 20 February 1793) was a Swedish painter and copyist who specialised in portrait painting.

== Biography ==
In the early stages of his career, Björck is reported to have been a pupil of Johan Henrik Scheffel; however, this is uncertain. He worked in the studio of pastel painter Gustav Lundberg between 1750 and 1774. In 1774, Björck married Cicilia Gren (1723 or 1724–1811).

== In Lundberg's studio 1750–1774 ==
Oil copies of Lundberg's pastels are usually attributed to Björck, despite several other assistants being employed in the studio at the time: Per Cogell (later a city painter in Lyon), Adolf Hall, Jonas Forsslund and a pastel painter named Pettersson. In addition, Lundberg had so many orders at times that he delegated the copy orders to other artists – Johan Henrik Scheffel and Fredrik Brander. Moreover, it seems that Ulrika Pasch, Olof Arenius, the court miniaturist John George Henrichsen as well as Niklas Lafrensen the Elder all had access to Lundberg's originals.

It was well known at the time that pastel paintings are sensitive to light, moisture and touch, wherefore it was common to order oil copies from the outset. An example of this can be seen in the Swedish Count Carl Gustaf Tessin's diary, into which he had copied the following receipt from Lundberg:

Un portrait original en pastel de Son Excellence Monseigneur le Comte de Tessin avec cadre et glace Dlr cuivre 1.300

Un dito de Madame La Comtesse de Tessin 1.300

Deux copies en huile du Portrait de son Excellence à 200 d 400

Deux cadres pour les dites copies 300

Translated from French:

One original portrait in pastel of His Excellence my Lord the Count of Tessin with frame and glass copper : 1,300 talers

One ditto of Madame the Countess of Tessin : 1,300

Two copies in oil of the Portrait of His Excellence, at 200 talers each : 400

Two frames for the aforesaid copies : 300

The portraits being referred to are one of Tessin in a riksrådsdräkt (a formal attire worn by the Privy Council of Sweden) and one of his wife Ulrika Lovisa in a yellow dress and a black lace mantilla. Of the former there are ten copies registered in Svenska Porträttarkivet, all of which are attributed to Björck; same goes for four copies of the latter, which had apparently been ordered at a different time.

Björck also made pastel copies, but there are no known works which could with certainty be attributed to him. Upon the end of his employment at the studio, Lundberg thanked him with a small cabinet of pastel sticks and a copper plate collection as recognition for "24 years of faithful service".

== On his own since 1774 ==
From 1774 Björck had his own production, where he mainly copied the works of others, such as one of Jean-Baptiste Oudry's door lintels in the Royal Palace, Hunting dog with two grouse, which he signed Iacob Björck px on the stretcher bar. He had the opportunity to paint King Gustav III in the Life Guards' uniform with the revolutionaries' armband and partly in Swedish costume, both in magnificent royal frames. In general, however, it is assumed that he copied from the now-lost or destroyed works by Lundberg. Björck had the title HofCopist, probably at Lundberg's insistence in order to avoid problems with the painting office.

His own style is rough compared to Lundberg's light elegance. This is evident from the portraits of King Gustav III and Adolf Ludvig Stierneld below in the gallery. Over time, his production became purely artisanal and the copies of the many stereotypical portraits of Lundberg's last days are consistently dry and lifeless. The portraits of Gustavus Gyllenborg, his wife Petronella Hultman and the copy of Lundberg's self-portraits in the below gallery can be seen as an example of this. Björck's copies of Lundberg's portraits during the 21st century sold for anything from 20,000 kr to 180,000 kr, depending on how decorated the frame was. Portraits of women and children are generally valued higher than men's portraits.

== Gallery ==
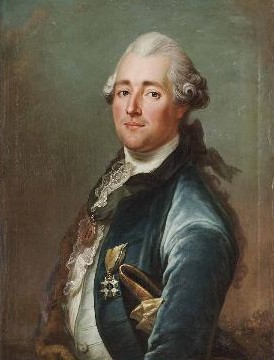
Portrait of Jacob Johan Anckarström the Elder

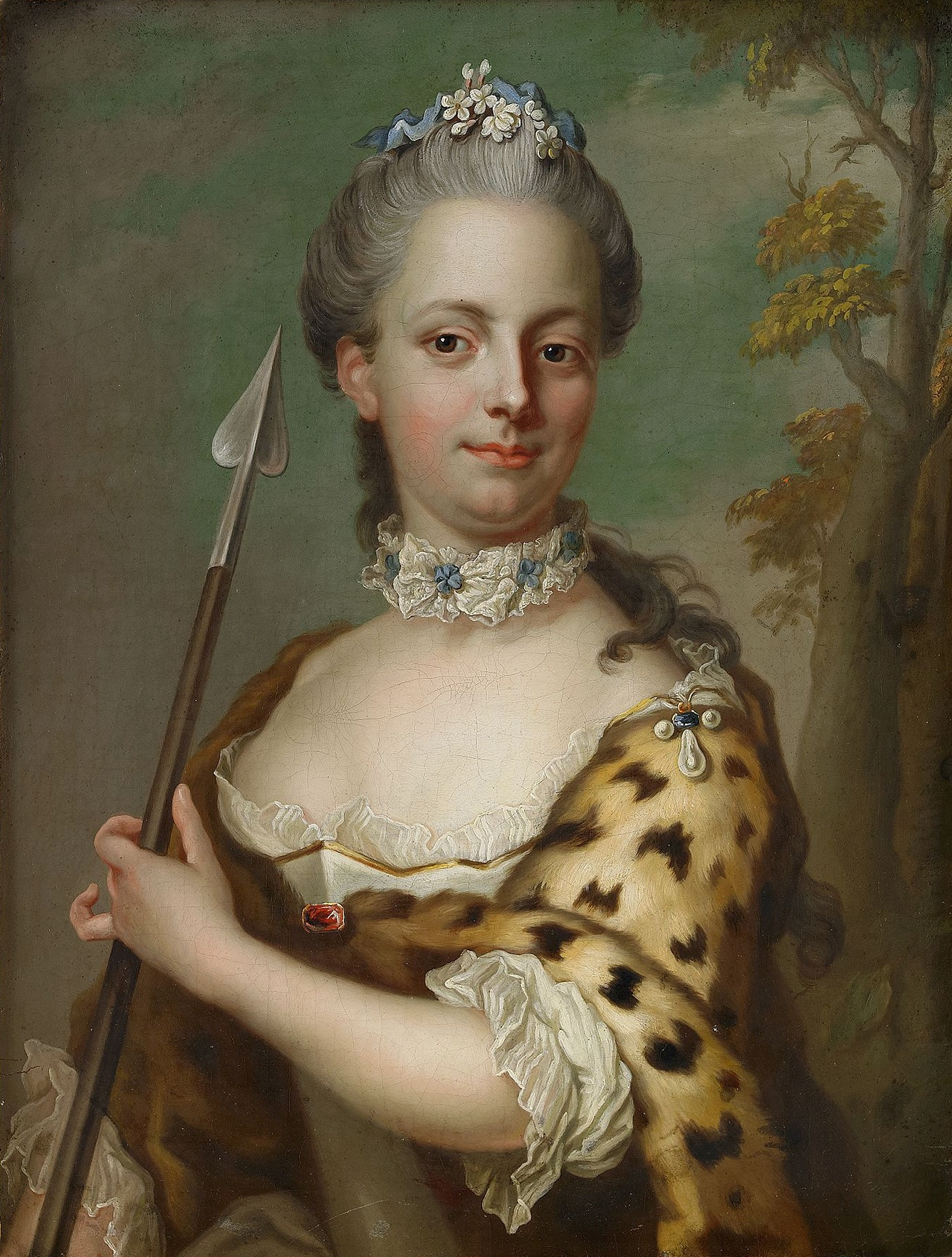
Portrait of Charlotte Du Rietz af Hedensberg

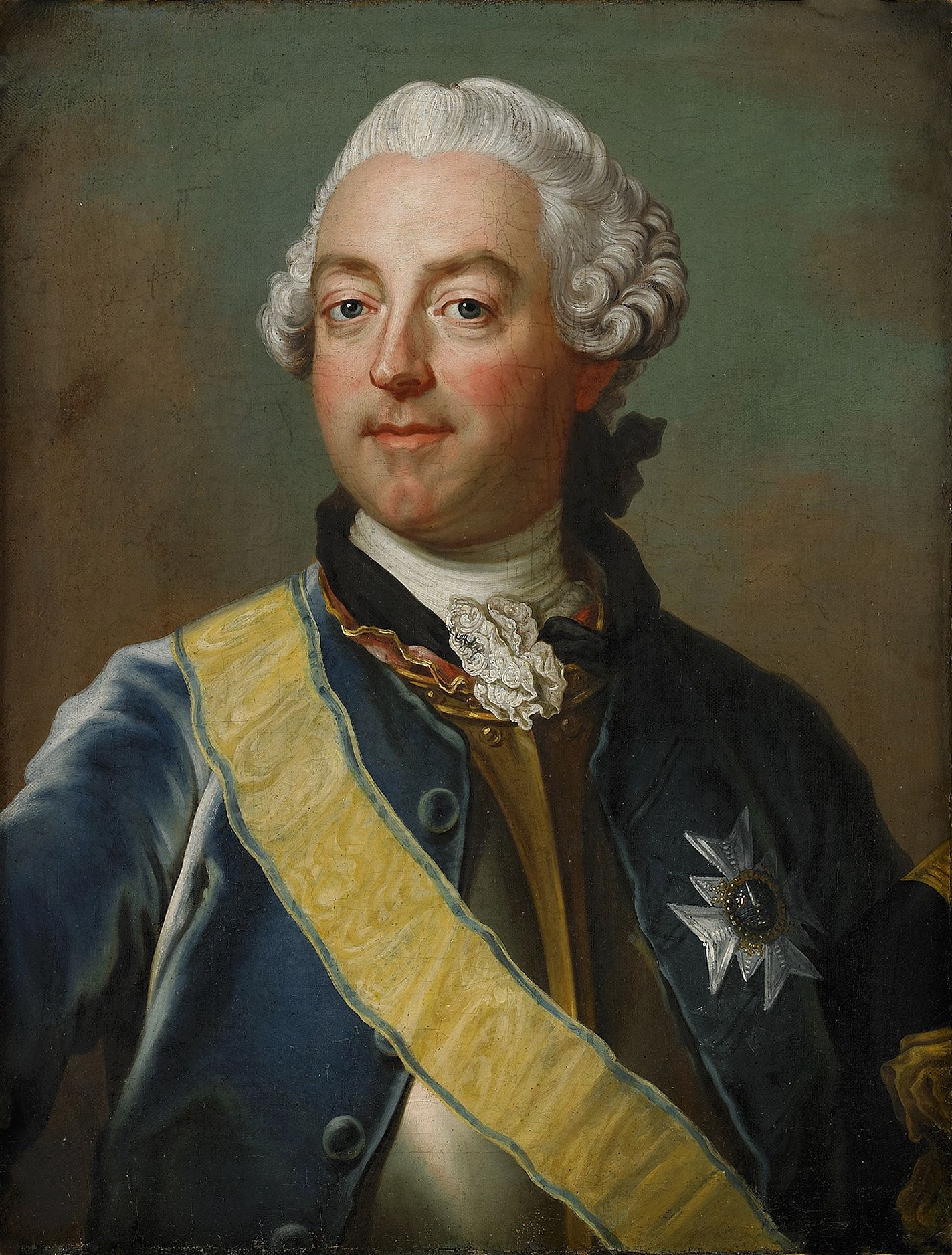
Portrait of Anders Rudolf Du Rietz af Hedensberg

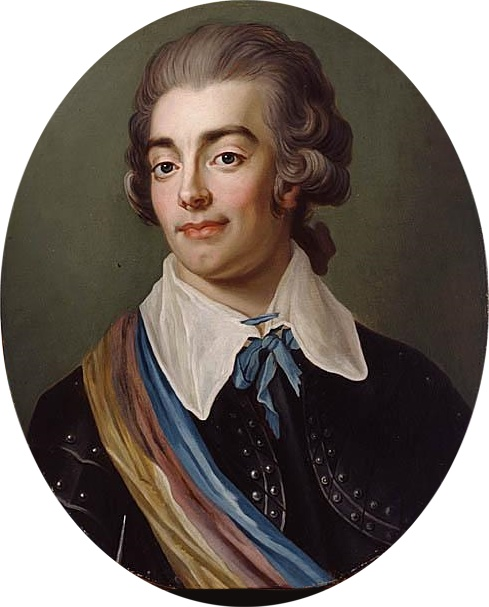
Portrait of Adolf Ludvig Stierneld

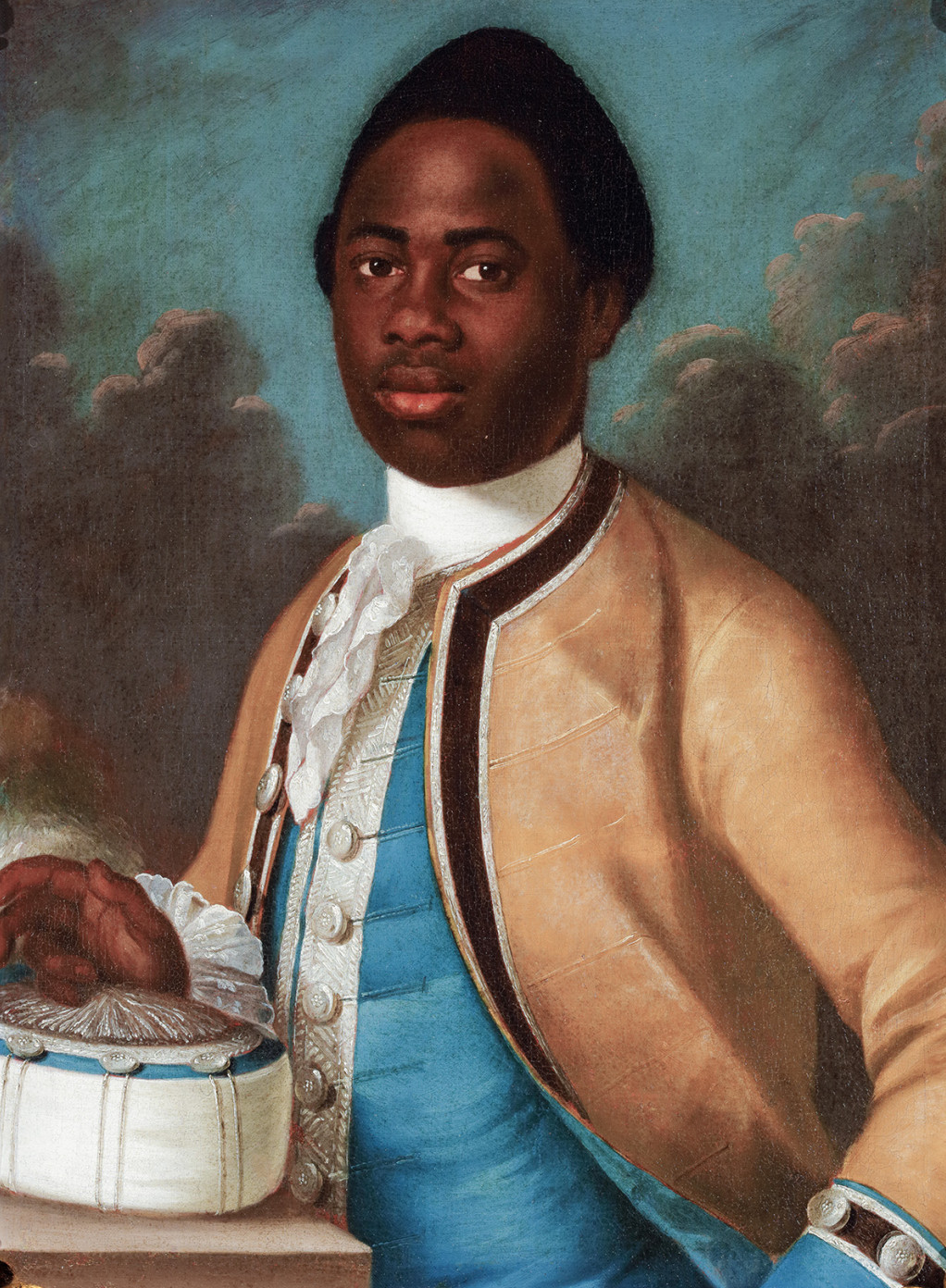
Portrait of Gustav Badin

== Sources ==
- "Jakob Björck". Nordisk familjebok (1st ed.). 1878 – via Project Runeberg.
- Herman Hofberg (1906). "Jakob Björck". Svenskt Biografiskt handlexikon (2nd ed.) – via Project Runeberg.
- Oscar Levertin; Gustaf Lundberg - en studie (Ljus, Stockholm 1902)
- Merit Laine and Carolina Brown; Gustaf Lundberg 1695-1786 (Nationalmuseum 2006)
- Boo von Malmborg; Svensk Porträttkonst (Allhems Förlag och Nationalmuseum 1978)
- Carl Gustaf Tessin; Dagbok 1760 och 1761 (Handskrift, Kungl. Biblioteket)
- Index över svenska porträtt; Sixten Strömbom (Nationalmuseum 1939)
- Svenskt Biografiskt Lexikon (SBL) 1924, article by Gunnar Mascoll Silfverstolpe
