= Anders Rudolf du Rietz =

Swedish general and politician (1722–1792)

Lieutenant general Count Anders Rudolf du Rietz
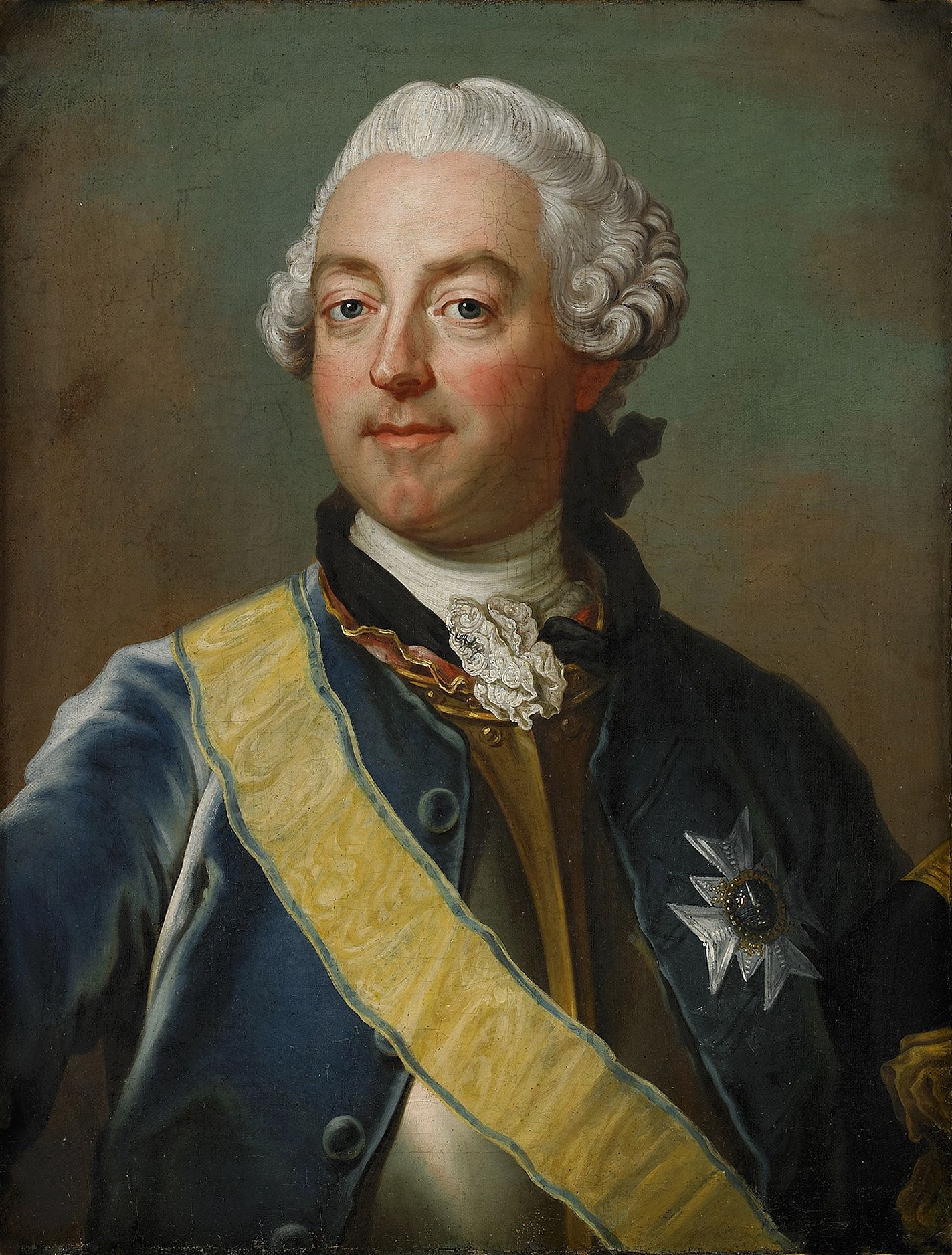
- Portrait by Jakob Björck
- Born: Anders Rudolf du Rietz; 5 February 1722
- Died: 21 October 1792 (aged 70); Hedensberg, Västmanland, Sweden
- Spouse: Charlotta de Geer (m. 1765)
- Relatives: Carl Magnus du Rietz (father); Ebba Katarina Horn (mother)
- Military career
- Allegiance: Sweden
- Branch: Swedish Army
- Service years: 1741–1789
- Rank: Lieutenant general
- Units: Svea Life Guards; Södermanland Regiment; Hälsinge Regiment
- Commands: Hälsinge Regiment
- Conflicts: Russo-Swedish War (1741–1743); Pomeranian War; Russo-Swedish War (1788–1790)
- Awards: Commander with the Great Cross of the Order of the Sword

Anders Rudolf du Rietz (pronounced [dyrié]; 5 February 1722 – 21 October 1792 in Hedensberg, Västmanland) was a Swedish count, lieutenant-general, commander grand cross of the Order of the Sword, County Governor and politician.

== Family ==
du Rietz was the son of lieutenant-colonel Carl Magnus du Rietz and his wife countess Ebba Katarina Horn. Ebba Katarina was the daughter of Henning Rudolf Horn and his wife Helena Sperling.

== Life ==
du Rietz began his military career as a lieutenant in the Life Guards and was sent to the Finnish front in the Russo-Swedish War (1741–1743) with that regiment. After that war he rose slowly through the officer ranks, reaching major in the Södermanland Regiment, and then went to join the Pomeranian War in north Germany from 1758 to 1760. He won distinction in this war, capturing the Anclamen Feler fort, protecting the Swedish siege of Peenemünde and obtaining the advantageous capitulation of the Prussian forces at Demmin by Field Marshal Johann von Lehwaldt.

From 1760 onwards he concentrated more on politics, becoming an outstanding member of the Caps faction and elected to the 'secret committee' in 1760 and 1765. He was not, however, in the Riksråd, although he was nominated to it. During this political career he was also promoted to colonel and to become head of the Hälsinge Regiment, and shortly afterwards was sent to bear the Swedish official congratulations on Catherine II of Russia's accession.

In 1770 he was made major general and in 1772 governor of Gothenburg. He managed to retain his post as governor after Gustav III's coup d'état and managed to make his peace both with Gustav III and the prevailing new order. As a reward he was in 1776 appointed lieutenant general and in 1778 promoted to the nobility as a count. Towards the end of his life, he was suspected of laziness in the defence of Gothenburg during the Russo-Swedish War (1788–1790), though Gustav III arrived in time to save the city.

== Marriage and issue ==
In 1765 he married countess Charlotta de Geer. They had one son, who predeceased Anders.
