= Albrecht Elof Ihre =

Swedish diplomat and politician

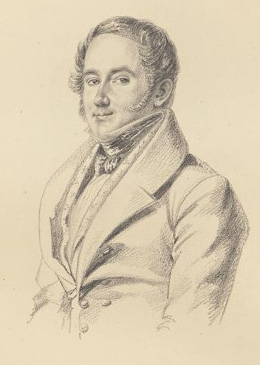
Albrecht Elof Ihre. Drawing by Maria Röhl (1833)

Baron Albrecht Elof Ihre (6 October 1797 – 9 August 1877) was a Swedish diplomat and politician who served as Swedish-Norwegian prime minister of foreign affairs 1840-1848 (acting 1840–1842).

Ihre was employed in the Swedish Ministry for Foreign Affairs from 1823, serving as secretary of the Swedish legation in Constantinople from 1824, and chargé d'affaires there from 1827. He was appointed state secretary for foreign affairs in 1831. Ihre became Swedish minister of education and ecclesiastical affairs from 1840, and also served as acting Swedish-Norwegian prime minister of foreign affairs 1840–1842, and was Swedish-Norwegian prime minister of foreign affairs 1842–1848.

Ihre, who was a grandson of the philologist Johan Ihre, was elected a member of the Royal Swedish Academy of Sciences in 1842, was awarded the title of baron in 1843 and a knighthood of the Order of the Seraphim in 1846. He was elected a member of the Swedish Academy in 1849, having previously declined twice, but did not take his seat and resigned from the academy in 1859.

== See Also ==
- List of knights of the Order of the Seraphim

Political offices
Preceded by Gustaf Algernon Stierneld	Prime Minister for Foreign Affairs; 1842–1848	Succeeded by Gustaf Algernon Stierneld
Cultural offices
Preceded by Carl Gustaf von Brinkman	Swedish Academy, Chair No 3; 1848-1859	Succeeded by Johan Börjesson
