= Lethariella sinensis =

Scientific classification
- Domain: Eukaryota
- Kingdom: Fungi
- Division: Ascomycota
- Class: Lecanoromycetes
- Order: Lecanorales
- Family: Parmeliaceae
- Genus: Lethariella
- Species: L. sinensis

Binomial name
- Lethariella sinensis J.C.Wei & Y.M.Jiang (1982)

Synonyms
- Lethariella mieheana Obermayer (1997)

Species of lichen

Lethariella sinensis is a species of fruticose lichen in the family Parmeliaceae. It was formally described as a new species in 1982 by Chinese lichenologists Jiang-Chun Wei and Yu-Mei Jiang. The type specimen was collected from Qamdo (eastern Tibet) at an altitude of 4,300 m (14,100 ft); there, it was found growing on the branch of Thuja. It is an orange, long pendant lichen with a reticulate surface. In 2001, Walter Obermayer showed that the holotype specimen of Lethariella sinensis comprised two chemically unique taxa: one with psoromic acid and the other with norstictic acid. The former was chosen as the lectotype, and as a consequence, Lethariella mieheana became synonymous with L. sinensis.

Lethariella sinensis is one of three species of Lethariella that is used as a purported health-promoting tea in Yunnan, China. Thin-layer chromatography analysis shows the presence of the following lichen products in the thallus: atranorin, canarione, psoromic acid, 2'-O-demethylpsoromic acid, and traces of gyrophoric acid.
