= Hedvig Ulrika De la Gardie =

Swedish lady-in-waiting (1761–1832)

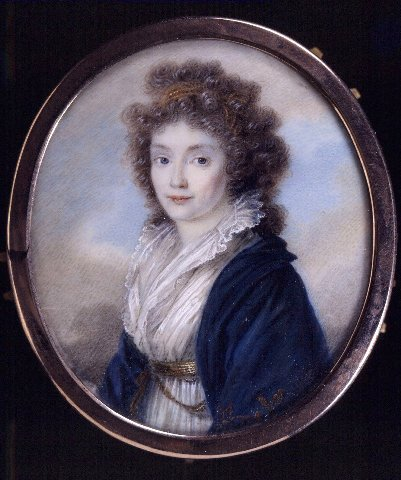
Hedvig Ulrika De la Gardie, 1790s

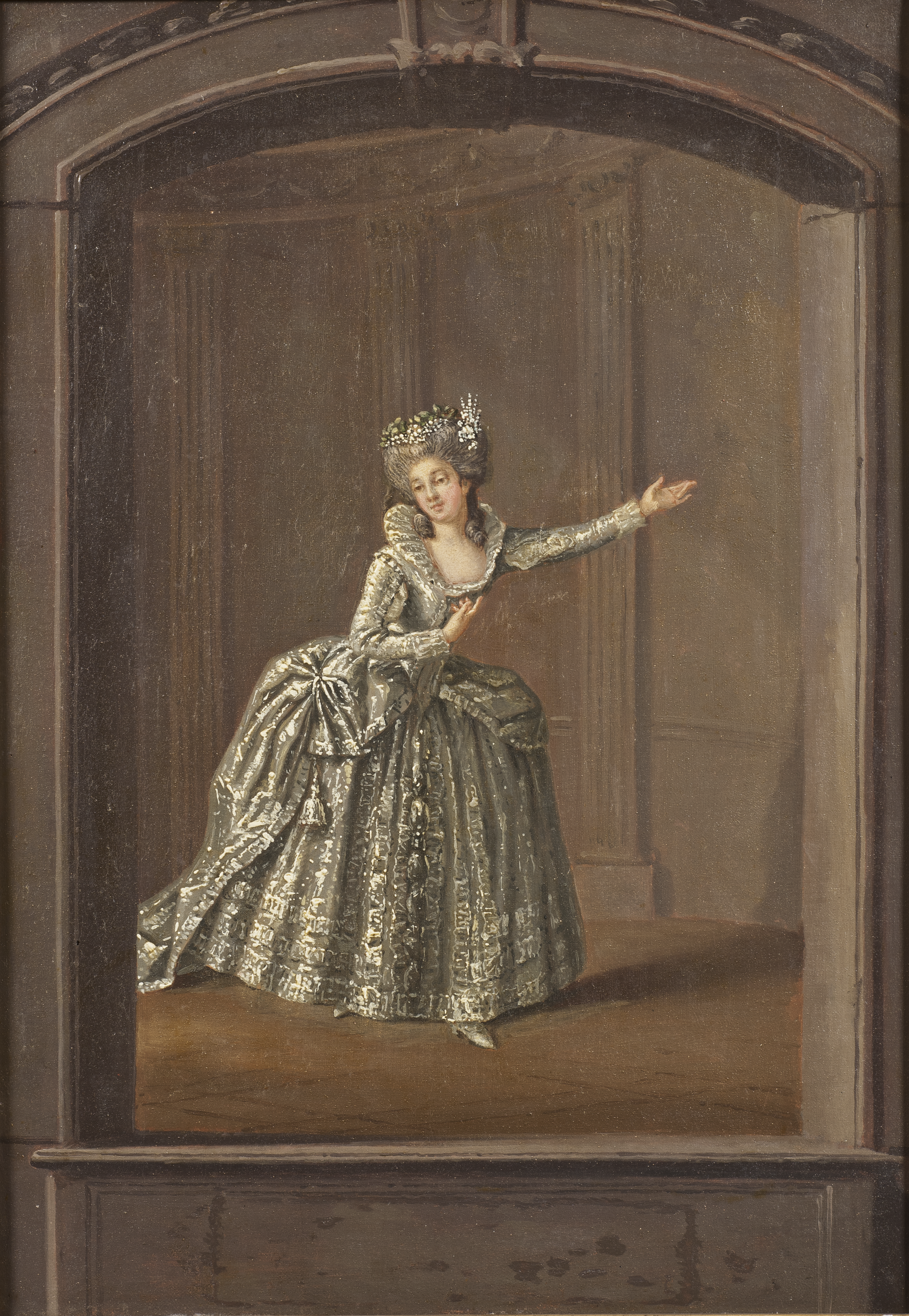
Hedvig Ulrika De la Gardie on stage in the Amateur Theatre of Gustav III, Pehr Hilleström, Nationalmuseum

Hedvig Ulrika De la Gardie (29 November 1761 in Stockholm, Sweden – 7 February 1832 in Stockholm), was a Swedish lady-in-waiting. She was married to Gustaf Mauritz Armfelt. She was the head governess of the Swedish royal children in 1799–1803.

== Biography ==
=== Early life ===
Hedvig Ulrika De la Gardie was the daughter of count Carl Julius De la Gardie and countess Magdalena Christina Stenbock. Her mother was Mistress of the Robes to Princess Sophie Albertine of Sweden, and she herself was a maid of honor to the Queen, Sophia Magdalena of Denmark. She was a participator in the amateur theatre society of King Gustav III at the royal court.

She was married on 7 August 1785 at Drottningholm Palace to the King's favorite Gustaf Mauritz Armfelt. The marriage was arranged by the King. Armfelt was said to have married her because of her rank and the status of her surname: he treated her with respect but never loved her and had a parallel relationship with Magdalena Rudenschöld. Hedvig Ulrika, on the other hand, was intensely in love with him, and remained loyal to him. She was described as silent, serious and reliable.

=== First exile ===
In 1792, she followed Armfelt to Naples. She was entrusted some of his papers and buried them in the garden, but the servant who buried them sold the documents and replaced them with a blank paper, which contributed to the exposure of the Armfelt conspiracy. An order of arrest was warranted on her husband, and because of it, she was herself detained several times, in Rome and Venice, during her travel from Italy to relatives in Riga in Livonia in 1794. She was allowed to keep her pension as lady-in-waiting and was given a travel sum by Duke Charles. Her husband was sentenced to death in absentia for treason, and she was banned from Sweden and from using his name. The property of her spouse in Sweden was confiscated, but as was customary, it was given to his children. As Armfelt was sentenced to death, Hedvig Ulrika was the legal guardian of their children rather than him, and was therefore given control of his Swedish property. However, she could not manage it because of her exile, so she named Axel von Fersen the Younger as the agent of her affairs in Sweden. She remained convinced of her husband's innocence, at least officially.

The couple resided under the protection of Catherine the Great in Kaluga. Hedvig Ulrika acted as the agent of her husband on several occasions. She visited Paul I of Russia to ask for better conditions in 1796, but failed. When Gustav IV Adolf of Sweden was declared of legal majority in 1797, she visited the Swedish monarch and achieved permission for her to return to Sweden, to use her husband's name to allow Armfelt to live anywhere except Sweden and Russia and to stop all active persecution toward him. She then managed to get permission from the czar to allow Armfelt to leave Russia, and in 1798, she traveled with him to Berlin.

During her visit in Sweden, she consulted the fortune-teller Ulrica Arfvidsson about the future of her exiled spouse, upon which she was told that her days of sorrow would soon be over, and that all would be well for her spouse.

=== Return to Sweden ===
In 1799, Hedvig returned to Sweden, where she was appointed head of the court of the royal children. She accepted the appointment on condition that Armfelt was allowed to return to Sweden. She was granted her wish, which was realized in 1800, after she had threatened to resign if the agreement was not honored. Armfelt was duly informed that his exile had been lifted of consideration of his wife and mother. Hedvig was greatly admired for her loyalty toward Armfelt, while he was not considered to be worthy of it. She left her position at court in 1803 with the customary title of Excellency, and was succeeded as royal governess by Charlotte Stierneld.

=== Second exile ===
In March 1811, Armfelt was exiled by the Crown Prince and de facto regent Charles John on suspicion of plots against the Crown Prince. Hedvig Ulrika De la Gardie negotiated with the Crown Prince through the Queen for Armfelt, but without success. In April 1811, Armfelt was exiled from Sweden and emigrated to Russia. Because she had expressed her rage about the verdict, the Crown Prince included her in the exile and deprived her of her pension as courtier, which was however disputed by the Queen. She joined her spouse in 1812. Before her departure, the Crown Prince surprised her at a visit to Lars von Engeström and told her that he regretted the exile of Armfelt and that he had been mistaken in him and felt nothing but respect for him. Hedvig Ulrika De la Gardie was given the portraits of the Russian empresses, was given and served as lady-in-waiting (Dame du palais et dame a portrait) to the Empress in 1820–1822. She spent her last years in Sweden.

Hedvig Ulrika De la Gardie was given the (Lesser) Order of Saint Catherine in 1814.

== Sources ==
- Hedvig Ulrika De la Gardie i Wilhelmina Stålberg, Anteckningar om svenska qvinnor (1864)
- Cecilia af Klercker (1920). Hedvig Elisabeth Charlottas dagbok IV 1794-1794. P.A. Norstedt & Söners förlag Stockholm. sid. 194, 313
- Cecilia af Klercker (1927). Hedvig Elisabeth Charlottas dagbok VI 1797–1799. P.A. Norstedt & Söners förlag Stockholm. sid. 11, 33, 239
- Cecilia af Klercker (1936). Hedvig Elisabeth Charlottas dagbok VII 1800–1806. P.A. Norstedt & Söners förlag Stockholm. sid. 50–51, 260, 263
- Göran Alm och Rebecka Millhagen: Drottningholms slott. Bd 2, Från Gustav III till Carl XVI Gustaf / [utgiven] i samarbete med Kungl. Hovstaterna och Statens fastighetsverk (2010)
- Cecilia af Klercker (1942). Hedvig Elisabeth Charlottas dagbok IX (1812–1817). Stockholm: Norstedt & Söners förlag

Court offices
Preceded by Hedvig Sofia von Rosen	Royal Governess (Sweden); 1799-1802	Succeeded by Charlotte Stierneld
