= Royal Society for Publication of Manuscripts on Scandinavian History =

Swedish royal academy of Scandinavian history (founded 1815)

The Royal Society for Publication of Manuscripts on Scandinavian History (Note: Swedish: Kungliga Samfundet för utgivande av handskrifter rörande Skandinaviens historia, often abbreviated SkS. Members of the society uses the post-nominal letters LSkS.) is a Swedish royal academy responsible for promoting the history of science and to preserve documents of historical interests.

== History ==
On 10 November 1815, a committee of publication was founded on the initiative of Adolf Ludvig Stierneld, Baron Stierneld, the famous nobleman and collector of historical documents. Its by-laws was passed in 1821 by Charles XIV John, King of Sweden and Norway. Some recent notable presidents include Erik Lönnroth and Herman Schück.

== Publications ==
- Handlingar rörande Skandinaviens historia (SELIBR 8207188)
- Kungl. samfundets handlingar (SELIBR 8261625)
- Historiska handlingar (SELIBR 3683566)
- Stockholms stadsböcker
