= Lethariella cladonioides =

Scientific classification
- Kingdom: Fungi
- Division: Ascomycota
- Class: Lecanoromycetes
- Order: Lecanorales
- Family: Parmeliaceae
- Genus: Lethariella
- Species: L. cladonioides

Binomial name
- Lethariella cladonioides (Nyl.) Krog (1976)

Synonyms
- Chlorea cladonioides Nyl. (1860); Evernia cladonioides (Nyl.) M.Choisy (1957); Letharia cladonioides (Nyl.) Hue (1908); Nylanderaria cladonioides (Nyl.) Kuntze (1891); Rhytidocaulon cladonioides (Nyl.) Elenkin (1916); Usnea cladonioides (Nyl.) Du Rietz (1926)

Species of lichen-forming fungus

Lethariella cladonioides, locally known as lu xin xue cha (Chinese: 鹿心雪茶; pinyin: lù xīn xuě chá, literally "deer heart snow tea") or hong xue cha (Chinese: 红雪茶; pinyin: hóng xuě chá, literally "red snow tea"), is a fruticose lichenized species of fungus in the family Parmeliaceae. It is distributed throughout Southwest and Northwest China (including eastern Tibet, western Sichuan, northwestern Yunnan, southern Shaanxi, and northwestern Gansu), India, Nepal, Pakistan, and Kashmir. In Nepal, Lethariella cladonioides has been reported at 4,724 m elevation in a compilation of published records; this reported range lies above the tree line used in the study.

The lichen is used as traditional medicine and health-promoting tea in China for treatment and prevention of sore throats, high blood pressure, inflammation, dizziness and neurasthenia.
