= Jonas Forsslund =

Swedish painter and sculptor (1754–1809)

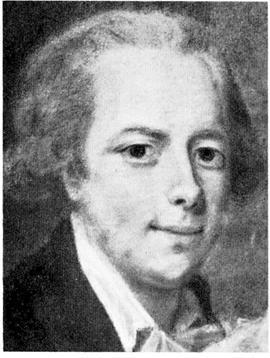
- Self-portrait (detail)
- Born: 19 November 1754; Fors Parish, Jämtland, Sweden
- Died: 9 March 1809 (aged 54); Stockholm, Sweden
- Known for: Painting, sculpture

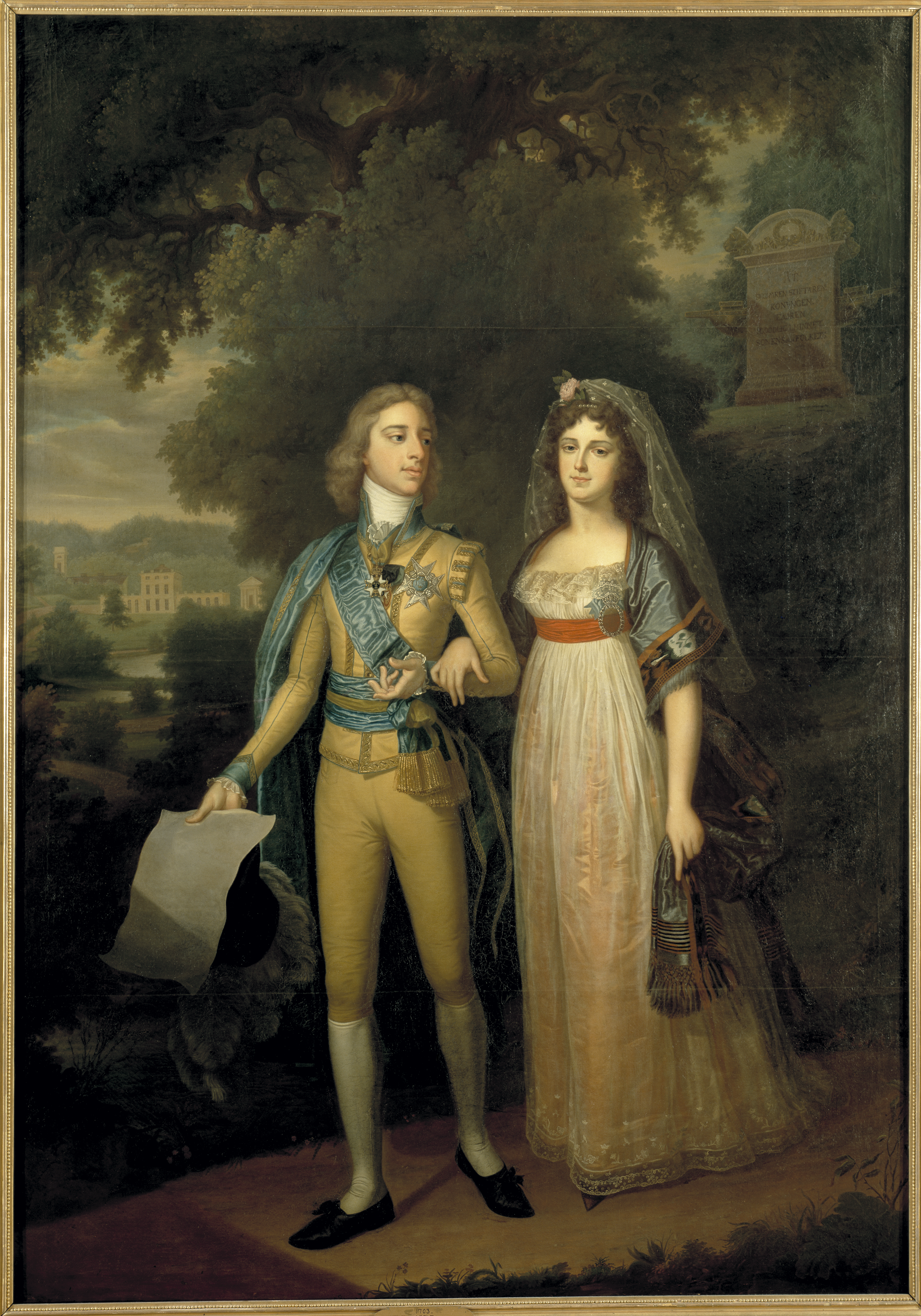
King Gustav IV Adolf and Queen Frederica

Jonas Forsslund (1754, Fors Parish, Jämtland – 9 March 1809, Stockholm) was a Swedish portrait painter and sculptor.

== Biography ==
While working as a sales assistant in Uppsala, he spent his spare time creating pastel paintings. Some of these were brought to the attention of Duke (later King) Charles XIII during a visit to Uppsala University, and Forsslund came under his patronage.

He became a student at the Royal Institute of Art, where his primary instructor was Gustaf Lundberg. In 1794, he was named a member of the Royal Swedish Academy of Fine Arts and became a Professor in 1800.

His best known works, almost all portraits, were those of King Gustav III with Sophia Magdalena of Denmark and their son, King Gustav IV Adolf with Queen Frederica of Baden, which is now at Gripsholm Castle, and one of a certain "Miss Piper", bearing flowers to her sister's grave.

Later, he turned his hand to sculpting and modeling; notably a bronze bust of Carl Linnaeus, which was originally owned by the Royal Academy of Turku and is now at the Finnish Museum of Natural History. He also created relief medallions in plaster and china.

Forsslund works are well represented at the Nationalmuseum in Stockholm.
