= Charlotte Stierneld =

Swedish courtier (1766–1825)

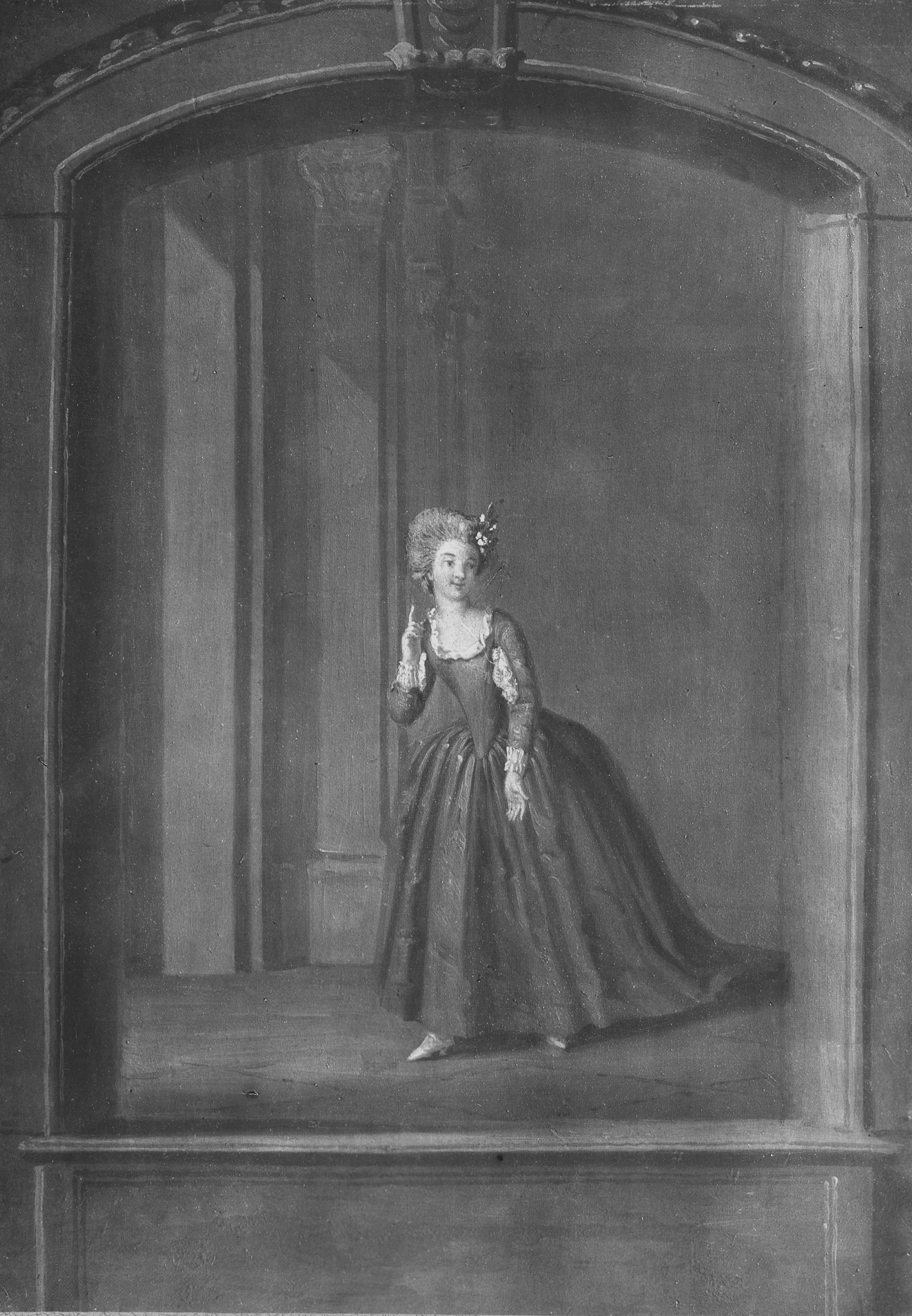
Christina Charlotta Gyldenstolpe, on stage as a member of the Amateur Theater of king Gustav III, by Pehr Hilleström, Nationalmuseum

Christina Charlotta "Charlotte" Stierneld (née Gyldenstolpe; 1766–1825) was a Swedish courtier. She was a governess for the royal children from 1802 to 1809 and överhovmästarinna (Mistress of the Robes) to the queen of Sweden, Hedvig Elisabeth Charlotte of Holstein-Gottorp, from 1811 to 1818.

== Life ==
Charlotte Stierneld was the daughter of count Nils Philip Gyldenstolpe and Jacquette Elisabet De Geer af Leufsta.

=== Court career ===
Charlotte Stierneld had a long career at the royal court. She and served as hovfröken (maid of honour) to Hedvig Elisabeth Charlotte prior to her marriage. During her tenure as maid of honour, she belonged to the favorites of duchess Charlotte and participated in the demonstration of Jeanna von Lantingshausen against the Union and Security Act of 1789. The duchess encouraged her marriage to one of the imprisoned opposition leaders, Adolf Ludvig Stierneld, who proposed to her from prison and successfully asked her to be the king for his pardon, which both she and duchess Charlotte did repeatedly with reference to his engagement. In 1790, he was released, though not because of their pleadings: they immediately married and retired from court.

She was appointed deputy royal governess to the son of Hedvig Elisabeth Charlotte, duke Charles Adolf of Värmland, in 1798; statsfru (lady of the bedchamber) to the queen, Frederica of Baden, in 1800–1802, and royal governess for the royal children in 1802 (with the title hovmästarinna from 1807). After the coup of 1809, she was named Hovmästarinna (deputy Mistress of the Robes) to queen Charlotte, and, finally, överhovmästarinna (Mistress of the Robes) to the queen in 1811–1818.

=== Private life ===
She is known to be one of five women to have been a member of the Freemasons in Sweden during the 18th century. Alongside Sophie von Fersen, Countess Ulrica Catharina Brahe and Hedda von Fersen, she was most likely inducted as a member of a Freemasonic adoption lodge for women at court in 1776, when Princess Hedvig Elisabeth Charlotte was initiated by her consort Duke Charles as Grand Mistress of the female lodge.

In 1801, she was also inducted a member of the Yellow Rose (society) of Carl Adolf Boheman, described as a Masonic adoption lodge, alongside count Erik Ruuth, Charlotte Wahrendorff, count Magnus Fredrik Brahe, Catharina Ulrica Koskull and the mother of the queen: at this point, she was described as already a member of the Freemasons, which is interpreted to mean that she was among those women inducted in the 1776 ceremony.

== Sources ==
- Cecilia af Klercker (1942). Hedvig Elisabeth Charlottas dagbok IX (1812–1817). Stockholm: Norstedt & Söners förlag.

Court offices
Preceded by Hedvig Ulrika De la Gardie	Royal Governess; 1802-1809	Succeeded by Christina Ulrika Taube
Preceded by Louise von Fersen	Överhovmästarinna to the Queen of Sweden; 1811–1818	Succeeded by Caroline Lewenhaupt
