= Du Rietz =

Du Rietz (pronunciation: [’dʏrjeː]) is a Swedish noble family of French Flanders origin. According family tradition deriving from French old nobility traditionally held to date back to 1100. The family first came to Sweden in 1642 with Grégoire François Du Rietz (1607–1682), a French court physician in the employ of Christina, Queen of Sweden. The family was naturalised in 1651 and was introduced in the Swedish nobility at the Swedish House of Nobility as family number 666 in 1660. Grégoire François Du Rietz’ great-grandson, Lieutenant general and County Governor Anders Rudolf du Rietz (1720–1792), was raised to baronial rank in 1778 and was introduced in 1779 under the name of Du Rietz af Hedensberg, family number 299. However, that branch of the family became extinct in 1797, with the death of one of his sons.

== The Du Rietz Family Association ==
Lineage association designed to maintain and expand the ties between the members of the family and to provide information about the history of the family. Membership can be obtained by anybody who carries the family name or other persons related by heritage or marriage and who has a shown interest for the aims of the Association.

== Notable members ==
- Carin du Rietz (1766–1788), first woman in the Swedish royal guard.
- Charlotte Du Rietz (1744–1820), baroness known as a love interest of King Gustav III
- Gustaf Einar Du Rietz 1895–1967, lichenologist and botanist with the standard author abbreviation 'Du Rietz'
- Erik Arthur Francois Du Rietz (b. 1977), Engineer and founder of Anumex, was sold to Schibsted a huge Norwegian business
- Kim Ekdahl du Rietz (b. 1989), handball player
- Hugo William Du Rietz (c. 1831–1908), pioneer gold miner and architect in Australia
