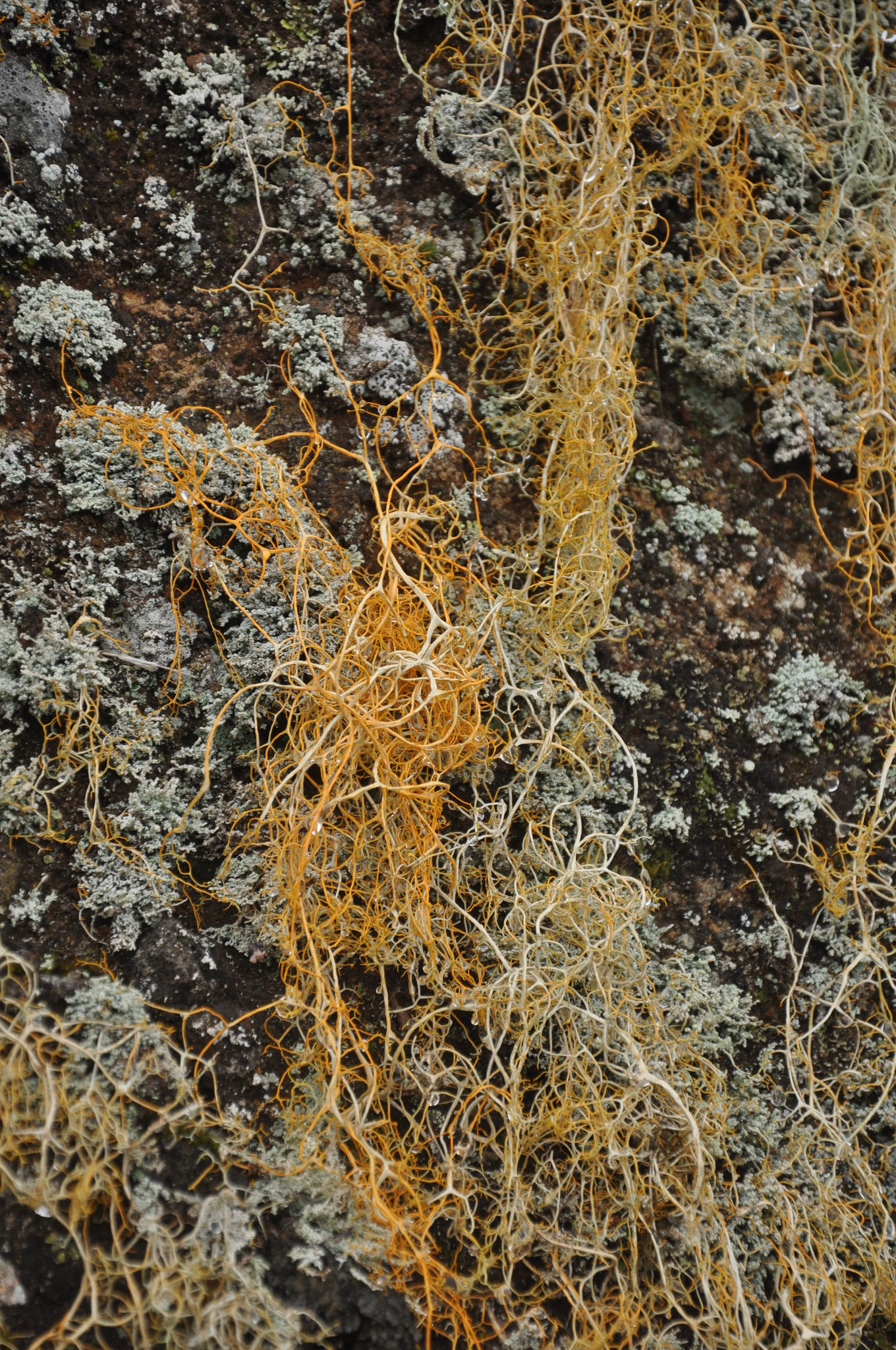
- Lethariella canariensis

Scientific classification
- Kingdom: Fungi
- Division: Ascomycota
- Class: Lecanoromycetes
- Order: Lecanorales
- Family: Parmeliaceae
- Genus: Lethariella (Motyka) Krog (1976)

Type species
- Lethariella intricata (Moris) Krog (1976)

Species
- See text

Synonyms
- Usnea subgen. Lethariella Motyka (1936)

= Lethariella =

Genus of lichen-forming fungi

Lethariella is a genus of fruticose lichens in the family Parmeliaceae. The genus was originally proposed as a subgenus of Usnea by Polish lichenologist Józef Motyka in his 1936 monograph of that genus. Norwegian botanist Hildur Krog elevated the taxon to generic status in 1976.

Three species of Lethariella are used by ethnic peoples of Yunnan Province (China) as a component of purported health-promoting tea: Lethariella cashmeriana, L. sernanderi, and L. sinensis. Species of Lethariella found in the Himalayas are also used as a component of Tibetan incense because of their fragrance, and are sold commercially in China.

== Species ==
- Lethariella canariensis (Ach.) Krog (1976)
- Lethariella cashmeriana Krog (1976)
- Lethariella cladonioides (Nyl.) Krog (1976)
- Lethariella flexuosa (Nyl.) J.C.Wei (1982)
- Lethariella intricata (Moris) Krog (1976)
- Lethariella sernanderi (Motyka) Obermayer (1995)
- Lethariella sinensis J.C.Wei & Y.M.Jiang (1982) – China
- Lethariella smithii (Du Rietz) Obermayer (1997)
- Lethariella togashii (Asahina) Krog (1976)
- Lethariella zahlbruckneri (Du Rietz) Krog (1976)

Lethariella mieheana Obermayer (1997) was later determined to be a synonym of Lethariella sinensis.
