= Charlotte Du Rietz =

Swedish baroness

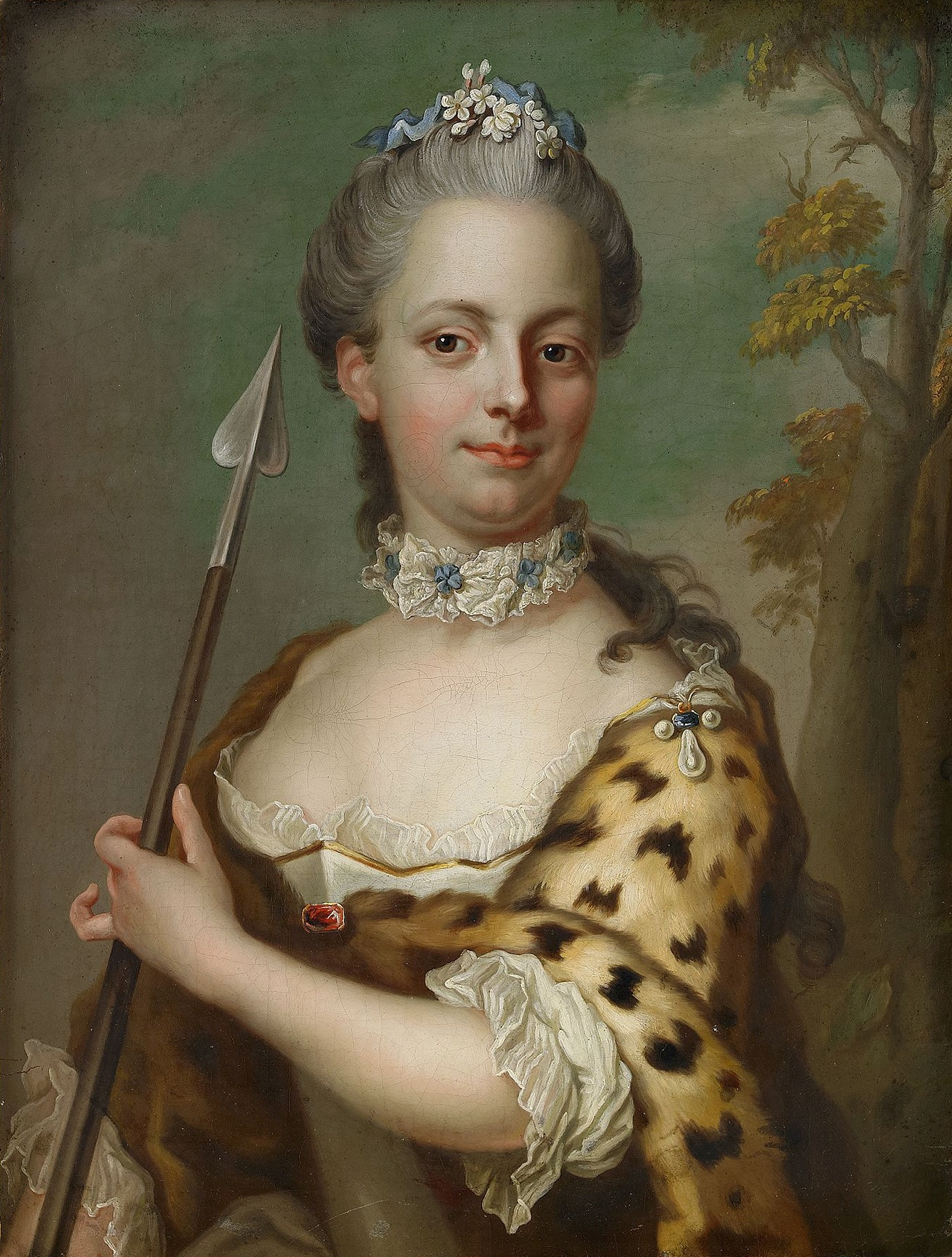
Portrait of countess Charlotte Du Rietz af Hedensberg, copy by Jakob Björck after a pastel by Gustaf Lundberg

Charlotta "Charlotte" du Riez or Du Rietz (née De Geer, 1744–1820) was a Swedish baroness, known as a love object of King Gustav III. It is unknown whether or not she was ever physically involved with the monarch.

She was the daughter of Marshal Baron Charles De Geer and Catharina Charlotta Ribbing and married Lieutenant Anders Rudolf du Rietz in 1765. She is described as a well-educated and cultivated intellectual, with an interest in chemistry. In February 1768, it was noted that Charlotte Du Rietz and Eva Helena Löwen flirted with Crown Prince Gustav and attempted to seduce him. Eventually, he reportedly succumbed to the advances of the former. From July to September 1768, Charlotte and Crown Prince Gustav were involved in a strong emotional friendship. This has been referred to as the only love affair Gustav III ever had. The relationship mostly took place by a correspondence of love letters during the summer of 1768. At the same time, Gustav was under pressure to consummate his marriage to Sophia Magdalena of Denmark at his summer residence Ekolsund Castle, and he was blamed for his flirtation by Charlotta Sparre.

In September, Gustav made an official inspection journey through Bergslagen and visited Lövstad Castle, the childhood home of Du Rietz, where he ended their flirtation after he heard rumors that she had more lovers. He wrote his farewell letter in October, when he met her in Uppsala. The real nature of the relationship has been debated, with no specific conclusions of fact available. In October, there were false rumors that Sophia Magdalena was pregnant, while in reality the marriage was still not consummated. After the relationship with Du Rietz ended, Gustav suggested a love affair to Eva Helena Löwen, but she refused with the motivation that his infatuation for her was surely but a whim of wounded self pride, and although she could love him, she could not come between him and her own future Queen.

The statement about the consummation of the marriage of Gustav III, made by Adolf Fredrik Munck, describes the sexual history of Gustav III and thereby also the character of his relationship with Charlotte Du Rietz. In his statement, Munck reports that Gustav had only one partner before Charlotte Du Rietz, "the wife of an English sea captain," in Gothenburg in 1766, but neither in that case nor in the relationship with Charlotte Du Rietz was there apparently any other physical contact than touching "without effect". This was the reason that the most famous courtesan of Stockholm, Catharina Norman, was hired in 1771 to remove the king's virginity. After her meeting with the monarch, Catharina Norman reported that: "His Majesty is terribly shy and utterly unused to it", and that it had not been possible to perform intercourse. The relationship between Charlotte Du Rietz and Gustav III was therefore likely not sexually consummated.

The correspondence between Du Rietz and Gustav III is kept at Uppsala University Library.

== See also ==
- Hedvig Catharina De la Gardie
