= Lethariella cashmeriana =

Scientific classification
- Domain: Eukaryota
- Kingdom: Fungi
- Division: Ascomycota
- Class: Lecanoromycetes
- Order: Lecanorales
- Family: Parmeliaceae
- Genus: Lethariella
- Species: L. cashmeriana

Binomial name
- Lethariella cashmeriana Krog (1976)

Species of lichen

Lethariella cashmeriana is a species of fruticose lichen in the family Parmeliaceae. It was formally described as a new species in 1976 by Hildur Krog. The species epithet cashmeriana refers to Jammu-Kashmir, where the type specimen was collected. The lichen is one of three species of Lethariella that is used as a purported health-promoting tea in Yunnan, China. It contains atranorin, canarione, gyrophoric acid, and norstictic acid (minor) as lichen products.
