= Grégoire François Du Rietz =

French physician

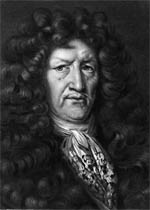
Grégoire François Du Rietz

Grégoire François Du Rietz (1607, Arras - 5 February 1682, Maria Magdalena church, Stockholm) was a physician. He was born in Arras which was then part of the Spanish Netherlands. He served as personal physician to queen Christina of Sweden, Carl X Gustav of Sweden, Hedvig Eleonora of Holstein-Gottorp and Carl XI of Sweden. He was naturalised as a Swedish subject in 1660 and was thus the originator of the Swedish Du Rietz dynasty.
