= King's Cabinet for Foreign Correspondence =

Former Ministry of the Swedish Government

The King's Cabinet for Foreign Correspondence (Swedish: Konungens kabinett för den utrikes brevväxlingen) is the predecessor of the Ministry for Foreign Affairs of Sweden (Utrikesdepartementet), the modern-day government agency responsible for policies related to foreign policy. It was created in April 1791 by Gustav III, King of Sweden after major reorganizations of the central state administration. Previously, foreign relations was managed by the Royal Chancellery (Kunglig Majestäts kansli), and since 1713, by the Foreign Office (Utrikesexpeditionen). The latter existed until 1809, when the cabinet replaced it. The State Secretary (kabinettssekreterare) is the highest position below the head of the cabinet (departementschef). By the Administration Reform of 1840 (departementsreformen 1840), the cabinet changed to its current form and name.
