= Nils Philip Gyldenstolpe =

Swedish politician (1734–1810)

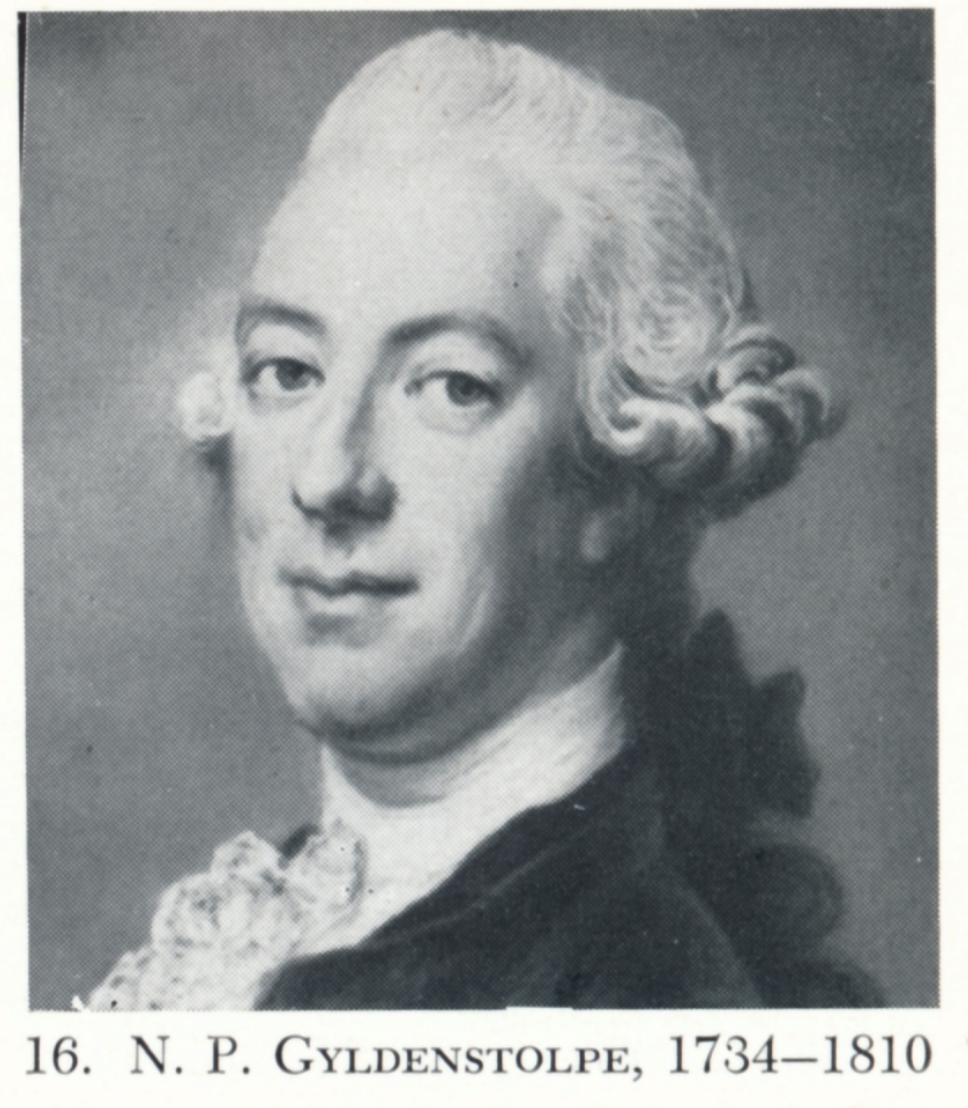
Nils Philip Gyldenstolpe

Nils Philip Gyldenstolpe (19 February 1734 – 20 February 1810) was a Swedish politician who served as a court marshal at the Royal Court of Sweden. From 1773 to 1781, he was the governor of Gävleborg County. From 1789 until his death, he occupied Seat No. 1 at the Swedish Academy.

Cultural offices
Preceded by Anders Johan von Höpken	Swedish Academy, Seat No 1; 1789–1810	Succeeded by Johan Olof Wallin
