= Gustaf Lundberg =

Swedish rococo pastelist and portrait painter (1695–1786)

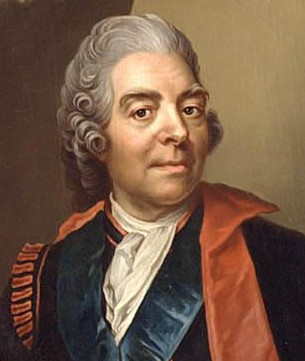
- Copy by Jakob Björck of Lundberg's self-portrait, c. 1780
- Born: 17 August 1695
- Died: 18 March 1786 (aged 90)
- Resting place: Uppsala Old Cemetery
- Education: David von Krafft * Hyacinthe Rigaud * Nicolas de Largillière * Jean-François de Troy * Rosalba Carriera
- Movement: Rococo

Gustaf Lundberg (17 August 1695 – 18 March 1786) was a Swedish rococo pastelist and portrait painter. He trained and worked in Paris and later was appointed court portrait painter in Stockholm.

== Biography ==
Lundberg was born in Stockholm, Sweden, son of royal chef Gustaf Lundberg and his wife Sabina Richter, whose family included successful artists. Orphaned at an early age, he was raised by his grandfather, Fredrik Richter, who was a goldsmith. Lundberg was later apprenticed to German-Swedish painter David von Krafft (1655–1724) in 1712.

In 1717, Lundberg traveled to Paris, where he studied with Hyacinthe Rigaud (1659–1743), Nicolas de Largillière (1656–1746) and Jean-François de Troy (1679–1752). The determining influence was the Venetian painter Rosalba Carriera (1675–1757), who lived in Paris from 1720 to 1721.

Afterwards, Lundberg established himself as one of the leading portrait painters in Paris. He painted Louis XV and his Queen Marie Leszczyńska, and the Queen's parents, deposed King Stanisław Leszczyński and his spouse, and gave Stanislaus pastel painting lessons. He portrayed many of the Swedes visiting Paris and befriended Count Carl Gustaf Tessin (1695–1770)— Swedish ambassador, art collector, and member of the famous family of architects, who let him stay in his palace. In addition to his many portraits of French and Swedish aristocracy, he is known for his paintings of colleagues, French Rococo artists Charles-Joseph Natoire (1700–1777) and François Boucher (1703–1770).

In 1741, Lundberg was elected a member of the Royal Academy of Painting and Sculpture (Académie royale de peinture et de sculpture). But his popularity started to wane soon after, as a result of new pastelists representing a more realistic style than his. During 1745, he traveled through Spain and Portugal, stopping in Madrid to paint Louis XV's daughter, Louise-Élisabeth, who was married to Philip, the son of King Philip V.

He returned to Sweden in the autumn of 1745. An already successful artist, he quickly established himself as the leading rococo painter in Sweden. Thanks to his friendship with Carl Gustaf Tessin, he was soon introduced at the Royal Court of Sweden. Lundberg's light and elegant style was a break from the Baroque style of portraiture that had previously predominated. In 1750, he was appointed court portrait painter (hovkonterfejare). He painted many portraits of the Crown Prince, later King Gustav III. Towards the end of his career, he painted a portrait of the young Crown Prince Gustav Adolf in 1779. He died in Stockholm in 1786 and was buried at Uppsala gamla kyrkogård.

== Gallery ==
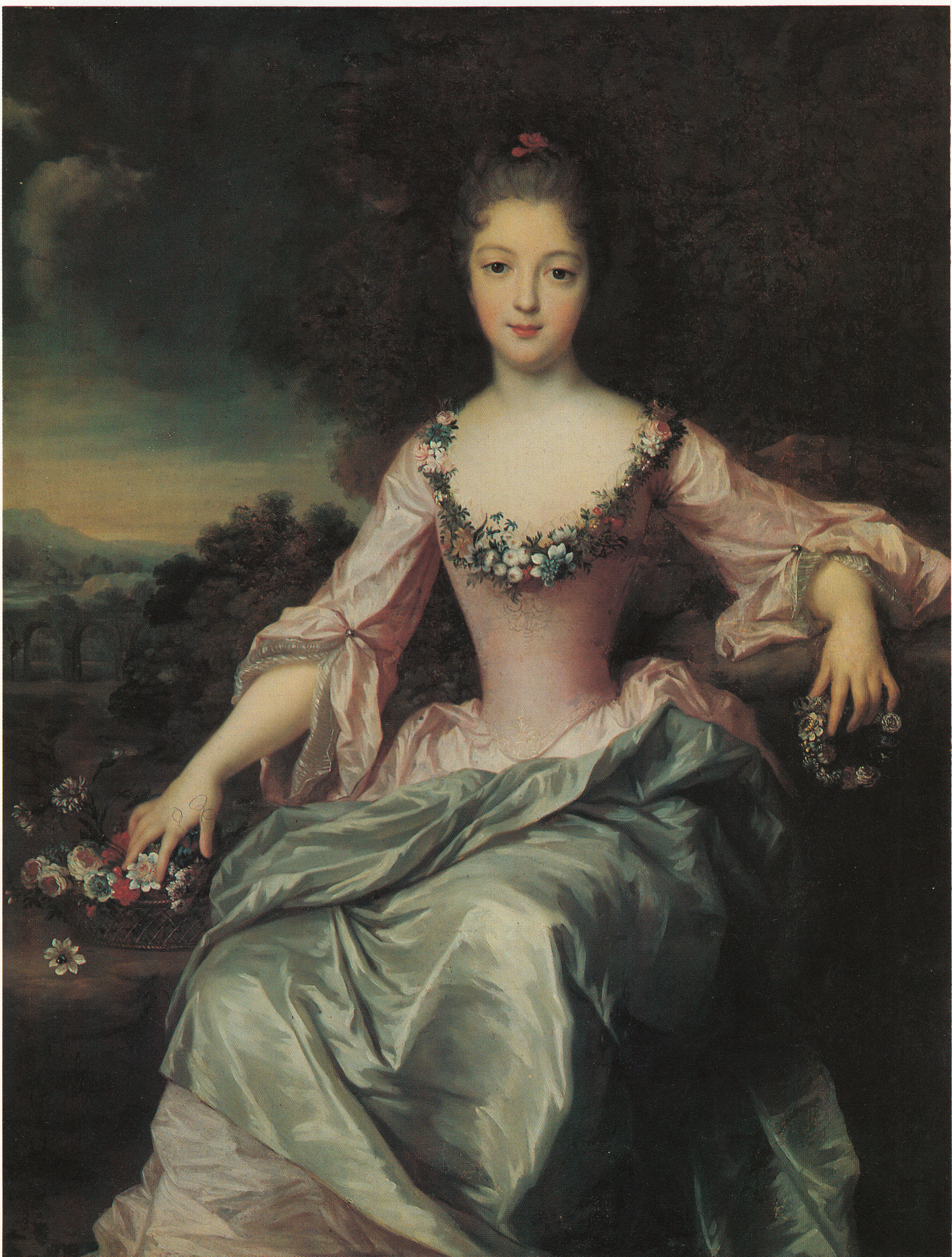
Marie-Anne de Bourbon-Condé, oil on canvas after Jean-Baptiste Santerre, 1720.

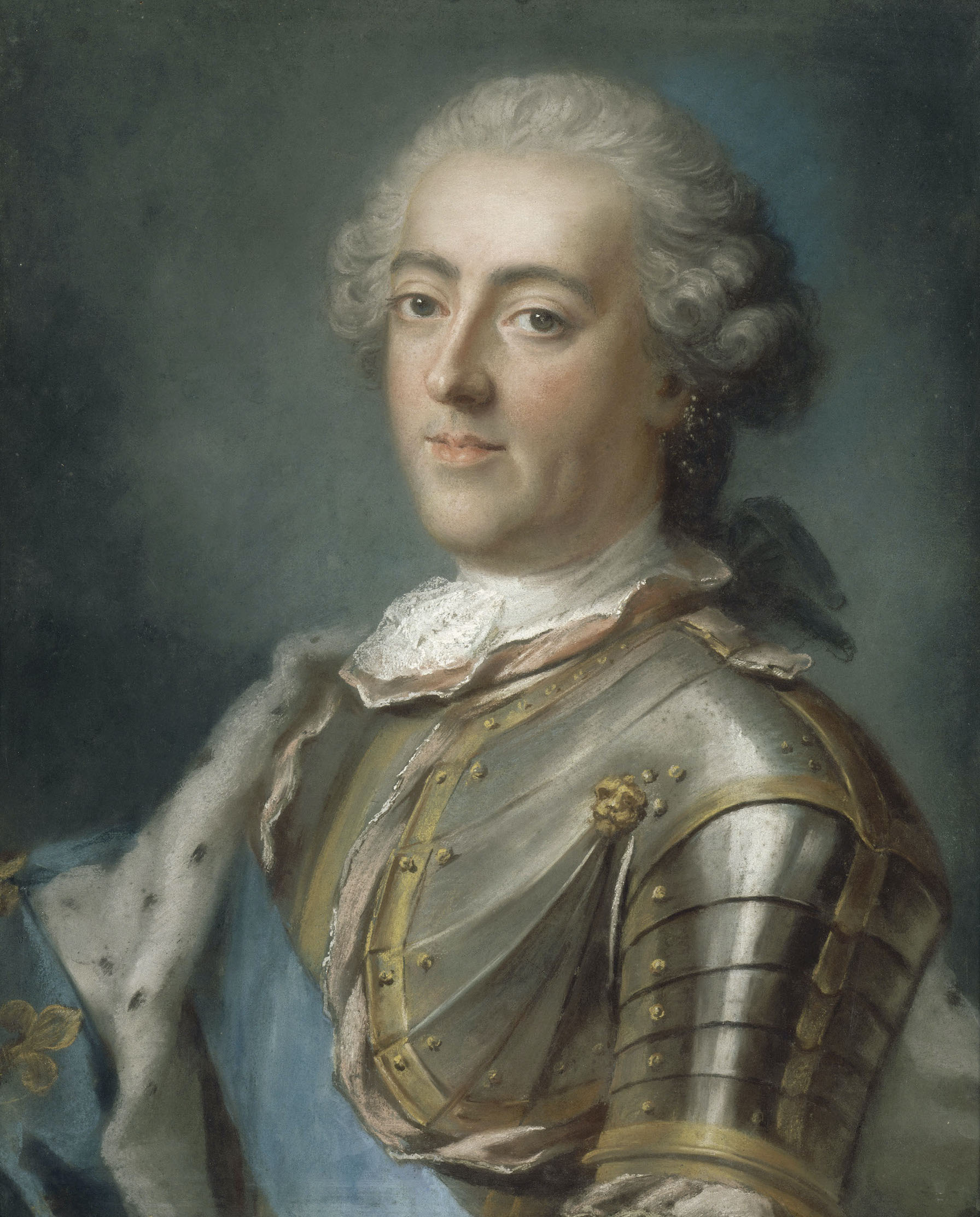
Louis XV of France, pastel copy, 1730s.

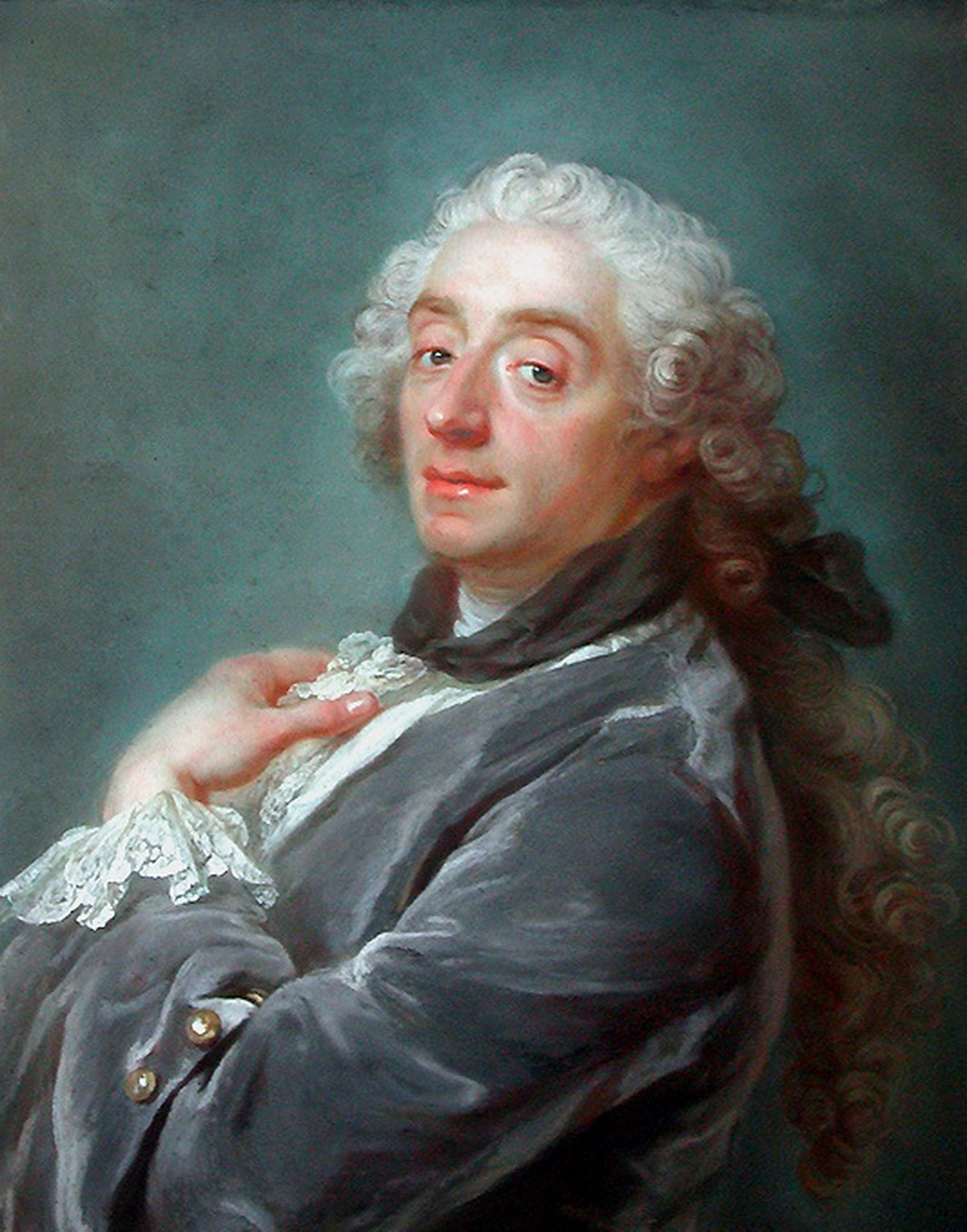
Portrait of the artist François Boucher, for the French academy, pastel 1741.

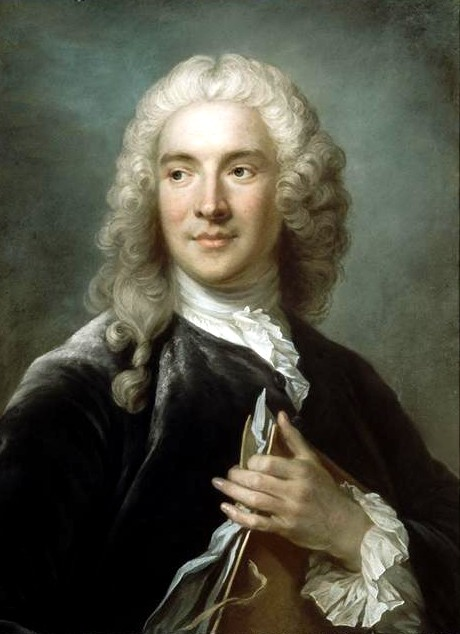
Portrait of the artist Charles-Joseph Natoire, for the French academy, pastel 1741.

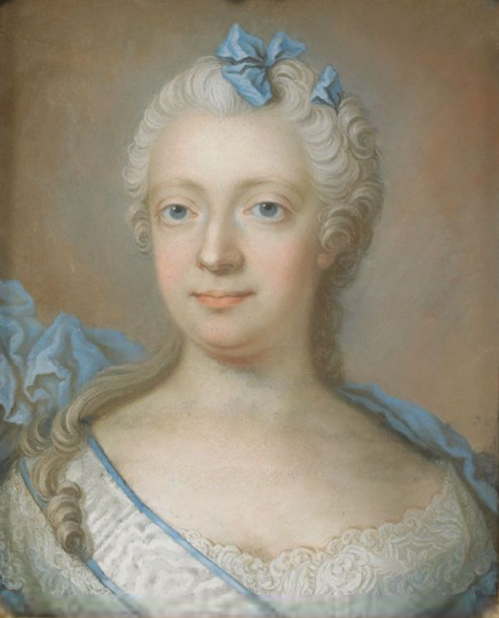
Louisa Ulrika of Prussia as crown princess of Sweden, pastel, 1745–46.

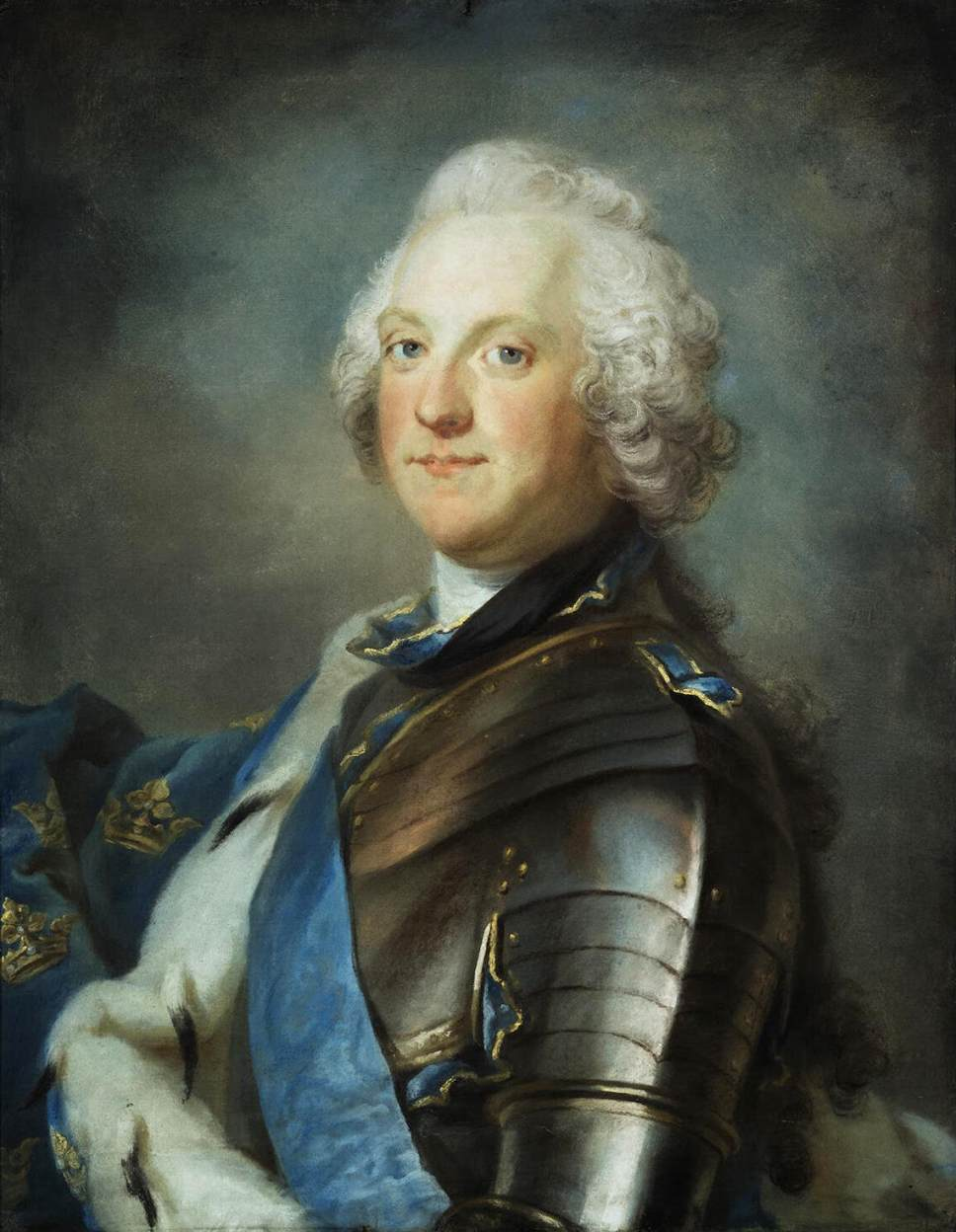
Portrait of Adolf Frederick of Sweden, pastel 1750.

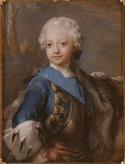
King Gustav III of Sweden as child, pastel 1750.

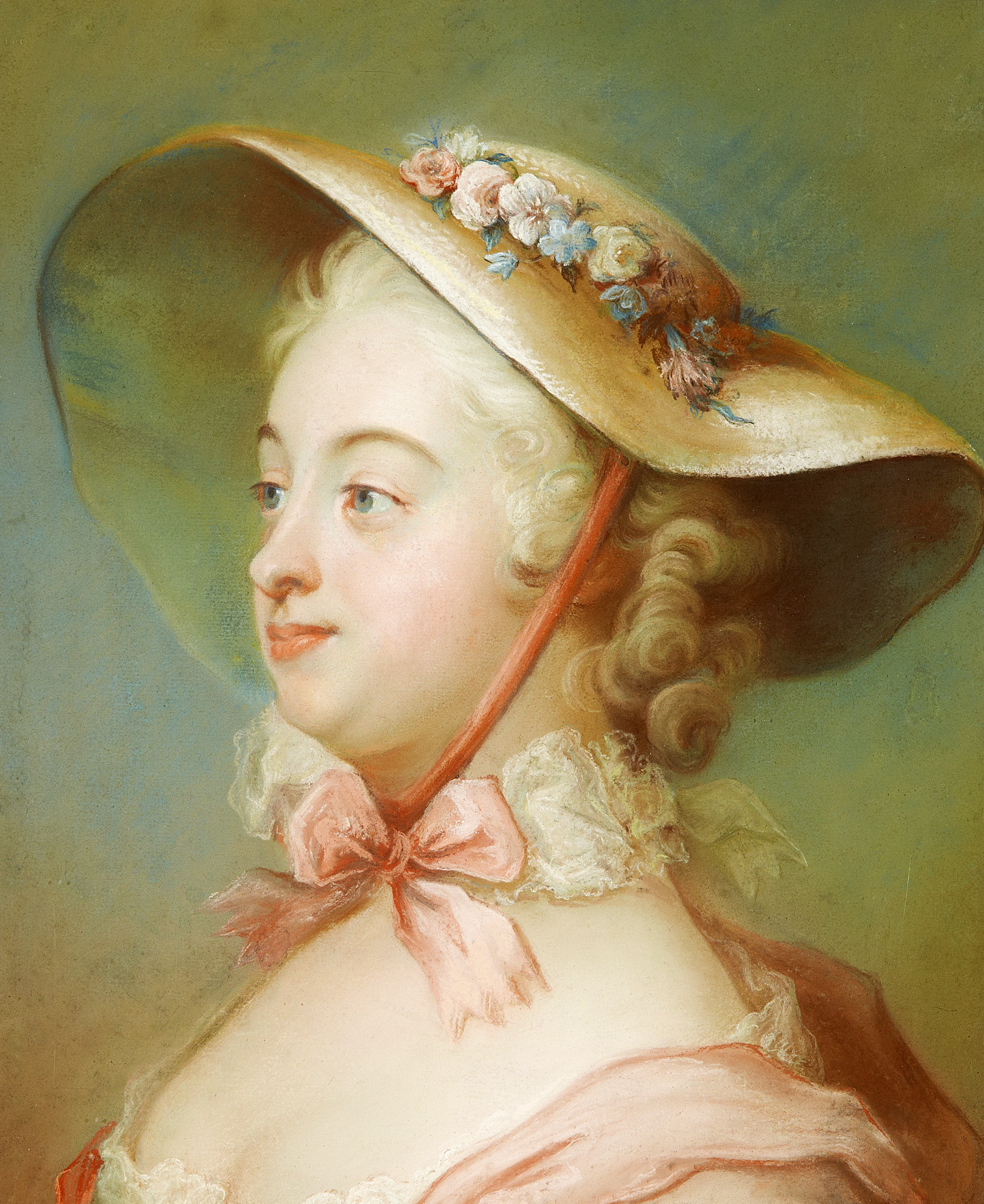
Portrait of Juliana Dorotea Henck, pastel, 1750s.

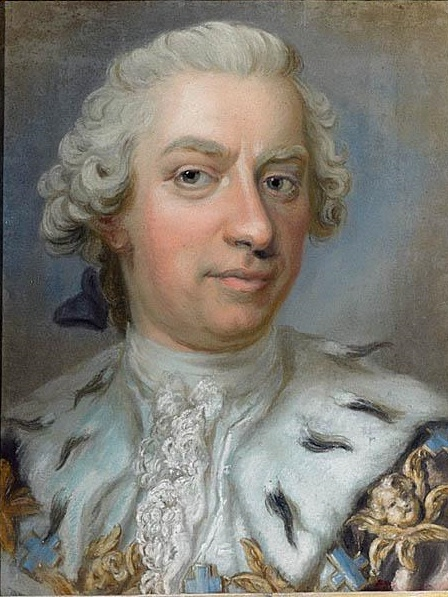
Portrait of count Henning Adolf Gyllenborg, pastel, 1750s.

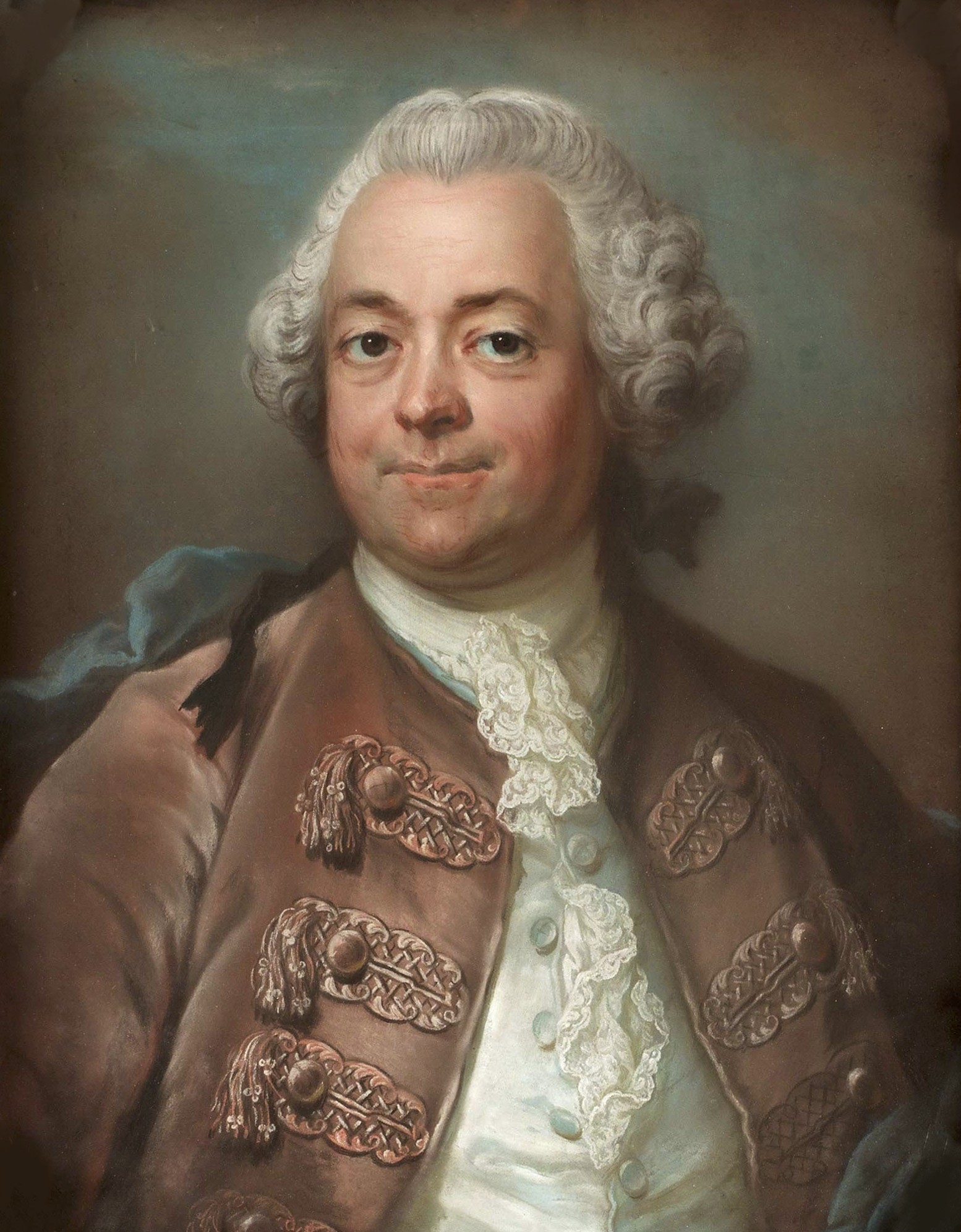
Portrait of Herman Petersen, pastel 1760.

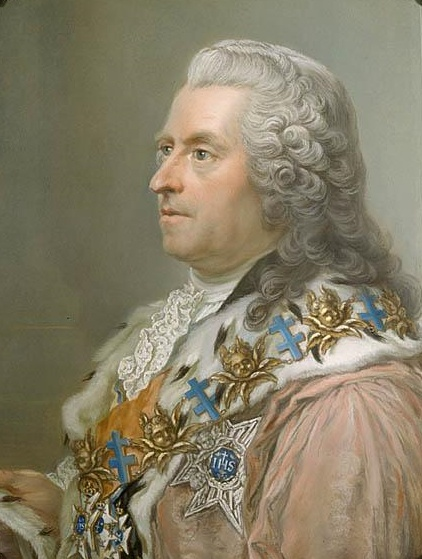
Portrait of Count Carl Gustaf Tessin, pastel, 1760.

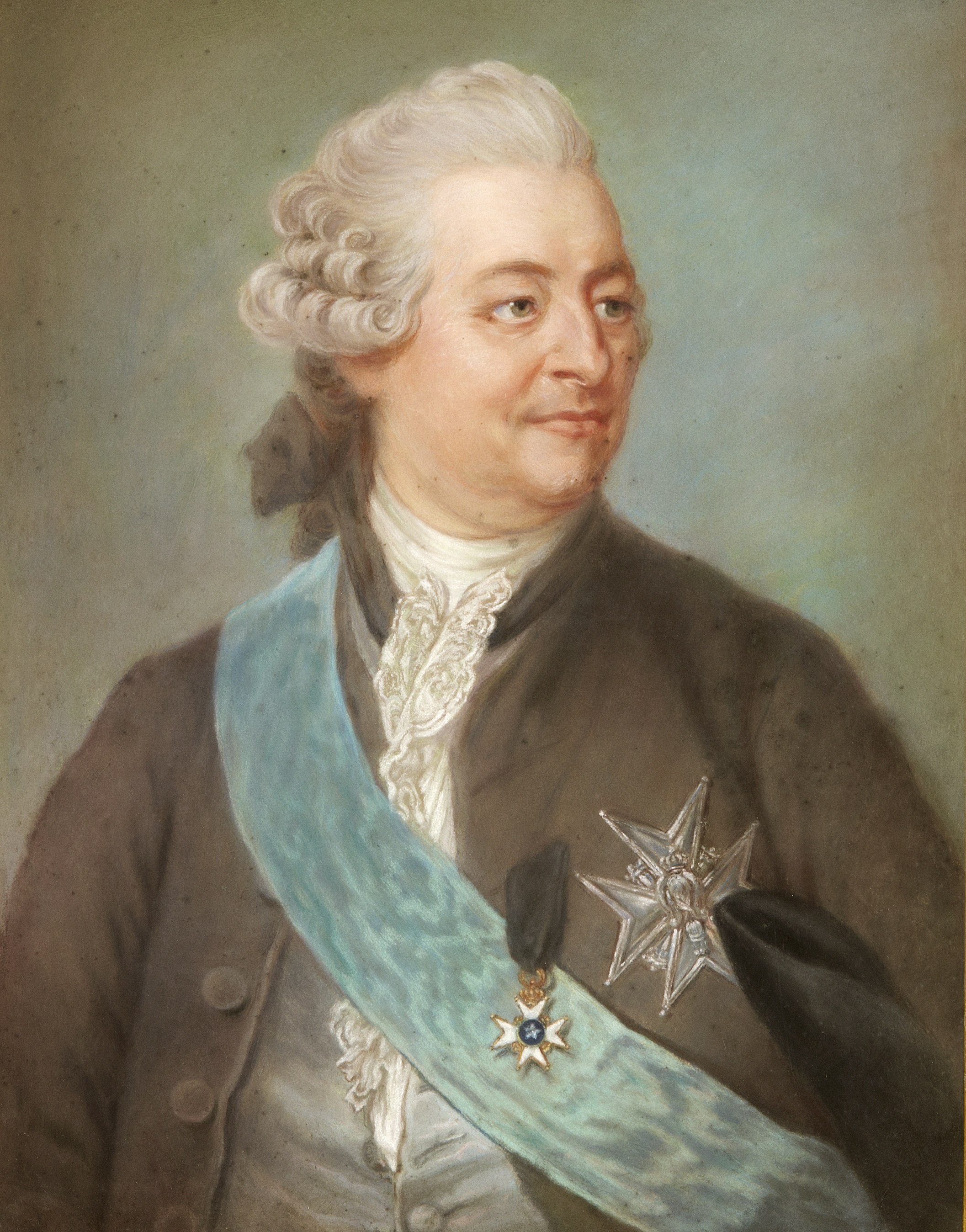
Portrait of Baron Charles De Geer, pastel.

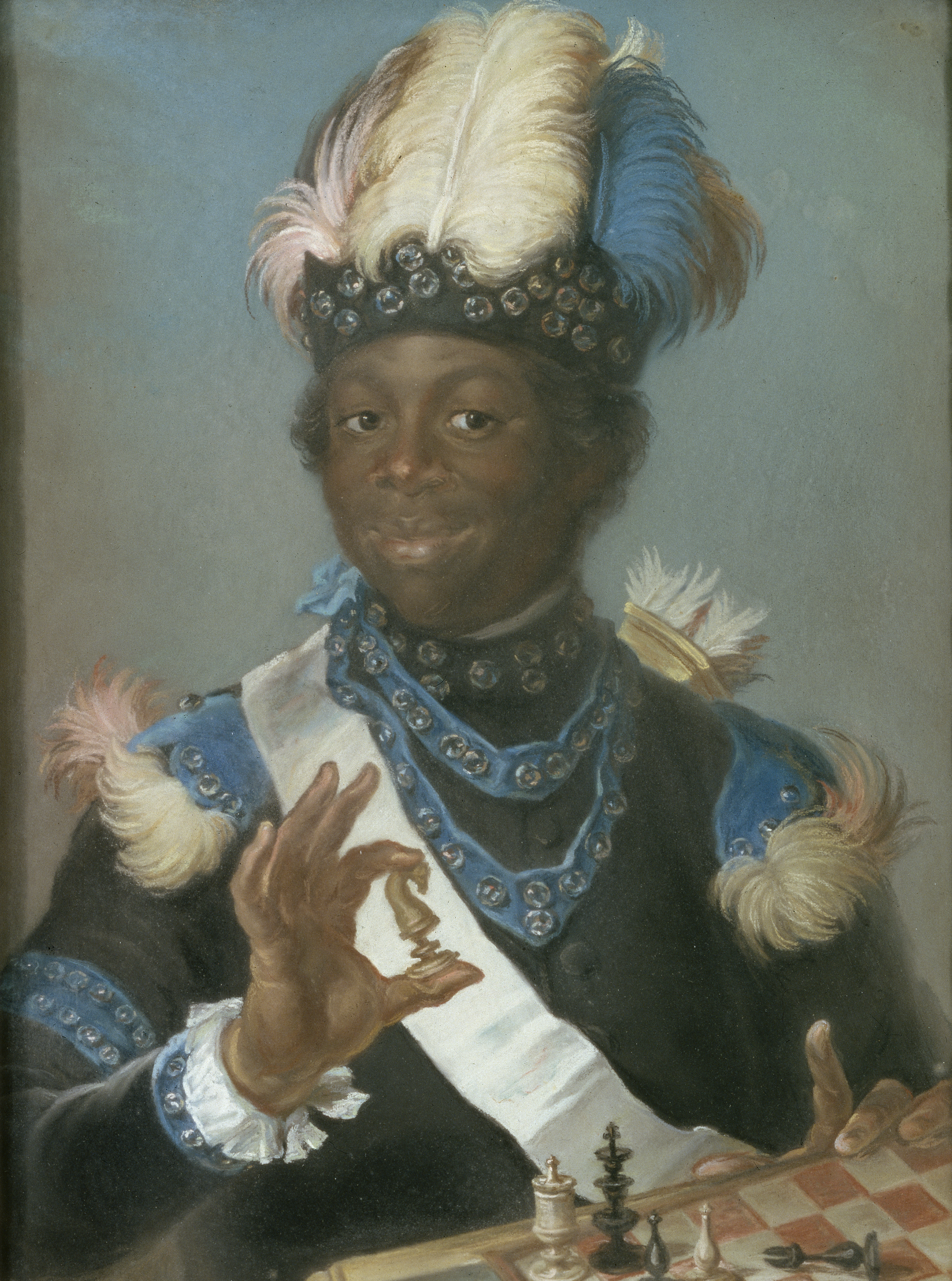
Gustav Badin, pastel 1775.

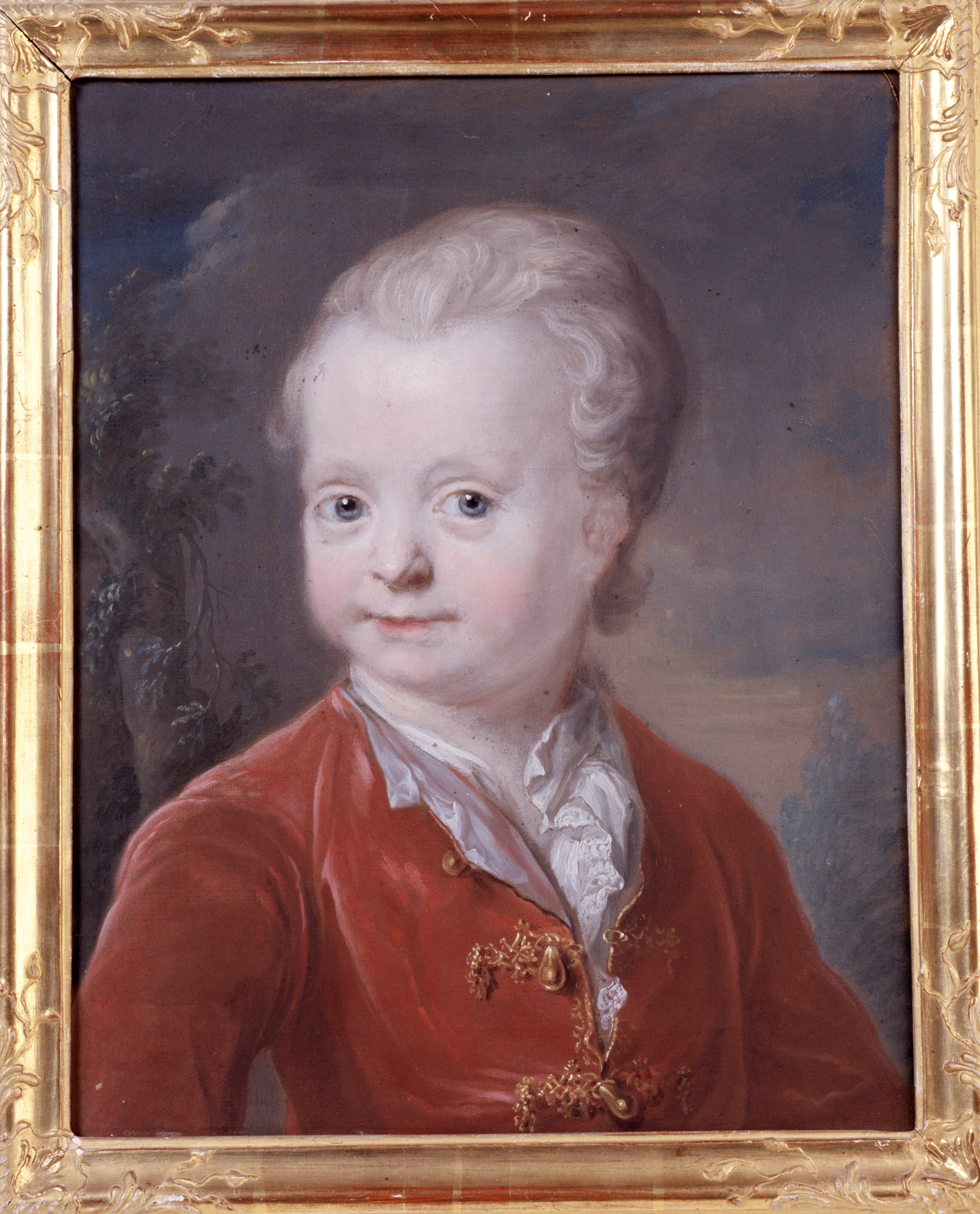
Child, Nils Brahe, 1750s.

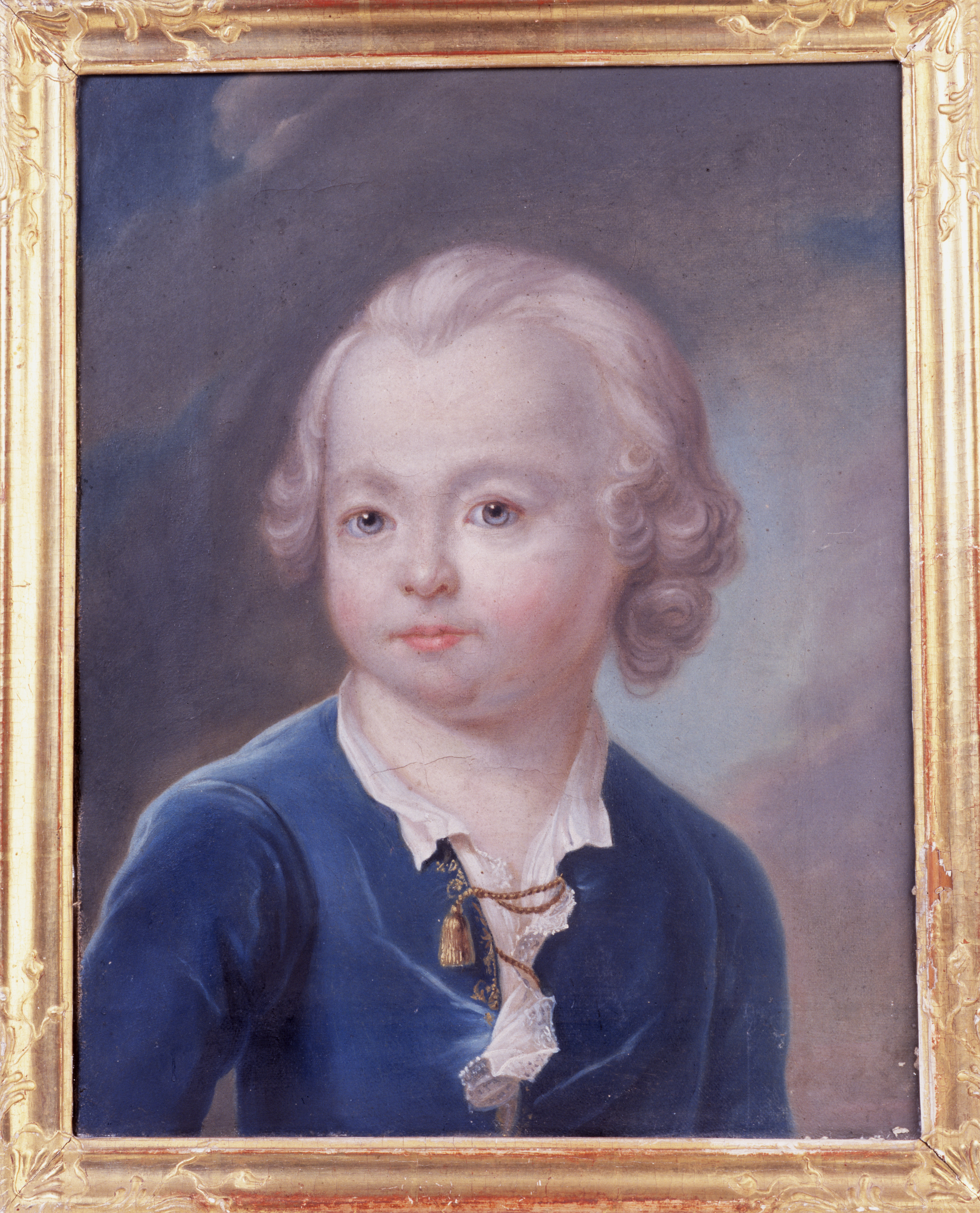
Child, Per Brahe, 1747–1749.

== Other sources ==
- Merit Laine, Carolina Brown (2006) Gustaf Lundberg 1695–1786 (Nationalmusei skriftserie) ISBN 917100727X
