= Fersen family =

Fersen
- Noble family
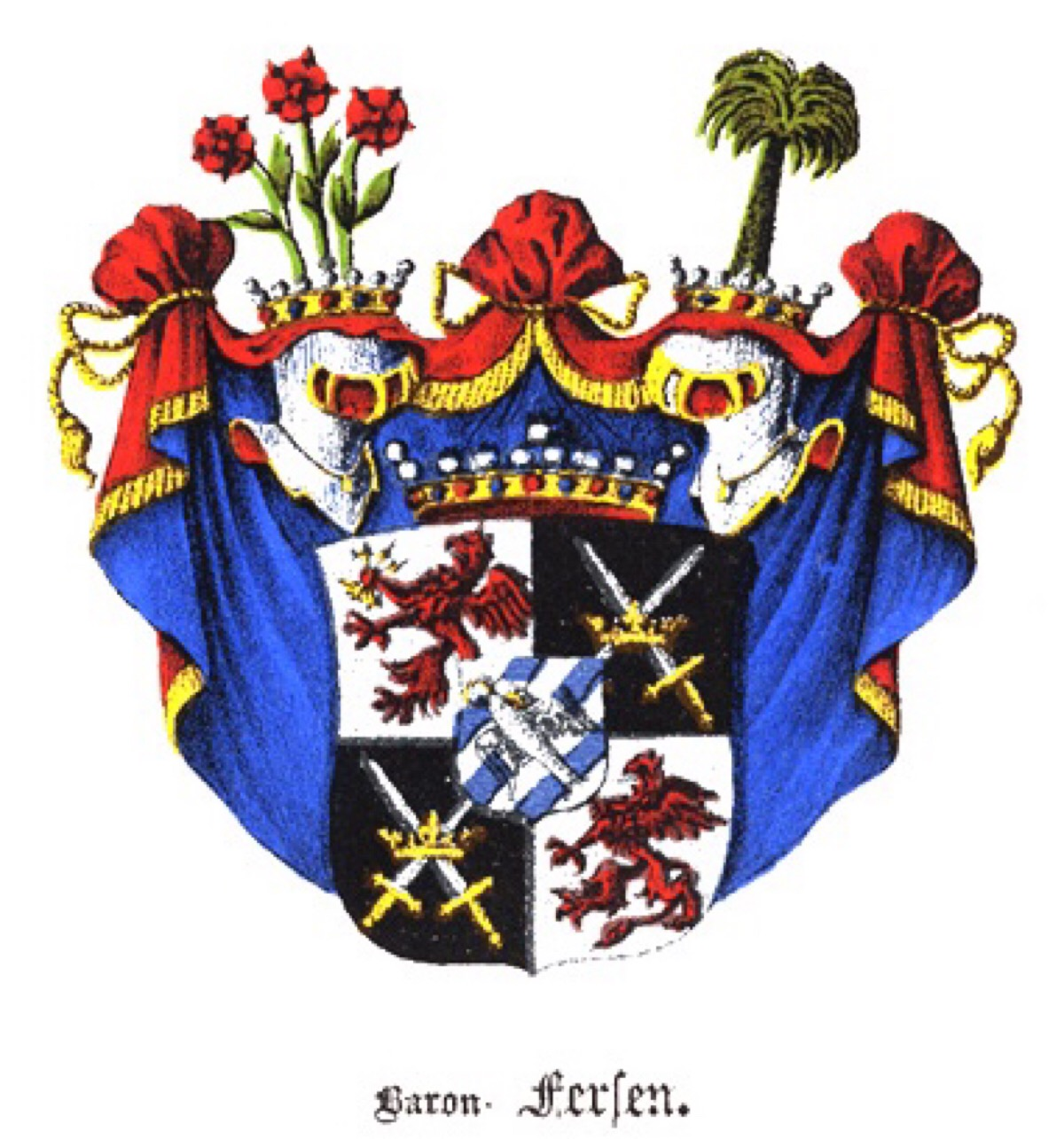
- Coat of arms granted to the Barons Fersen
- Country: Germany, Prussia, Russian Empire and Sweden
- Current region: Northern Europe (mainly Estonia, Latvia, Germany and Sweden)
- Earlier spellings: Versen
- Origin: Niedersachsen
- Titles: List: Baron Fersen (1674); Count Fersen (1712)

The Fersen family, stylized as the von Fersen (German: Versen), is a Baltic-German noble family grouped into several ennobled branches that settled in and around the kingdoms bordering the Baltic Sea in Northern Europe. The most well-known holders of the surname settled in modern day Sweden and Livonia (modern day Latvia and Estonia) which was once part of the Swedish Empire, and later of the Russian Empire.

== Overview ==
The family was first mentioned in the historical region of Pomerania in the 13th century.

The earliest records of the Fersen family in Livonia area in the late 17th century suggest possible links to earlier participation in the Northern Wars.

== Estonian branch ==
The Estonian branch of the Fersen family possessed several manor houses.

== Swedish branch ==
The Swedish branch of the Fersen family originally derived from the line in Livonia. After moving to Sweden, some of its members were awarded Countships for gallant military acts. This line is best known through its line of distinguished military service and for Axel von Fersen the Younger's possible love affair with Marie Antionette, suggested in court accounts and a recently uncovered series of "torrid" love letters and who might have "even fathered as many as two of her children."

== Lineage ==
=== Swedish branch ===
- Fabian von Fersen (född 1568)
  - Herman von Fersen (lantråd)
    - Otto Wilhelm von Fersen (1623–1703)
  - Reinhold von Fersen (1594–1649)
    - Hans von Fersen den äldre (1625–1683)
      - Reinhold Johan von Fersen (1646–1716)
        - Hans Reinhold von Fersen (1683–1736)
          - Carl von Fersen (1716–1786)
            - Ulla von Fersen (1749–1810)
            - Augusta von Fersen (1754–1846)
          - Axel von Fersen the Elder (1719–1794)
            - Hedda von Fersen (1753–1792)
            - Axel von Fersen the Younger (1755–1810)
            - Sophie von Fersen (1757–1816)
            - Fabian von Fersen (1762–1818)
              - Axel von Fersen (1798–1838)
              - Hans von Fersen (1802–1839)
              - Louise von Fersen (1816–1879)
    - Fabian von Fersen (1626–1677)

== List of people ==
- Fabian von Fersen (1626–1677), Swedish general
- Otto Wilhelm von Fersen (1623–1703), Swedish general, Fabian's cousin
- Hans Reinhold Fersen (1683–1726), Swedish general
- Axel von Fersen Sr. (1719–1794), Swedish politician, son of the above
- Ulrika von Fersen (1746–1810), Swedish courtier, niece of the above
- Hedvig Eleonora von Fersen (1753–1792), socialite, cousin of the above
- Augusta von Fersen (1754–1846), Swedish courtier, cousin of the above
- Axel von Fersen Jr. (1755–1810), Swedish politician, cousin of the above
- Sophie von Fersen (1757–1816), Swedish courtier, sister of the above
- Fabian von Fersen (1762–1818), Swedish politician, cousin of the above
- Johann Hermann von Fersen (Unknown–1801), Saxon-born infantry general who served in the Imperial Russian Army
- Hans William von Fersen (1858–1937), Baltic German admiral in the Imperial Russian Navy
