= Ernst Tandefelt =

Swedish-speaking Finnish nobleman

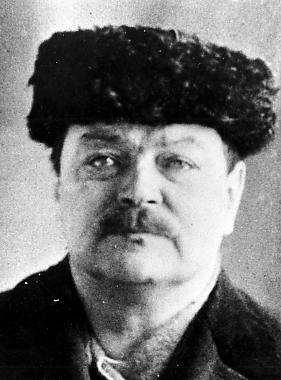
Ernst Tandefelt

Knut Ernst Robert Tandefelt (10 March 1876 in Sysmä, Finland – 3 May 1948 in Sipoo, Finland) was a Swedish-speaking Finnish nobleman.

The mentally unstable Tandefelt shot the Finnish Minister of Internal Affairs Heikki Ritavuori dead at Ritavuori's home door at Nervanderinkatu 11 in Etu-Töölö, Helsinki on 14 February 1922, to affect Finland's politics in the Kindred Nations Wars (heimosodat) taking place in Eastern Karelia. The event was the only murder of a government minister and the only political assassination in the entire history of independent Finland.

Tandefelt has often been suspected of having acted because of an extreme right-wing conspiracy, but there is no binding evidence of this. Tandefelt himself said he acted alone.

Tandefelt was sentenced to life imprisonment of hard labor. Later, the Supreme Court of Finland ordered him to undergo a mental health examination. Tandefelt was legally found to be partially insane and the sentence was lowered to 12 years of hard labor. Tandefelt died in the Nikkilä's mental hospital on 3 May 1948.

Tandefelt's grandfather was the second cousin of Otto Johan Tandefelt, one of the convicted participants in the lynch mob that killed Axel von Fersen in 1810.
