= Axel von Fersen the Elder =

18th-century Swedish lantmarskalk or marshal of the diet

- Count
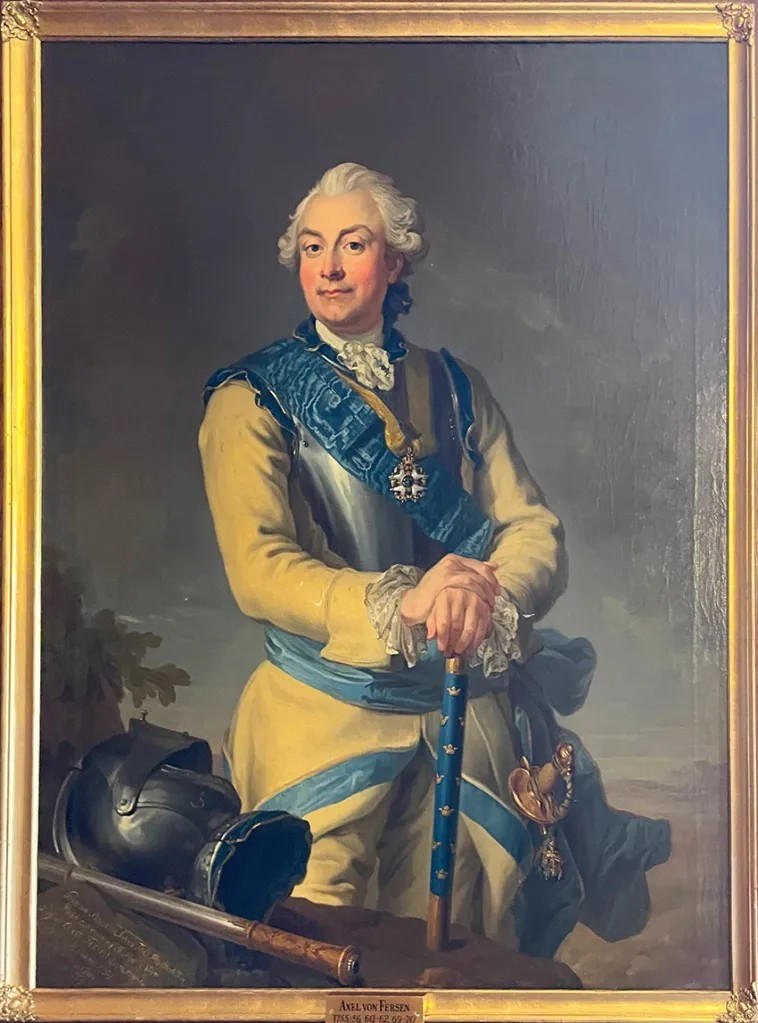

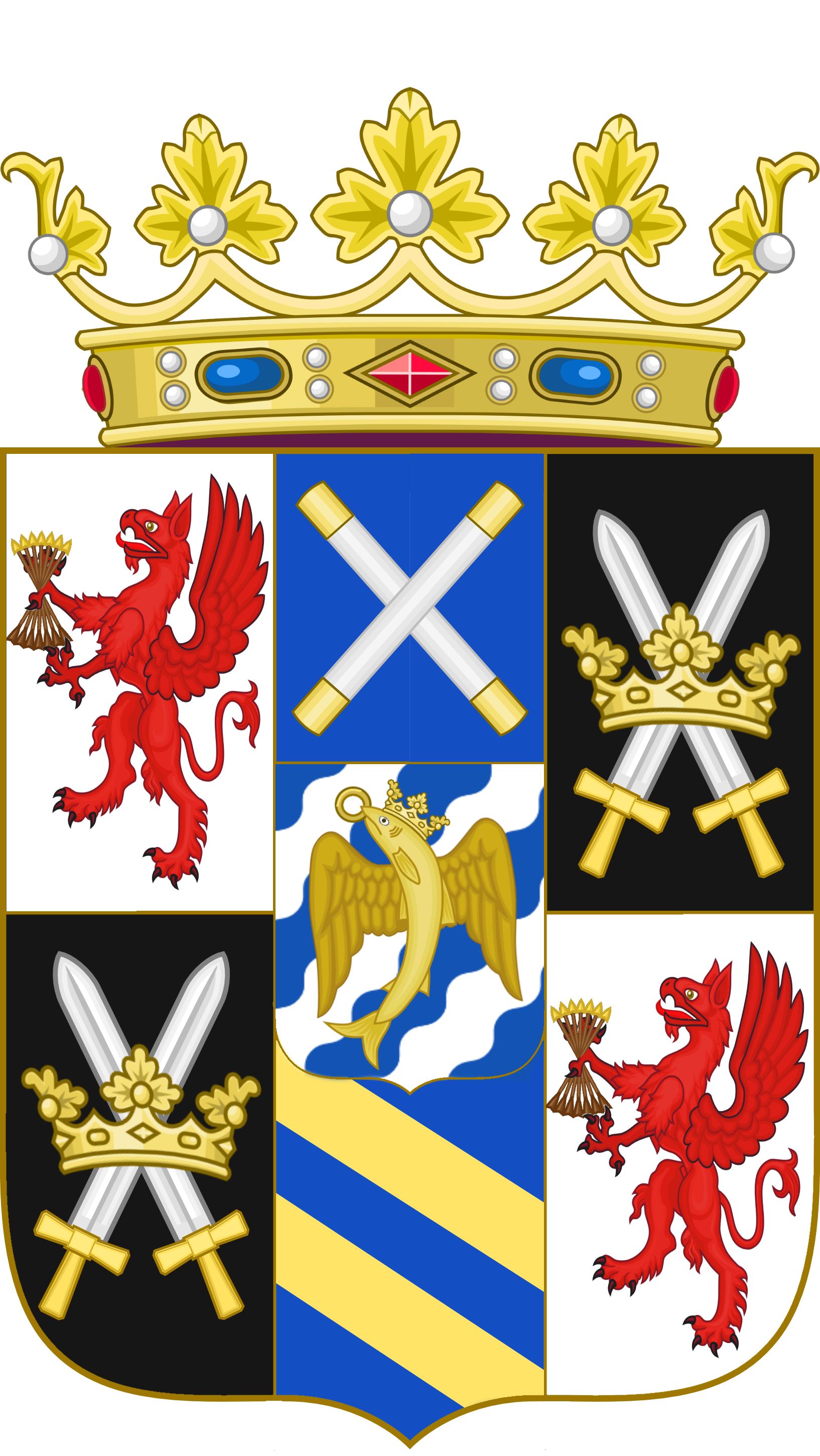
- Coat of arms
- Full name: Fredrik Axel von Fersen
- Born: 5 April 1719; Stockholm
- Died: 24 April 1794 (aged 75); Stockholm
- Noble family: Fersen family
- Spouse: Hedvig Catharina De la Gardie
- Father: Hans von Fersen
- Occupation: soldier, politician
- Royal Swedish Army
- Allegiance: Sweden
- Branch: Cavalry, Infantry
- Service years: 1737-1794
- Rank: Field Marshal 1770
- Units: Life Regiment of Horse 1737; His Majesty's Drabants 1743; Svea Life Guards 1756
- Awards: Knight of the Order of the Seraphim 1758; Commander Grand Cross of the Order of the Sword 1758; Knight of the Order of the Sword 1748
- Royal French Army
- Allegiance: King of France
- Branch: Infantry
- Service years: 1740-1753
- Rank: Brigadier 1748
- Units: Régiment d’Alsace 1740; Régiment de Fersen 1745

Councelor of the Realm
- In office 1772–1773

Lord Marshal
- In office 1755–1756
- In office 1760–1762
- In office 1769–1770

Member of the Riksdag of the Estates
- In office 1742–1743
- In office 1751–1789

Count Fredrik Axel von Fersen (5 April 1719 – 24 April 1794) was a Swedish statesman and soldier of Baltic German descent. He served as Lord Marshal of the Riksdag of the Estates, and although he worked closely with King Gustav III before and through the Revolution of 1772, he later opposed the king.

== Biography ==
A son of Lieutenant-General Hans Reinhold von Fersen and his wife Countess Eleonora Margareta Wachtmeister (1684–1748), he entered the Swedish Life Guards in 1740, and from 1743 to 1748 was in the French service as colonel of the Régiment de Fersen and brigadier des armées du roi. His brother was Count Carl von Fersen (1716-1786).

In the Seven Years' War Fersen distinguished himself during the operations round Usedom and Wollin in 1759, when he inflicted serious loss on the Prussians. But it is as a politician that he is best known. A member of the Hat party, at the Riksdag of 1755–1756, he was elected Lord Marshal and served three non-consecutive terms in that post before the Revolution of 1772. In 1756 he defeated the projects of the court for increasing the royal power; but, after the disasters of the Seven Years' War, returned to court.

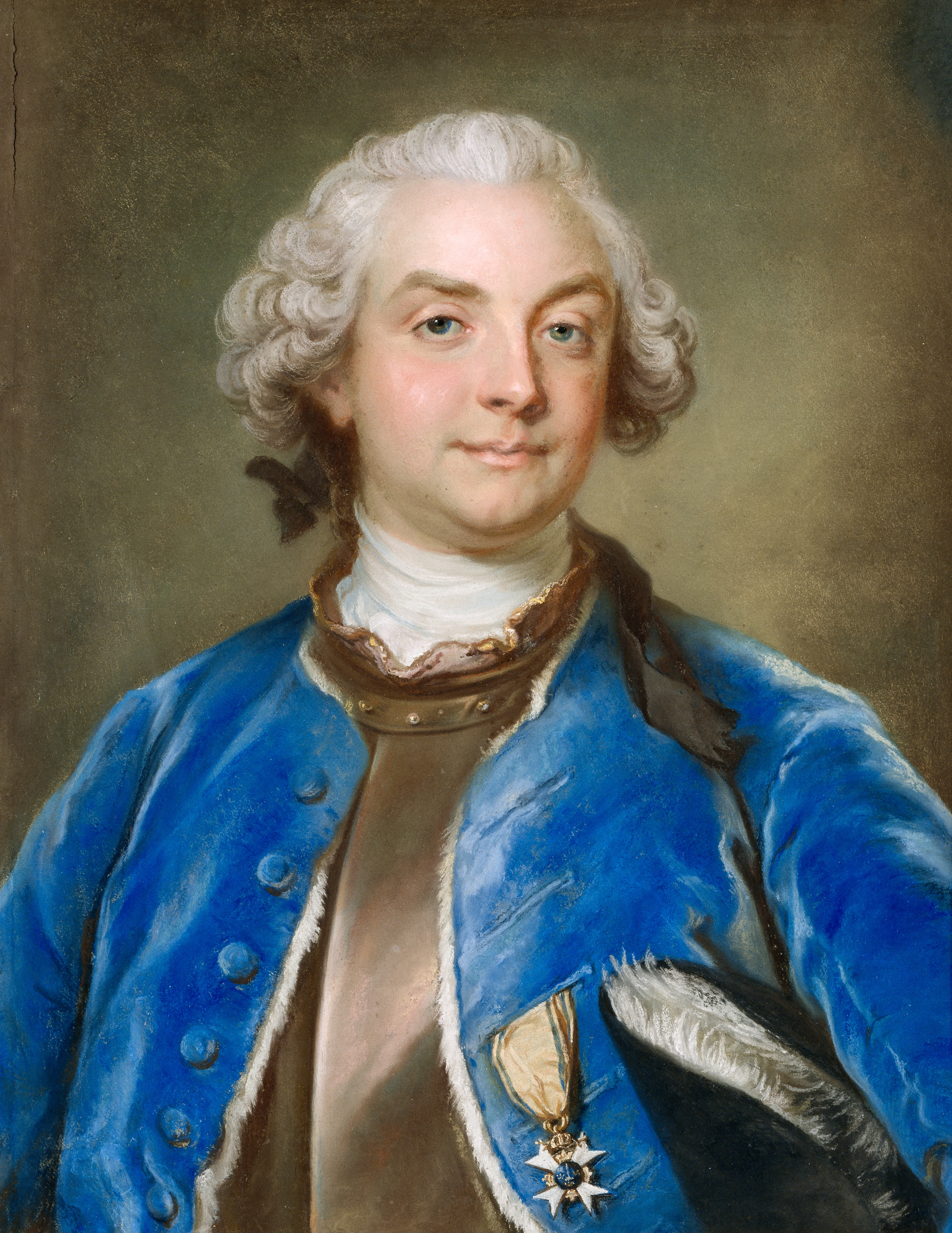
Axel von Fersen

On the accession of the Caps to power in 1766, Fersen refused to employ the Guards to keep order in the capital when King Adolf Frederick of Sweden, driven to desperation by the demands of the Caps, abdicated, and a seven days’ interregnum ensued. At the ensuing Riksdag of 1769, when the Hats returned to power, Fersen was again elected marshal of the diet, but he made no attempt to redeem his pre-election pledges to Crown Prince Gustavus (later Gustav III) that he would carry out a very necessary reform of the constitution, and thus involuntarily contributed to the subsequent establishment of absolutism. When Gustav ascended the throne in 1772, and attempted to reconcile the two factions by a composition which aimed at dividing all political power between them, Fersen said he despaired of quickly bringing the people back to the path of virtue and patriotism, after more than half a century of licence and corruption. Nevertheless, he consented to open negotiations with the Caps, and was the principal Hat representative on the abortive composition committee. During the revolution of August 1772, Fersen remained a passive spectator of the overthrow of the constitution, and was one of the first whom Gustavus summoned to his side after his triumph.

He obstructed the measures of Gustav III, whom he is said to have treated with colossal insolence, for several years. There was a slight collision between them as early as the diet of 1778, but at the diet of 1786, Fersen led the opposition against the king's financial measures, which were consequently rejected. He and twenty of his friends were arrested in 1789, leading to the collapse of the opposition; however, he was quickly released and thereafter remained aloof from politics.

His book Historiska Skrifter is mainly autobiographical, but its historical accounts are often biased.

He was one of the richest men in the realm. He was the lord of four grand houses in Sweden: Löfstad (inherited through his wife), Steninge, Ljung and Mälsåker. He also owned mines, land, forests and iron foundries in Sweden and Finland, and a large share of Sweden's East India Company, the country's most profitable undertaking ever.

Fersen was the father of Axel von Fersen the Younger and Sophie von Fersen, two of his four children with his wife Hedvig Catharina De la Gardie. His other two children were Fabian Reinhold von Fersen and Hedvig Eleonora von Fersen.

== Notes ==
Political offices
Preceded by Henning Adolf Gyllenborg	Lord Marshal of the Riksdag of the Estates; 1755–1756; 1760–1762	Succeeded by Thure Gustaf Rudbeck
Preceded by Thure Gustaf Rudbeck	Lord Marshal of the Riksdag of the Estates; 1771–1772	Succeeded by Axel Gabriel Leijonhufvud
Cultural offices
Preceded by First holder	Swedish Academy, Chair No 7; 1786–1794	Succeeded by Axel Gabriel Silverstolpe
