= Hedvig Amalia Charlotta Klinckowström =

Swedish artist (1777–1810)

Hedvig Amalia Charlotta von Klinckowström (4 June 1777 - 21 April 1810) was a Swedish countess, courtier and artist. She is known for her portraits and illustrations in drawings and miniatures on ivory, which are regarded to provide an historical valuable image of the contemporary Swedish aristocratic life.

She was the daughter of Baron Thure Leonard von Klinkowström and Hedvig Eleonora von Fersen. She married the nobleman colonel lieutenant Otto Reinhard Möllerswärd (1763-1802) in 1798 and Count Hans Gabriel Wachtmeister af Johannishus (1782-1871) in 1806. She served as statsfru (Lady of the Bedchamber) to the queen, Frederica of Baden, from 1800. She was active as a non-professional artist.
