= Carl von Fersen =

Swedish courtier (1716–1786)

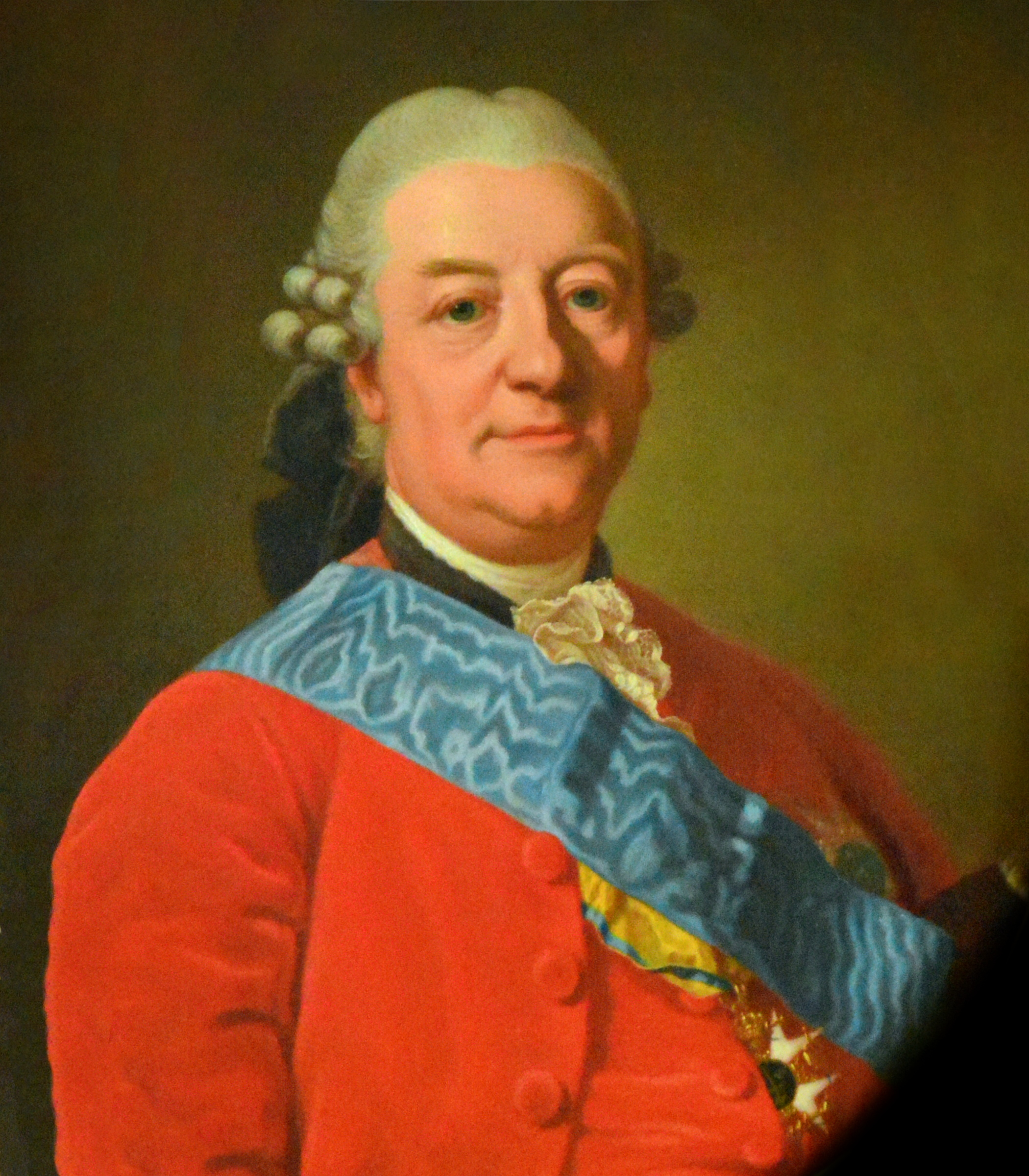
Portrait of Carl Reinhold von Fersen

Count Carl von Fersen (1716–1786), was a Swedish courtier of Baltic German descent. He was an amateur singer and a leading member of the amateur theater of king Gustav III of Sweden. He was also the director of the Royal Swedish Opera in 1780–86, and a member of the Royal Swedish Academy of Music (1772).

He was the son of Hans Reinhold von Fersen and Eleonora Margareta Wachtmeister and the brother of Axel von Fersen the Elder, and thus the uncle of Axel von Fersen the Younger. He married Charlotta Sparre and became the father of five daughters, notably Augusta Löwenhielm and Ulla von Höpken. Carl von Fersen spent most of his life at the royal court, where he was an appreciated participator of social life.
