= Friedrich August von Klinkowström =

German painter

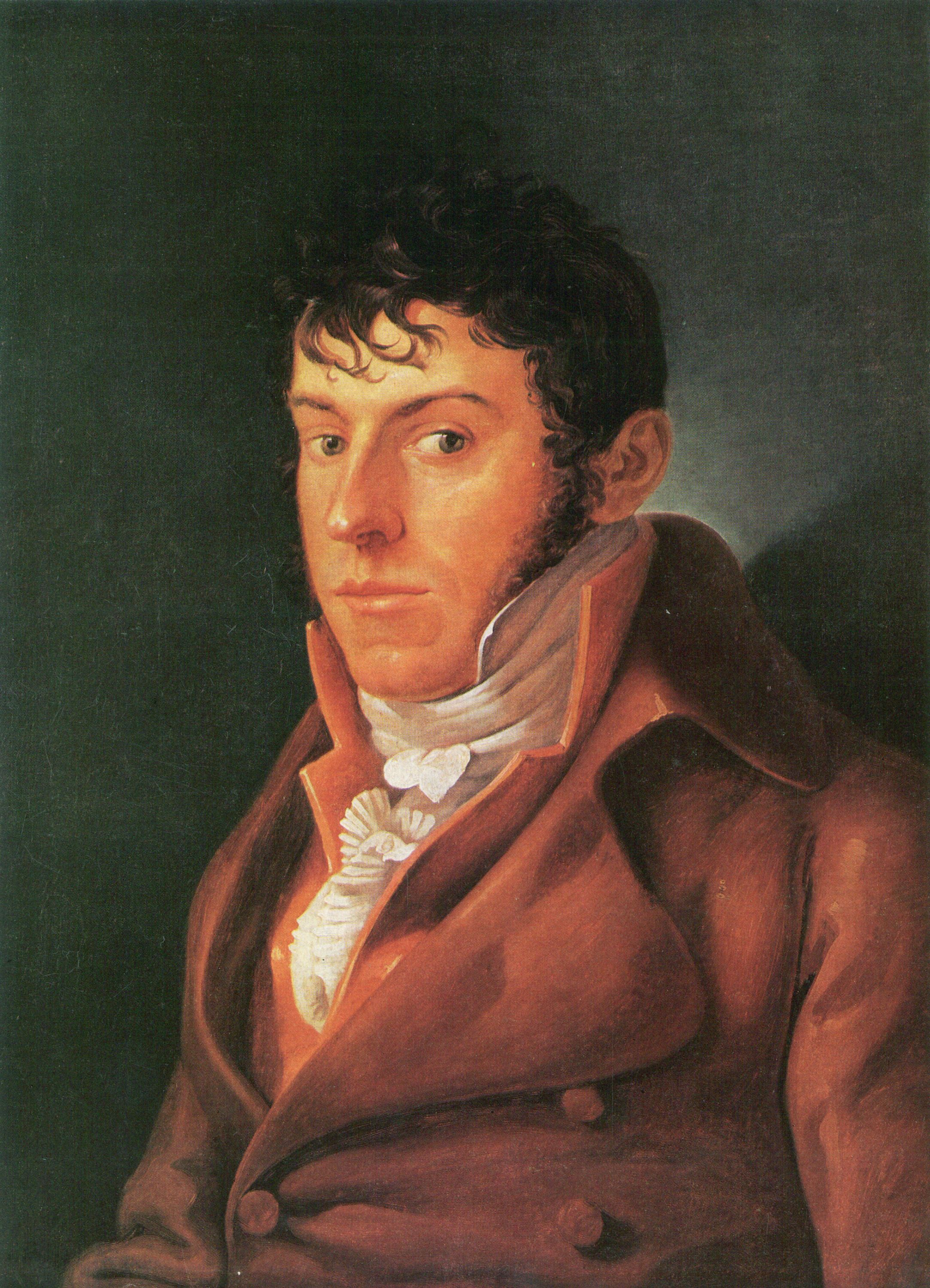
Friedrich August von Klinkowström, painted by Philipp Otto Runge, 1808

Friedrich August von Klinkowström (31 August 1778 – 4 April 1835) was a German artist, author and teacher from an old Pomeranian noble family.

== Biography ==
Klinkowström was born in Ludwigsburg in Swedish Pomerania to Friedrich Ernst Sebastian von Klinkowström (1735–1821) and Anna Louise Wilhelmine von Rosenberg-Gruszczyński (1751–1823). He began studying at the University of Greifswald, but, in deference to the wishes of his father, a lieutenant-colonel in the Swedish army, Friedrich served in the Prussian Army from 1793 to 1802. After this he was allowed to follow his own inclination and become a painter. To perfect himself in his studies, he went to the Dresden Gallery. His early pictures as well showed a strong leaning towards the Roman Catholic Church. After four years of successful study he was called home and obliged to remain there quietly for two years, owing to the depressed political condition of the country after the Battle of Jena. Then he decided to head for Rome, journeying first through Paris where the victorious Napoleon had amassed art treasures from many lands.

His stay in Paris lasted nearly two years, and terminated with his engagement. Finally in 1810 he started for Rome. But the quickly formed friendship with Thorvaldsen, Rauch, Overbeck, and other artists, only lasted a year, as Klinkowström was obliged to look about for an assured position. This led him to Vienna to take a place as instructor, and his marriage followed in 1812. But the grave political situation after the Battle of Leipzig led the quiet artist once again to join the army. He participated in the Landwehr in Leipzig, Dresden, and Aachen. After the Treaty of Paris he returned to Vienna, where he found that during his absence his wife had been received into the Roman Catholic Church by Klemens Hofbauer. When he was told of this, he exclaimed: "So Louise has become a Catholic before me." A few months after this he followed the example of his "dear Louise". Then there came three quiet years of painting and literary work. He devoted himself particularly to children's books for which he provided designs and illustrations.

There had been a plan under discussion for some time in Vienna to found a school for the sons of the higher nobility. But the difficulty was to find the right man, one qualified to undertake the work and carry it out within the provisions of the Austrian School Laws. With Klinkowström as its leader, the new foundation was opened in 1818, and enjoyed the personal favour of Emperor Francis I of Austria. The fact that the empress also showed an active interest in it naturally lent additional prestige to the school.

=== Death and legacy ===
Owing to ill-health and increasing suffering, Klinkowström was obliged in 1834, after sixteen years of personal guidance, to give over the schools to other hands. He died six months after this, his wife Friedrike Luise Charlotte von Mengershausen having died before him, in 1821.

Both of his oldest and youngest sons, Joseph and Max, entered the Jesuit Order, and became renowned preachers. The third son, Klemens, the head of the house in Austria, acquired as Imperial and Royal Archivist a literary fame, while the fourth son, Alphons, produced a biography of his father. The only daughter Maria joined the Order of Salesians after her father's death.

== See also ==
- List of German painters
