= Reinhold Johan von Fersen =

Swedish noble, military and county governor

Reinhold Johan von Fersen

Reinhold Johan von Fersen (1646, Tallinn – 1716, Stockholm) was the governor of Västerbotten County from 1688 to 1692 and of Halland County from 1705 to 1709. His son was Hans Reinhold Fersen (1683–1736).
