= Hedvig Catharina von Fersen =

Swedish noble

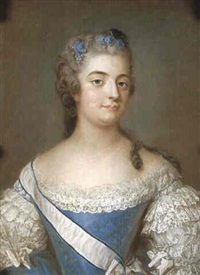
- Hedvig Catharina von Fersen
- Born: 20 May 1732; Stockholm
- Died: 24 April 1800; Stockholm
- Known for: Hedvig Catharina was the heir of Löfstad Castle. Through her marriage, she became the matriarch of one of the most powerful noble families in Sweden.

Hedvig Catharina von Fersen, née De la Gardie (20 May 1732 in Stockholm – 24 April 1800 in Stockholm) was a Swedish noble. She was the daughter of the General and riksråd count Magnus Julius De la Gardie and the political salonist Hedvig Catharina Lilje, and sister of scientist Eva Ekeblad.

== Life ==
She married the riksråd count Axel von Fersen the Elder in 1752. Hedvig Catharina was the heir of Löfstad Castle, and her marriage thereby strengthened both the social and economic position of her spouse. She became the mother of Hedvig Eleonora von Fersen (1753–1792), Hans Axel von Fersen (1755–1810), Sophie von Fersen (1757–1816), and Fabian Reinhold von Fersen (1762–1818).

Through her marriage, she became the matriarch of one of the most powerful noble families in Sweden and a riksrådinna (spouse of a riksråd), securing her a position in the very elite of the Swedish aristocracy, and socialized in the circles of the royal court: Queen Louisa Ulrika once referred to her and Eva Ekeblad as her only true friends. Despite her position, however, there are no mentions of her ever having played a political role, despite this being fashionable for women of her status during the Age of Liberty. She is sometime mentioned in passing in contemporary diaries and letters, such as in 1774, when her relative count Claes Julius Ekeblad mentioned in his correspondence to Brita Horn, that her spouse, Axel von Fersen the Elder, had recently been succeeded as the lover of Eva Löwen by her son, Hans Axel von Fersen, and that his aunt Hedvig Catharina von Fersen "has been affected enough by this to cry - she, who never hesitate to separate a man from his wife."

In the 1760s, the Crown prince, (the future Gustav III of Sweden), was rumoured to be in love with her. In 1764, Prince Gustav had the habit of walking on the roof terrace on the Royal Palace because he wanted to make contact with her and see her when she showed herself on the roof of the Fersen Palace every day at four; he sent her flowers and asked for meetings in the park of Karlberg Palace. It is not likely that the relation went further than this; Hedvig's attitude to the attention was described as "somewhat amused, somewhat quite dismissive". After 1772, when her spouse was made riksråd (councillor of state), she was known at court as riksrådinna, the feminine equivalent, and thereby given a high status. She was described as a close friend of Gustav III during his first years as a monarch: she belonged to the intimate circle of debate-partners with whom he stayed up late at night discussing, and he found her intelligent and cultivated. During his cultural reforms in replacing the French language with Swedish in culture life, such as at the opera and theatre, she was one he asked for advice; at the première of the Swedish language opera Zaire (1774), she was the only one of the women at court to contradict him regarding his reform by saying that the Swedish word for "darling" was inferior to its French equivalent.

In 1774, Hedvig Catharina von Fersen was assigned by Gustav III with the task to meet the bride of his brother Prince Charles, Hedvig Elisabeth Charlotte of Holstein-Gottorp, on her arrival to Sweden. She left for Wismar in Swedish Pomerania in May with a retinue containing the four appointed ladies-in-waiting to the princess, two male courtiers and her own daughter, Sophie von Fersen. She hosted the formal receptions for local dignitaries, welcomed the princess in July and organised the festivities when Charlotte was married by proxy to Charles, represented by the Swedish governor count Carl Otto von Höpken, and the ceremony when Charlotte took leave of her court from Eutin and changed it for her new Swedish court. It was said that "she maneuvered herself through the difficulties with fine tact and sense". She finally escorted princess Charlotte to Sweden proper for her next wedding in Stockholm. Charlotte became acquainted with her daughter Sophie during this meeting, and remained closely attached to the Fersen family.

The relationship between Hedvig Catharina von Fersen and Gustav III was damaged during a court scandal in February 1777. von Fersen refused her daughter, Sophie von Fersen, to attend a rehearsal of the ballet Le carneval de Venice. This was an amateur performance consisting of members of the royal court which was staged by the king in honor of his mother. Because of a confusion of the time, Sophie von Fersen would have been forced to wait dressed in her evening gown in the royal antechamber in the company of professional ballet dancers, which her mother considered to be shameful of her noble status. This refusal created a scandal at court, and a formal reconciliation was not made until princess Charlotte managed to mediate in the affair.

The relationship of the von Fersen family and the royal house was to become strained with time, especially during the crisis of 1789, when her spouse became arrested as one of the leaders of the nobility in opposition to the king's Union and Security Act.

Hedvig had the church of Ljung rebuilt and donated a collection of historical coins to it, which are still preserved there, in 1796. She was buried in the same church. She was widowed in 1794, and died six years later.

== See also ==
- Charlotte Du Rietz
