= Joseph von Klinkowström =

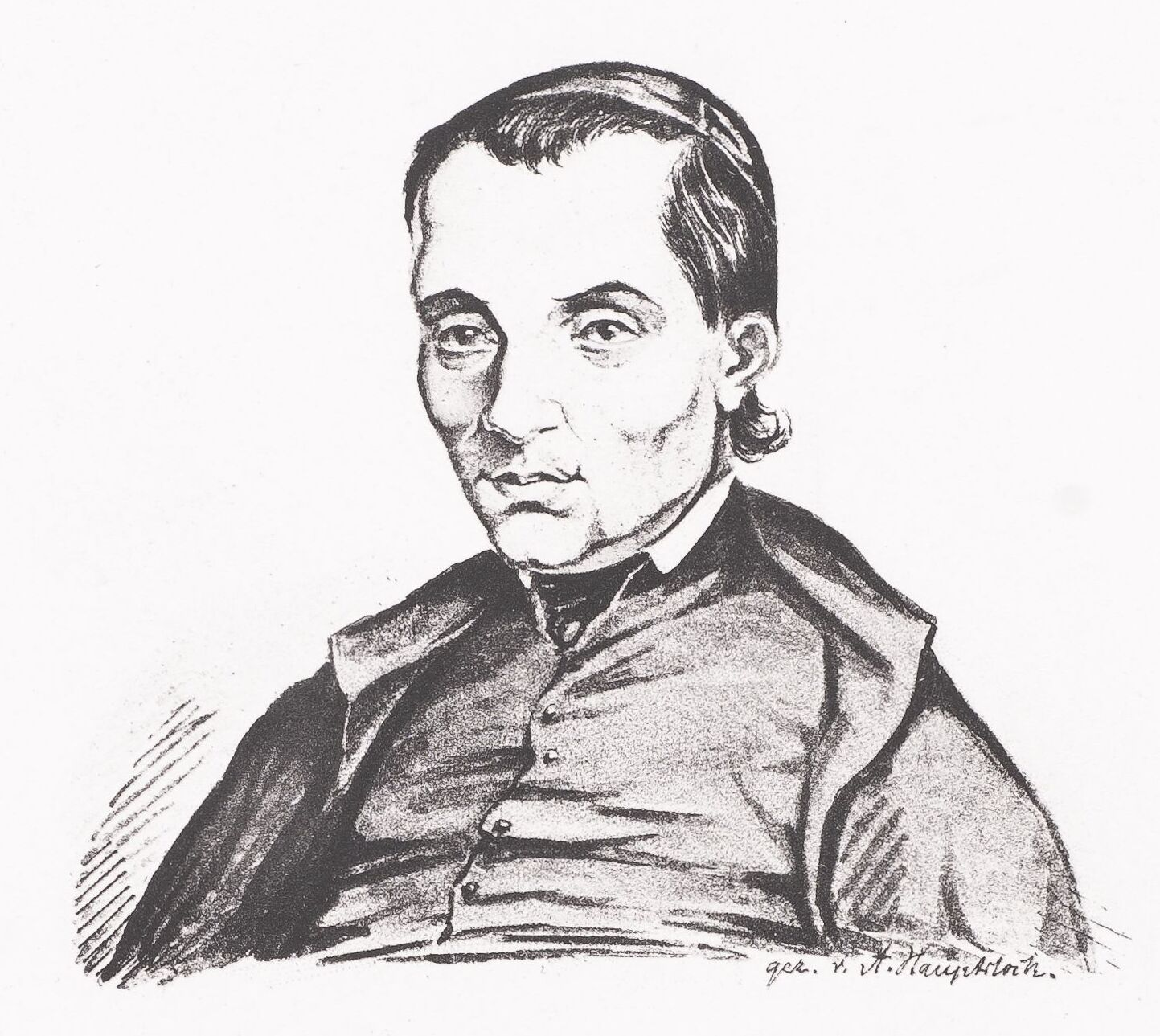
- Born: 30 August 1813
- Died: 30 March 1876 (aged 62)

Joseph von Klinkowström (30 August 1813 – 30 March 1876) was a Jesuit missionary and by birth, member of the Prussian Klinkowström noble family.

== Biography ==
Joseph was born as the eldest son of Friedrich August von Klinkowström and his wife, Friederike Louise Charlotte von Mengershausen. He received his early education at his father's school, and in 1831 entered the Jesuit novitiate in Graz. After completing his novitiate and the study of rhetoric and philosophy, he taught for three years in the lower forms of the Gymnasium. He made his theology in Rome, where he was ordained priest in 1846.

On his return to Graz he taught rhetoric, and subsequently, during the confusion caused by the revolution of 1848, held the position of tutor in a noble Westphalian family. When, two years later, a popular missionary movement began in Germany, Klinkowström was allotted to the German missionaries and proved himself to be efficient. He continued his efforts in Austria in 1852, and his sermons in Vienna led the emperor to express a desire to see him. The result of the interview was the establishment of a Jesuit community in Vienna. Here from 1859 to 1872, in which year his strength began to fail, Klinkowström continued his preaching activity.
