= Otto Johan Tandefelt =

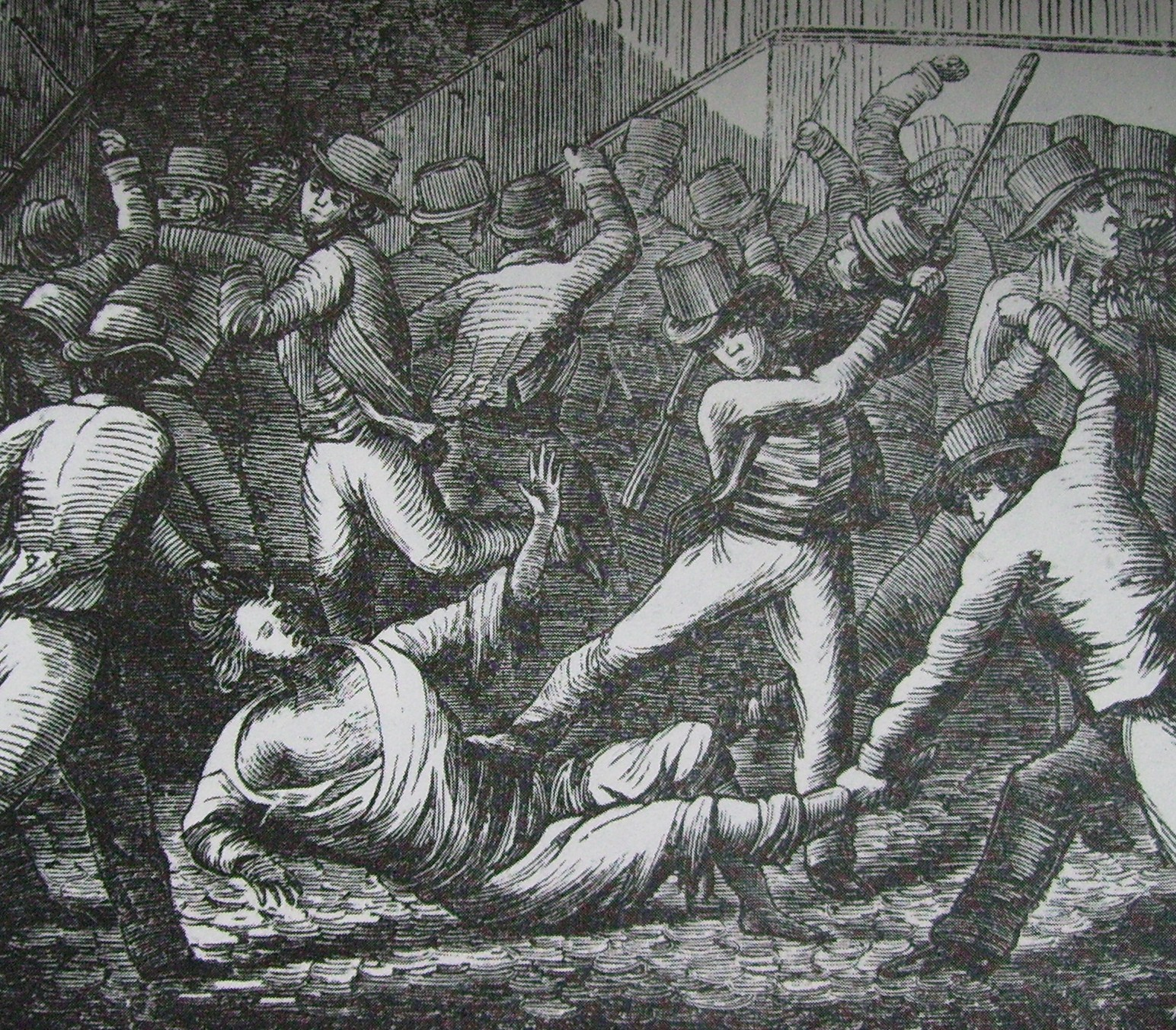
Von Fersen killed by the mob

Otto Johan Tandefelt (born 13 April 1782) was a Finnish murderer. He was a Swedish-speaking Finn and was born in Sysmä, Voipala, Finland.

He was a key figure in the lynching of Axel von Fersen on 20 June 1810 in Stockholm and was one of the very few to be charged and convicted for the killing. Von Fersen's death was determined to have been caused by the "crushing of the ribcage" when Tandefelt jumped with both feet on his chest. After serving some years at Älvsborg fortress, he was pardoned by King Charles XIII, and eventually emigrated, under the name of Pettersson, to the Americas, where he most likely died.

He was a nephew of Adolf Tandefelt, and the second cousin twice removed of the assassin Ernst Tandefelt.
