= Lövstad Castle =

Coordinates: 58.550°N 16.041°E

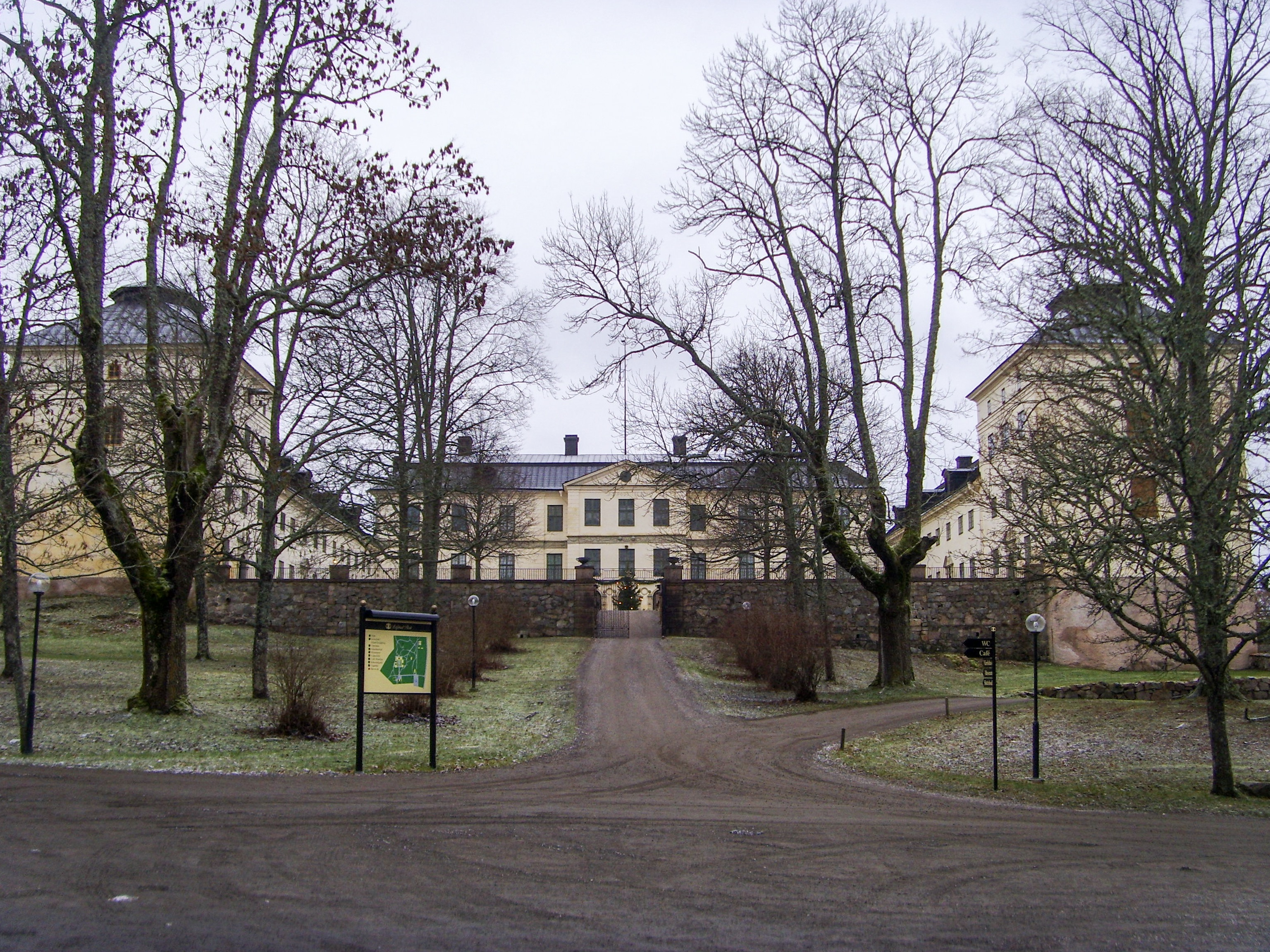
- Front view of the castle
- Interactive map of the Lövstad Castle area

General information
- Architectural style: Baroque
- Location: Sweden
- Construction started: 1630
- Completed: 1750s

Lövstad Castle (Swedish: Lövstads slott) is a château situated near Norrköping, the province of Östergötland, Sweden. The name is sometimes spelled Löfstad, which is according to old Swedish spelling rules.

Lövstad originated in the 15th century, but the present building was erected in the 17th century by Axel Lillie (1603–1662). It came to the von Fersen family through Hedvig Catharina De la Gardie (1695–1745) who was the heir of her mother Hedvig Catharina Lillie (1695-1745) who was the heir of Agneta Wrede. and to the Piper Family through Countess Sophie Piper (1757–1816), wife of Chamberlain Adolf Ludwig Piper (1750–1795) and sister of Count Axel von Fersen (1755–1810).

The present interior remained intact until the death of the last owner, Emilie Piper (1857-1926). Lövstad came under the ownership of the Östergötlands museum in 1940. The castle was opened to the public in 1942. Lövstad is today a museum open with guided tours.
