= Hedda von Fersen =

Swedish noble

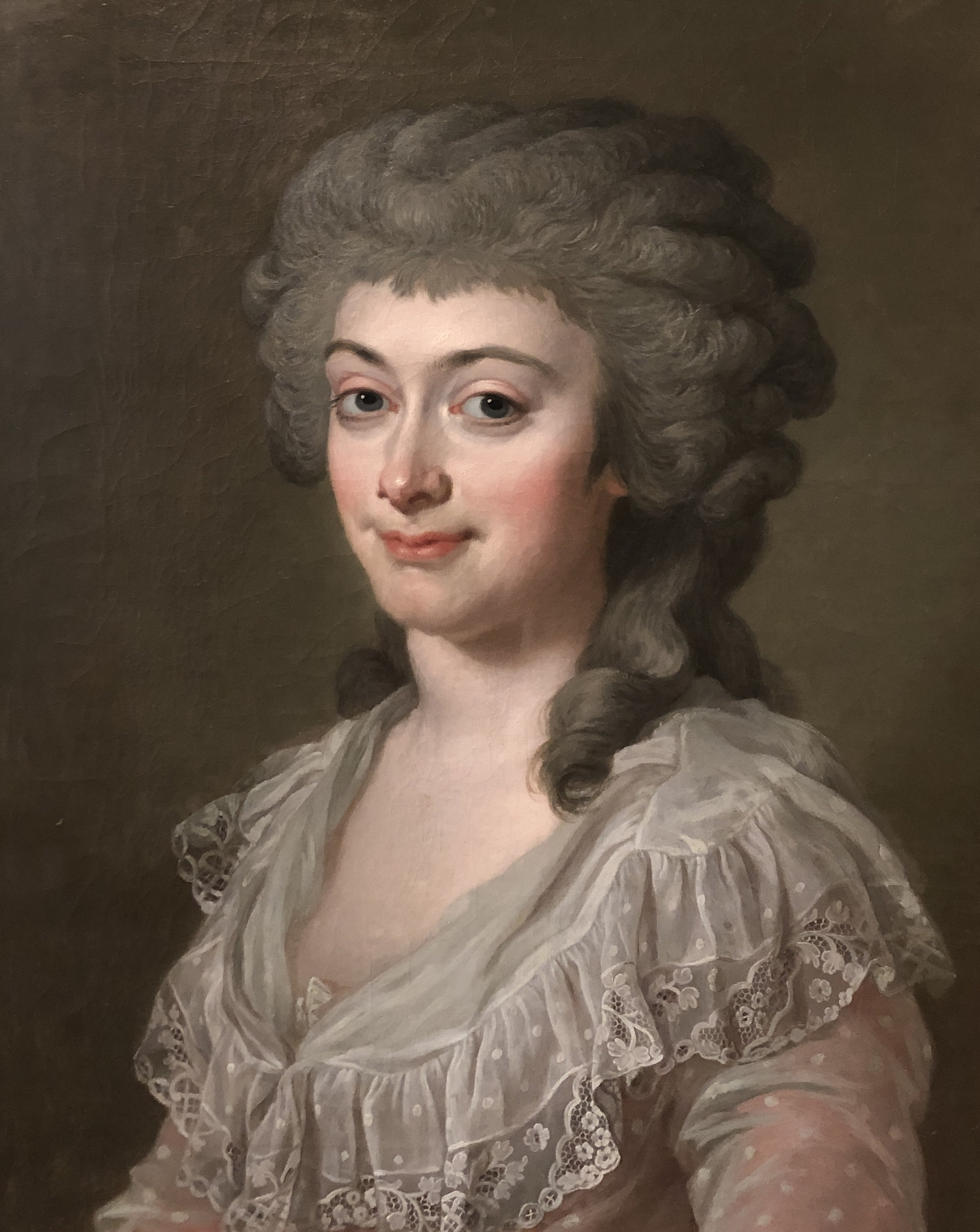
- Portrait by Lorens Pasch the Younger, c. 1790
- Born: Hedvig Eleonora von Fersen; 2 July 1753; Sweden
- Died: 8 November 1792 (aged 39); Pisa, Grand Duchy of Tuscany
- Buried: Old English Cemetery, Livorno
- Family: Klinkowström
- Spouse: Thure Leonard von Klinkowström
- Issue: 4 children, including Hedvig Amalia Charlotta
- Father: Axel von Fersen the Elder
- Mother: Hedvig Catharina De la Gardie
- Occupation: Lady-in-waiting

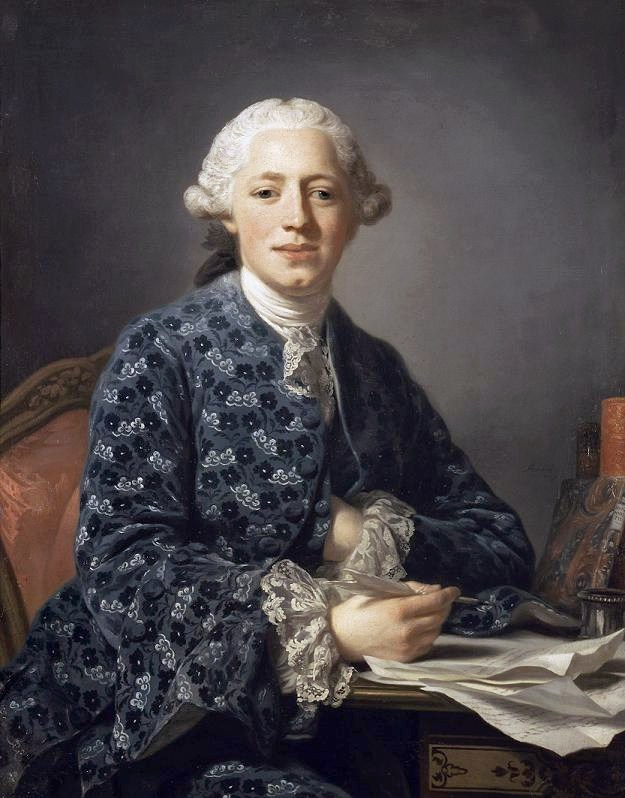
Hedda von Fersen's spouse, Thure Leonard von Klinkowström, by Alexander Roslin (1758)

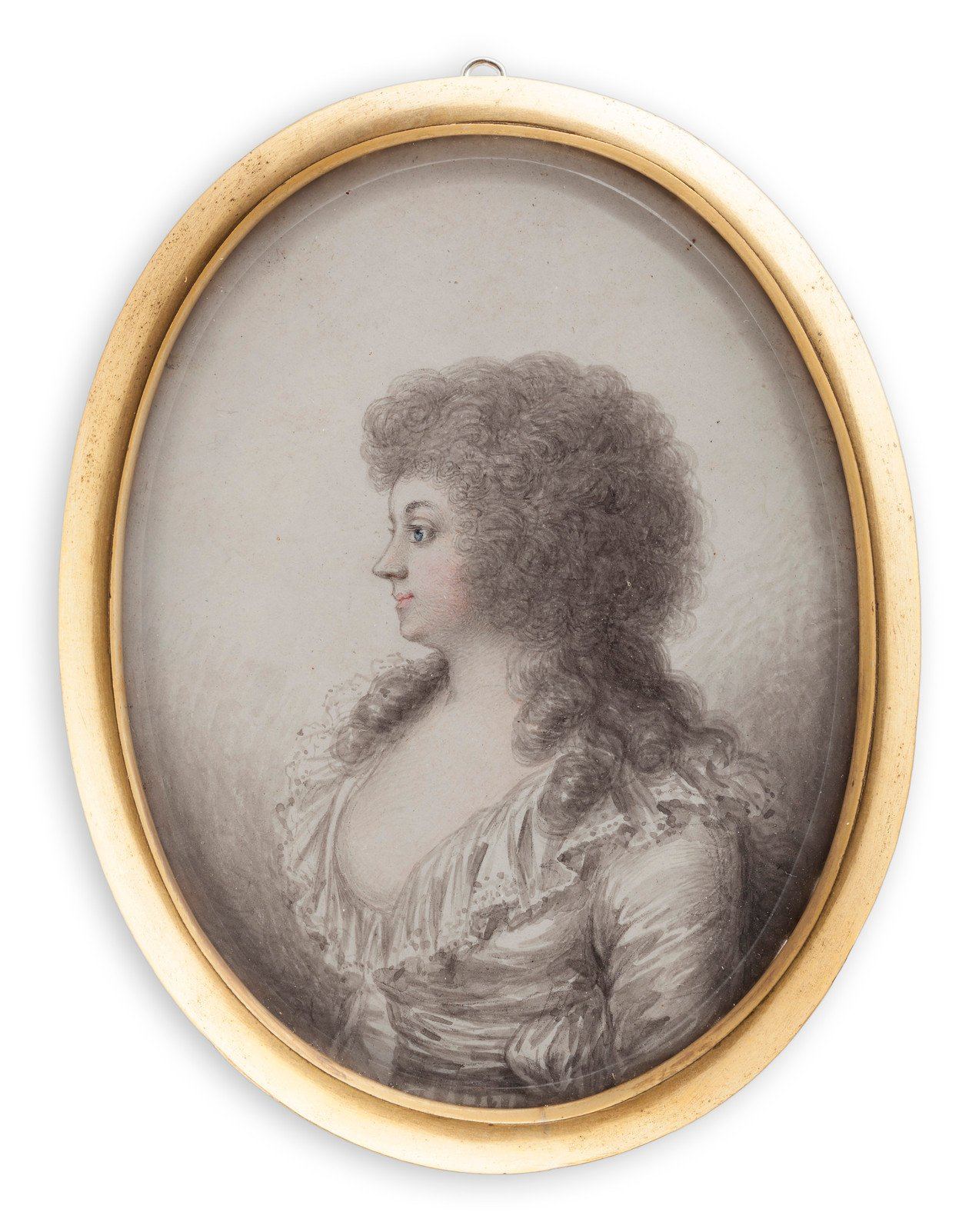
Hedvig Eleonora von Fersen by Fredric Philip Klingspor, Finnish National Gallery

Hedvig Eleonora "Hedda" von Fersen (2 July 1753 – 8 November 1792) was a Swedish noble and a lady in waiting to the Swedish queen, Sophia Magdalena of Denmark. She was the daughter of Axel von Fersen the Elder and Hedvig Catharina De la Gardie, and the sister of Axel von Fersen, Sophie Piper and Fabian von Fersen. In 1773, she married marshal Baron, later Count, Thure Leonard von Klinkowström in his second marriage, and with him had four children, among them were the artist Hedvig Amalia Charlotta Klinckowström and Axel Leonhard von Klinckowström, member of the Royal Swedish Academy of War Sciences and Société d'encouragement pour l'industrie nationale.

== Life ==
Hedvig Eleonora was given a high education by her father and acquired a reputation as a cultivated intellectual. It was said about her that she had "the most passionate mind, surpassing perhaps all other women in Sweden, along with the strongest soul."

=== Freemason ===
She is known to be one of five women to have been a member of the Freemasons in Sweden during the 18th century: alongside Sophie von Fersen, Countess Ulrica Catharina Brahe, and (not as surely documented but most likely) Christina Charlotta Stjerneld. She is confirmed as a member of a Freemasonic adoption lodge for women at court in 1776, when Princess Hedvig Elisabeth Charlotte was initiated by her consort Duke Charles as Grand Mistress of the female lodge.

=== Court life ===
In 1774, she accepted the position of statsfru (lady of the bedchamber) to the queen, Sophia Magdalena of Denmark. She accepted the position unwillingly upon the wish of her spouse, who wanted for her to accept it for economic reasons.

She was a friend of Princess Hedvig Elizabeth Charlotte, who described her as a truly good friend, witty and cleverly critical in the presence of friends, but also as distant to the world, indifferent to her appearance and often poorly dressed:

"Countess Klinckowström is amiable, agreeable, talented and educated, with a reliable character and a friend of her friends. She is otherwise distant to the outside world and observe its foolishness with an inner calm, especially everything which concerns the court. Her observation of events is actually quite satirical, but she is very careful and share her observations only to them whom she has given her confidence. It was with discontent she accepted the position of lady in waiting to the Queen, and only to please her consort, as it was his belief that it could be useful, as he is quite economical and could almost be called stingy. She is most certainly not very entertained by a position, which must trouble her, as she can find no pleasure in dressing herself up; in that aspect she is in fact quite careless."

According to Carl Fredrik Ehrensvärd, she was troubled by her court service, likely because "neither Faro (card game) nor the conversation to be found in that company, is to be united with her sense, wit and accomplishments."

Gustav III and Hedvig Eleonora was initially friends, and she is noted to have discussed political issues with him. In 1779, she made an unsuccessful attempt to convince him to make peace with his mother, the queen dowager Louisa Ulrika of Prussia, after a break caused by the queen dowager's support of the rumour that Gustav had hired Count Adolf Fredrik Munck af Fulkila to impregnate the queen and that Munck was the father of the heir. In 1782, she warned him not to be lenient with a religious sect, Collinisterna, which had caused disturbances

During the winter of 1776 at Gripsholm Castle, it is mentioned how she, the King and Jeanna von Lantingshausen persuaded Johan Gabriel Oxenstierna, Lewenhaupt and Adolf Ludvig Hamilton to join them in the prank to awake the sleeping courtiers from bed at night by surprising them in their beds. In 1782, it was noted how the Queen discovered her and her mother alone with the king in his bedroom while he was lying in bed, listening to Monvel reading a play.

In December 1775, she received a letter from Gustav III of Sweden asking her husband to recommend Bellman, "also called the Anacreon of Sweden" as king's secretary. He wrote: "You know that I loved poets and in particular Swedish ones. You know these gentlemen are always poor and always ask for support. You also know that their verse-craft is neither happy nor fruitful unless their purse is filled."

Bellman became secretary for 3,000 thalers per annum, of which he gave half to the person who held the service.

=== Conflict with Gustav III ===
Eventually, she came to belong to the opponents of Gustav III. At the stormy Assembly of the Estates in 1789, were Gustav III needed the support to continue the ongoing Russo-Swedish war, the monarch came into open conflict with the nobility, which was in opposition to the war and the Union and Security Act: he used the other estates to defeat the nobility and had many representatives of the nobility placed in house arrest and imprisoned. This caused a break between Gustav III and the nobility, and it was demonstrated by a social boycott of him led by the female members of the aristocracy: the noblewomen made a political demonstration of their opinions by turning down all private invitations and socializing with him in his capacity of a private person: they demonstrated by visiting the Princesses, Hedwig Elizabeth Charlotte of Holstein-Gottorp and Sophie Albertine of Sweden, who were also known to be in opposition to Gustav III, while at the same time turning down his invitations: this was instigated by Jeanna von Lantingshausen, and Hedvig Eleonora von Fersen belonged to the women who took part in the boycott.

Gustav III took deep offence of their "Fronde"-making and likened the noblewomen's way of political demonstration to the "hags" of the French Revolution and said himself to fear that they would storm him at the Gustav III's Pavilion as the Women's March on Versailles. He replied to their demonstration by writing and performing a play in which Johanna von Lantingshausen was publicly mocked. According to Elis Schröderheim, this demonstration made Gustav III lose his former friends, and to spend more time with his male favorites such as Georg Johan De Besche, in which he indulged in ill-reputed orgies with prostitutes.

The demonstration also led to a conflict with the Queen, Sophia Magdalena of Denmark, in the autumn of 1790. That autumn, the King chose to remain in the summer residence of Drottningholm Palace well in to the autumn because of the social boycott. Finally, the Queen returned to the capital without his consent, which made him accuse her of having been manipulated by the oppositional of the female courtiers to participate in the political demonstration and refusing him the company of her ladies-in-waiting by leaving: he suspected Hedvig Eleonora von Fersen to have persuaded the Queen to participate in the boycott. This is however not considered to have been true: though the Queen did oppose to the act of 1789, she is reported never to have allowed any one to speak of politics in her presence, and the reason to why she wished to leave was reportedly for health reasons, as Drottningholm was quite cold by that time of the year and she had been afflicted by an ear infection.

At his death bed in 1792, the monarch asked for Hedvig Eleonora von Fersen to meet him, as he wished to reconcile with her before he died, and asked her to make peace with him. She was buried in the Old English Cemetery, Livorno.
