= Klinkowström =

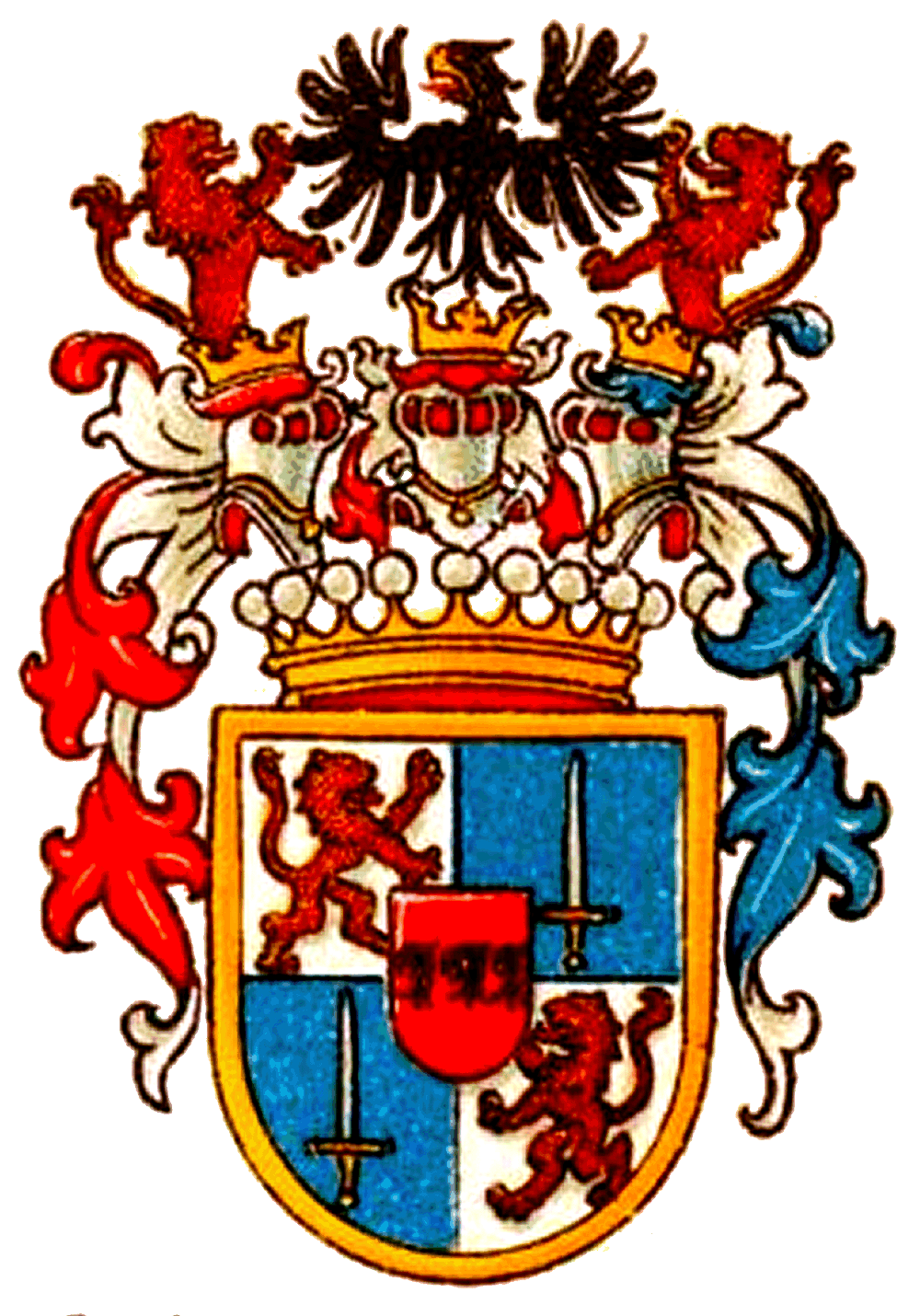
Coat of arms of the Counts von Klinkowström

Klinkowström or Klinckowström is a noble house of German origin with Prussian-Austrian and Swedish branches.

== History ==
The family probably originated from Klinkow near Prenzlau, Germany. They held positions in the city of Stralsund, such as Joachim Klinkow serving as its mayor during the 1559–1599 period. Members of the family that served in Sweden were first raised to hereditary nobility in 1678, when colonel Johann Klinckow was ennobled as "Klinckouenström". Some of their descendants moved to Prussia; Karl Friedrich von Klinckowström was given the title of Count by King Frederick William III in 1798.

== Notable members ==
- Carl Graf von Klinckowstroem (1884–1969), German cultural and technological historian
- Friedrich August von Klinkowström (1778–1835), a German artist, author and teacher
  - Joseph von Klinkowström (1813–1876), an Austrian Jesuit missionary; son of Friedrich August
- Friedrich Wilhelm von Klinckowström (1686–1750), Hanoverian lieutenant general
- Hedvig Eleonora von Klinckowström, née von Fersen (1753–1792), Swedish noble and a lady in waiting to the Swedish queen
- Karl Friedrich von Klinckowström (1738–1816), Prussian lieutenant general and count
