= Sophie Piper =

Swedish countess and lady in waiting (1757–1816)

Countess Sophie Piper
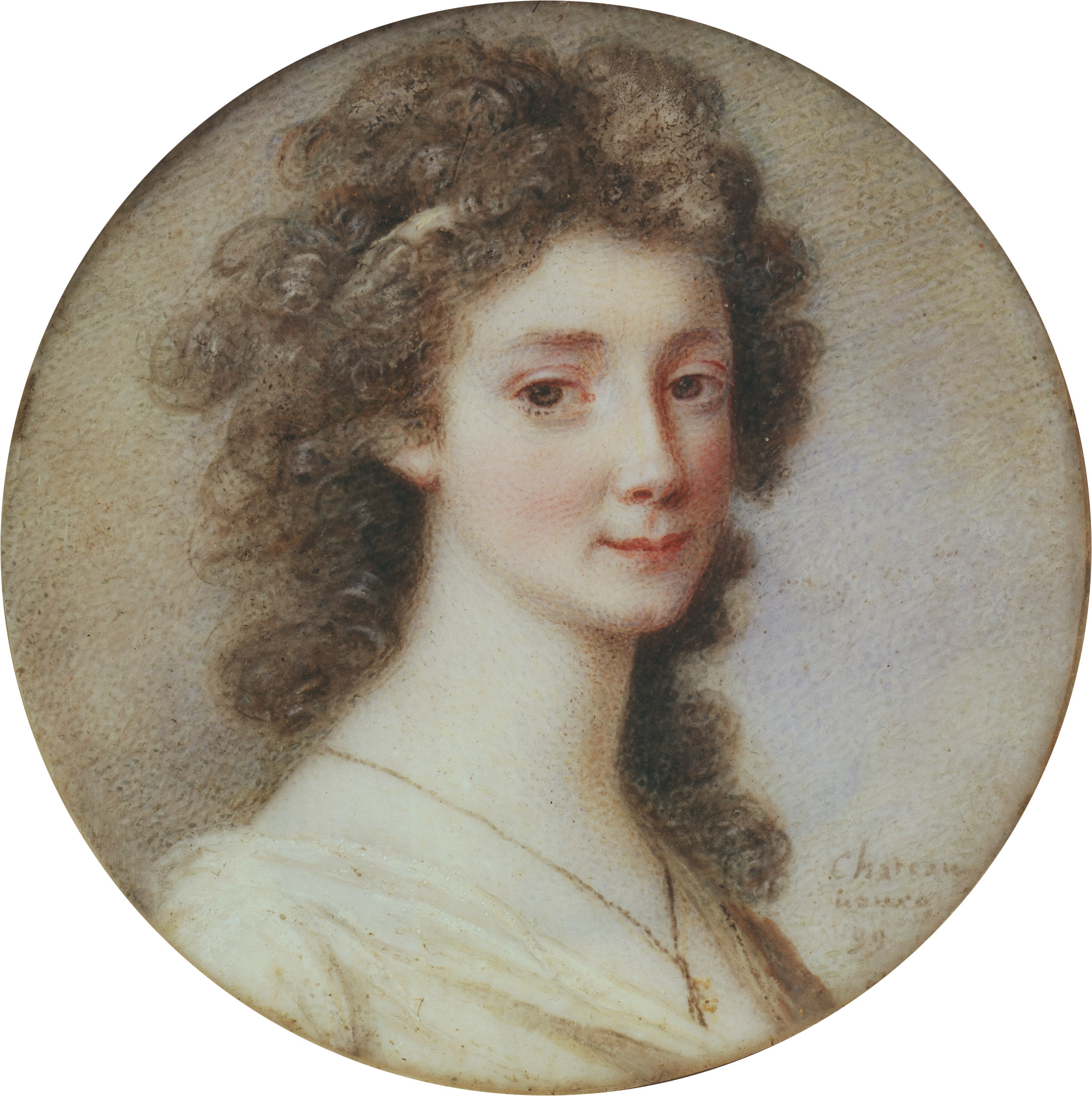
- Portrait of Sophie Piper by Charles Joseph de La Celle chevalier de Chateaubourg (1758–1837)
- Born: Eva Sophie von Fersen; 30 March 1757
- Died: 2 February 1816 (aged 58); Löfstad Slott
- Occupations: countess, lady in waiting
- Known for: Confidant of Hedvig Elizabeth Charlotte, confidant of Axel von Fersen the Younger, suspected of involvement in the death of Karl August.

Countess Eva Sophie Piper, née Eva Sophie von Fersen (30 March 1757 – 2 February 1816, Lövstad Castle), was a Swedish countess and lady in waiting. She was the daughter of count Axel von Fersen the Elder and Hedvig Catharina von Fersen, and the sister of Axel von Fersen the Younger, Hedvig Eleonora von Fersen and Fabian von Fersen (1762–1818). She is known primarily for her close relationship with Queen Hedvig Elizabeth Charlotte, who dedicated her famous diary to her.

== Life ==
=== Association with Prince Frederick ===
As a member of one of the most powerful noble families in Sweden, Sophie von Fersen often participated in court life, though she never served as hovfröken (maid of honor) prior to her marriage, which was otherwise common for a person of her status: both her cousins, Ulla von Höpken and Augusta von Fersen served at court prior to their marriage.

Sophie von Fersen was described as a beauty before her marriage. In 1774, she received a proposal from Duke Frederik Adolf, the king's youngest brother and third in line to the throne, who had previously proposed unsuccessfully to her cousin Ulrika von Fersen.

Her father forbade the marriage, since he had no wish to bind his family to the royal family. Both Sophie and her father feared that she would have been humiliated by the King and the Queen Dowager, who both disliked the match. An attempt to elope was prevented by the Duchess Charlotte. In 1777, Sophie von Fersen married chamberlain count Adolf Ludwig Piper (1750–1795).

The whole affair was described by the Duchess Charlotte, an account supported by that of her father. After Prince Frederick Adolf had proposed to Sophie, she informed the Princess, who welcomed her as a sister-in-law because of their friendship, but advised her to inform her father. When Frederick Adolf presented his proposal to her father in January 1774, her father declined with the motivation that it was not a suitable match, and that although honored, he must decline for the sake of loyalty to the royal house. Sophie was by that time already promised to Count Piper, because he was rich, and because the families were friends. Frederick Adolf was not met with open opposition by his family, but his mother, the Queen dowager, and his brother the King were, in fact, opposed to it. Fredrick Adolf was sent away, and the King and the Queen dowager proposed that Sophie be lady in waiting. Her father stated in his papers that the reason for this suggestion was to "abuse the youth and lack of experience of my daughter and, if they could, make her the official mistress of the Duke", and he therefore declined the position of lady in waiting for Sophie. When Frederick Adolf continued to be in love with Sophie von Fersen after two years had passed, he and his brother Duke Charles proposed to Sophie von Fersen that they would abduct her from a ball of the duchess Charlotte and bring her to Prince Frederick's residence Tullgarn Palace, where a priest would be waiting to perform the ceremony before it could be prevented. Sophie declined the offer after having consulted duchess Charlotte, mostly, as it seemed, out of pride. She informed Frederick Adolf of her decision at a masquerade ball in the presence of duchess Charlotte. When Frederick Adolf tried to convince her to change her mind, she was almost ready to do so, but asked duchess Charlotte to take her to another room, so that her feelings would not persuade her to accept.

After this, she accepted that her engagement to Count Piper was to be confirmed. After her marriage, Frederick Adolf left for Italy.

=== Association with Duchess Charlotte ===
Sophie Piper is known for her intimate friendship with Hedvig Elisabeth Charlotte of Holstein-Gottorp, the spouse of Charles XIII of Sweden. In May 1774, she accompanied her mother, who had been appointed by Gustav III of Sweden to welcome and escort the bride of his brother to Sweden. During the trip to Swedish Pomerania and back to Sweden, Sophie and Charlotte formed a very strong attachment with each other, and Charlotte was to be closely associated with the von Fersen family in Sweden.

From 1786 until 1800, Sophie Piper served as hovmästarinna to duchess Charlotte. The friendship between Sophie and Charlotte somewhat cooled after Sophie had refused to accompany Charlotte on her trip to Germany in 1798-99 in favor of going there separately with her lover. This was followed by her resignation as the chief lady in waiting of Charlotte's court in 1800, after which Charlotte stopped writing her journal in the form of letters to Sophie.

Duchess Charlotte dedicated her famous journal, written between 1775 and 1817, to her friend Sophie Piper, and until 1800, the journal is formally written in the form of letters to her. The letters were never sent, but written in this way as a dedication to Sophie Piper. The diary has been published between 1902 and 1942, and regarded as a valuable reference work of contemporary Sweden. The two friends also upheld a vast correspondence, which has been partially published. Duchess Charlotte once referred to Sophie Piper as the only true friend she ever owned, and upon the death of Piper in 1816, Charlotte wrote a biography of her.

=== Private life ===
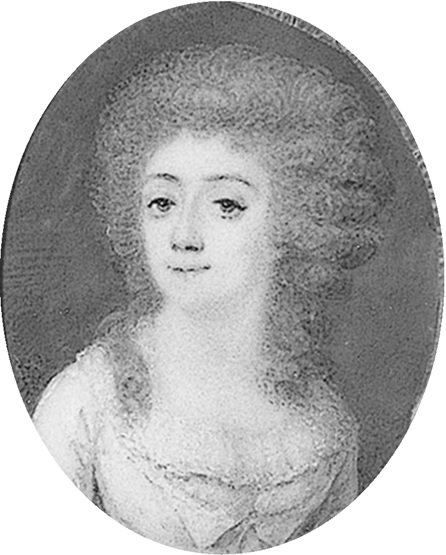
Portrait miniature by Anton Ulrik Berndes

Sophie married the chamberlain count Adolf Ludwig Piper (1750–1795), owner of Ängsö Castle, with whom she had two sons and two daughters, born between 1778 and 1785.

Sophie Piper was known for her love life in contemporary high society life. After her affair with Frederick Adolf, she fell in love with the Russian Prince Alexander Kurakin, whom Empress Catherine the Great had sent to Stockholm in 1776 at the head of a diplomatic delegation. He preserved her love letters, which vividly record her emotional state. In 1779, she had a relationship with the Spanish envoy marquess Liano y las Qanchas, who at one point lived at Ängsö Castle with her and her spouse, and later with the French envoy count Louis Claude Bigot de Saint-Croix, whom she shared with Eva Löwen, while her spouse was in turn the lover of Ulla von Höpken.

Sophie Piper is known to be one of five women to have been a member of the Freemasons in Sweden during the 18th century: alongside Hedvig Eleonora von Fersen, Countess Ulrica Catharina Brahe and (not as surely documented but most likely) Christina Charlotta Stjerneld, she is confirmed as a member of a Freemasonic adoption lodge for women at court in 1776, when Princess Hedvig Elisabeth Charlotte was initiated by her consort Duke Charles as Grand Mistress of the female lodge.

Sophie Piper was a close confidante to her brother Axel von Fersen the Younger, known as a favorite and rumored lover of Marie Antoinette – for reasons of caution the letters between Axel and Sophie make numerous references to that relationship, but out of caution Marie Antoinette is never referred to by name but always as "She" or "Josephine"; the Swedish historian Alma Söderhjelm has demonstrated that these are aliases for Marie Antoinette. In their correspondence, Sophie reproached Axel for his sexual relationship with Eleanore Sullivan out of consideration for the feelings of Marie Antoinette: "I truly hope that she will never find out about this, for it would give her great pain", and: "Think of Her, the poor one, spare her such mortal sorrows!" Out of consideration of the reputation of the late queen Marie Antoinette, the correspondence of Axel von Fersen was later censured and to some extent even burned when it included material which was considered to be harmful to the reputation of the late queen.

From 1784, it was noticed that Sophie was courted by Baron Evert Wilhelm Taube af Odenkat, cousin of Hedvig Taube, and from about 1790, they were known to be involved in a serious long-term relationship. This affair took place in parallel with the affair of her friend duchess Charlotte and her younger brother Fabian Reinhold von Fersen, and the two women gave each other messages in their letters referring to "F." and "T." In 1795, she was widowed, and her relationship with Taube became official. When duke Charles and duchess Charlotte left Sweden for their European journey in 1798, Sophie declared that she would also go to Germany, not as the lady in waiting in service of duchess Charlotte, but separately, with Baron Taube, a decision she fulfilled. In Germany, however, Taube died in Carlsbad, which was reportedly a great sorrow for her.

In 1800, her mother died, and her brother Axel von Fersen the Younger returned to settle in the family residence in Stockholm, after which Sophie resigned as chief lady in waiting of duchess Charlotte, intending to settle in her childhood home with her brother, who was unmarried, to keep his household and be his hostess.

=== The Fersen Murder ===
After the deposition of Gustav IV Adolf of Sweden in 1809, the Fersen siblings were known supporters of the Gustavian Party, who wished for the son of the deposed monarch to be acknowledged as heir to the throne. Instead, Carl August, prince of Augustenburg, was chosen. Like her brother Axel, Sophie fell under false and unfounded suspicion of involvement in crown prince Karl August's death in 1810. Both Sophie and Axel were rumored to have poisoned August. They were identified in a satire named Räfvarne ('Foxes') as the poisoners of the crown prince, and were punished in the satire with death.

Axel was killed in the street on 20 June 1810 by an angry mob while escorting the funeral possession of Carl August. This became known as the Fersen Murder. Sophie was also subjected to persecution on this occasion, but she managed to escape. She was warned that she would be forced to share his fate, and she therefore left Stockholm the same night disguised as a maid and sought refuge at Rydboholm Castle.

The day after, she was given permission by the king to be placed in safe custody at Vaxholm Castle. She demanded a court investigate her involvement in the death of the crown prince. She remained at Vaxholm until November 1810, when she was cleared from all charges. During the investigation, she received several proposals of marriage, including one from Georg Carl von Döbeln: she did not accept, but it led to a correspondence between them. Sophie was described as a charming beauty but was also feared for her ambition and sharp tongue.

She lived out her final years retired at Löfstad Castle near Norrköping.

== In fiction ==
Sophie von Fersen, alongside the fictitious Johanna and Hedvig Elisabeth Charlotte of Holstein-Gottorp, is one of the three main characters in the novel trilogy Barnbruden ('Child Bride') from 2013, Pottungen ('Chamber-pot child') from 2014, and Räfvhonan ('She Fox') from 2015, by Anna Laestadius Larsson. In the manga series The Rose of Versailles, Sophie makes an appearance in some chapters.
