= Hans Reinhold von Fersen =

Swedish count, politician and soldier

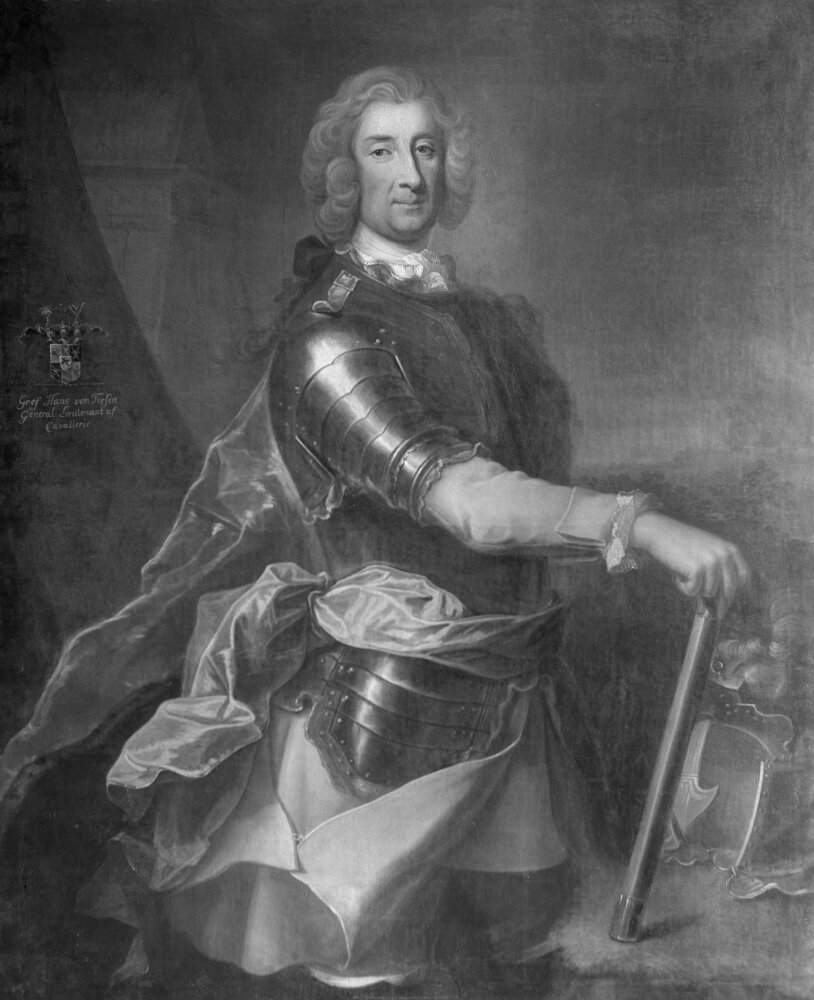
- Born: 2 March 1683; Tallinn
- Died: 25 May 1736 (aged 53); Stockholm
- Occupation: Military personnel
- Spouse(s): Grevinna Eleonora Margareta Wachtmeister af Mälsåker
- Children: 2
- Parent(s): Reinhold Johan von Fersen; Anna Sofia von Ungern-Sternberg

Hans Reinhold von Fersen (2 March 1683 Tallinn – 25 May 1736 Stockholm) was a Swedish count, politician and soldier of Baltic-German origin. He served as lieutenant general from 1720 and as president of the Svea Court of Appeal from 1731.

He was the son of count Reinhold Johan von Fersen and Anna Sophia von Ungern-Sternberg, likewise of Baltic German nobility. In 1715 he himself married countess Eleonora Margareta Wachtmeister, daughter of the royal counsellor Axel Wachtmeister. They had two children:

- Carl Reinhold von Fersen (7 April 1716, Stockholm – 7 May 1786, Stockholm)
- Fredrik Axel von Fersen (5 April 1719 – 24 April 1794)
