= Axel von Fersen the Younger =

Swedish count, marshal and general (1755–1810)

Count Axel von Fersen
- His Excellency The High Well-born
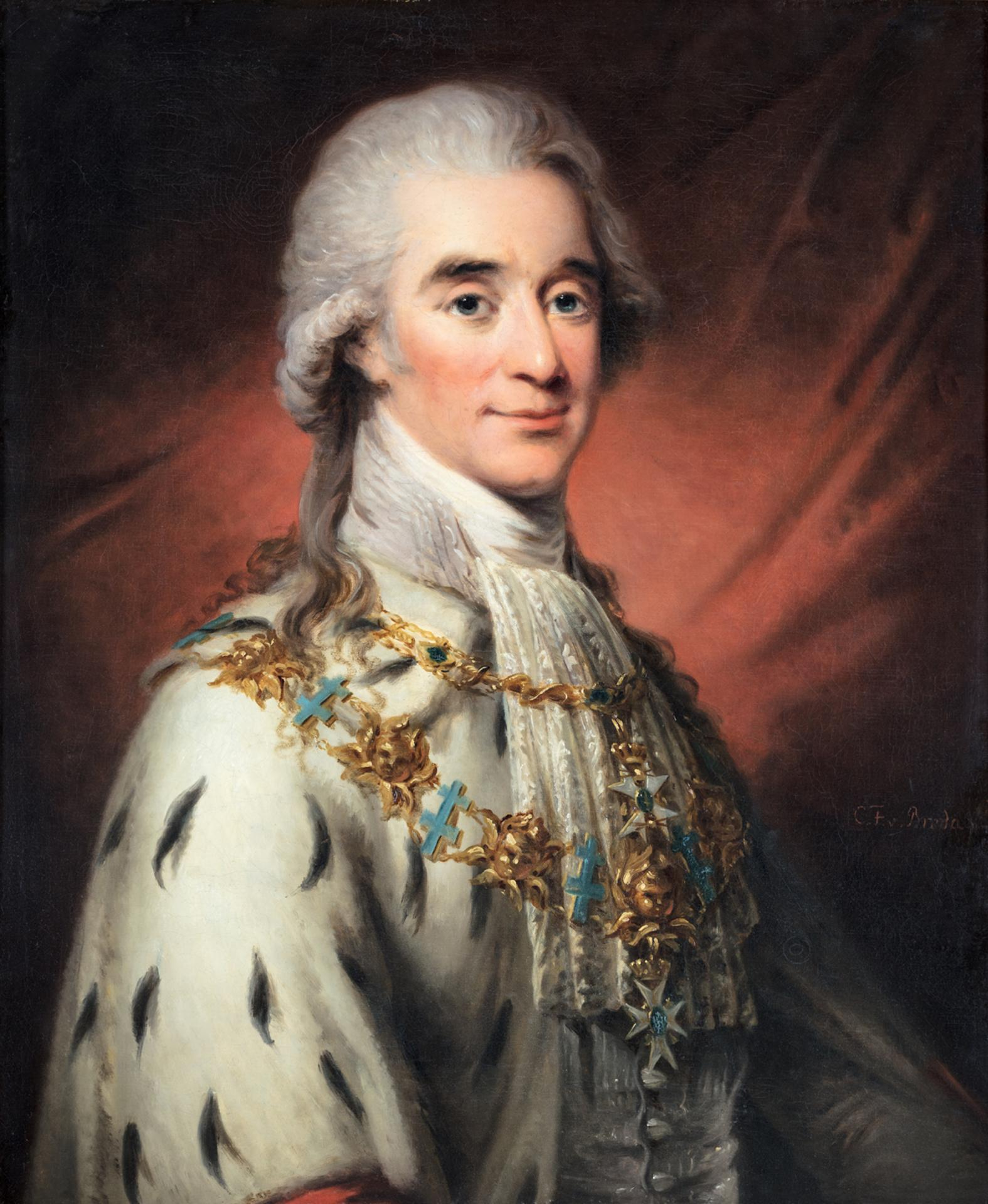
- Count Axel von Fersen, dressed in the robes of a Swedish Privy Councilor, with various chivalric orders (1800)

Marshal of the Realm
- Tenure: 1770–1810; 1770–1790
- Predecessor: Johan Gabriel Oxenstierna
- Successor: Magnus Stenbock

Lord of the Realm
- Titular tenure: 1799–1810

Minister to the King of France
- Tenure: 1790–1793
- Predecessor: Erik Magnus Staël von Holstein
- Successor: Erik Magnus Staël von Holstein

Minister to the Emperor of Austria
- Tenure: 1791–1791
- Predecessor: Lars von Engeström

Minister to the Second Congress of Rastatt
- Tenure: 1797–1798
- Predecessor: Position Established
- Successor: Position Abolished

Chancellor of Uppsala University
- Tenure: 1799–1810
- Predecessor: Gustav IV Adolf
- Successor: Charles XIV John
- Born: 4 September 1755; Stockholm, Sweden
- Died: 20 June 1810 (aged 54); Stockholm
- Burial: Ljungs kyrka, Östergötland
Names
- Hans Axel von Fresen
- House: von Fersen
- Father: Axel von Fersen the Elder
- Mother: Hedvig Catharina von Fersen
- Occupation: Politician; Diplomat; Military official

Military service
- Branch/service: Swedish Army; French Army
- Years of service: 1770–1810; 1770–1790
- Rank: Mestre de camp propriétaire of Régiment Royal-Suédois (France); General of Horse (Sweden)
- Battles/wars: American Revolutionary War; Russo-Swedish War (1788–1790)
- Awards: Knight of the Order of the Sword, 1781; Member of the Society of the Cincinnati, 1783; Member of the Institution of Military Merit, 1786; Knight Commander of the Order of the Sword, 1791; Knight Commander Grand Cross of the Order of the Sword, 1798; Knight of the Royal Order of the Seraphim, 1800.

Hans Axel von Fersen (Swedish: [hɑːns ˈǎksɛl fɔn ˈfæ̌ʂːɛn]; 4 September 1755 – 20 June 1810), also known as Axel von Fersen the Younger and as Axel de Fersen in France, was a Swedish count, military officer, courtier, ambassador, Marshal and Lord of the Realm. He gained international renown for his close association with Queen Marie Antoinette of France and his prominent involvement in the French Revolution.

Born into one of Sweden’s wealthiest and most influential noble families, von Fersen was raised in an environment shaped by French culture and courtly traditions. He received a thorough military education, travelled extensively throughout Europe, and served as an aide-de-camp in the French Army during the American Revolutionary War. He is most widely remembered for his close and often debated relationship with Marie Antoinette, which some historians believe developed into a romantic affair. Von Fersen became a trusted confidant of the French royal family and played a pivotal role in organizing and executing their ill-fated flight to Varennes in June 1791.

Following the outbreak of the French Revolution and the execution of the royal family, von Fersen continued to act as a diplomat on behalf of Kings Gustav III and Gustav IV Adolf of Sweden, working to preserve ties with the French monarchy and support its restoration. Returning to Sweden in the 1790s, he held several high-ranking positions, including Marshal of the Realm and Chancellor of Uppsala University. His life came to a violent end in June 1810, when he was killed by a lynch mob in Stockholm amid false rumors implicating him in the sudden death of Charles August, Crown Prince of Sweden. Subsequent investigations cleared him of all suspicion, and he was buried with honor. Von Fersen's life—particularly his ties to Marie Antoinette—has been widely portrayed in historical and fictional works, including films, television series, and stage productions.

== Life ==
=== Descent and early life ===
Axel von Fersen was born in 1755 to Field Marshal Axel von Fersen the Elder and countess Hedvig Catharina De la Gardie. He was nephew of Eva Ekeblad and grandson of General Hans Reinhold Fersen. Axel was the second of four children; he had two sisters, Hedvig Eleonora and Eva Sophie, and one brother, Fabian Reinhold. Two female cousins, Ulrika von Fersen and Christina Augusta von Fersen, were Swedish ladies-in-waiting and leading socialites of the Gustavian age.

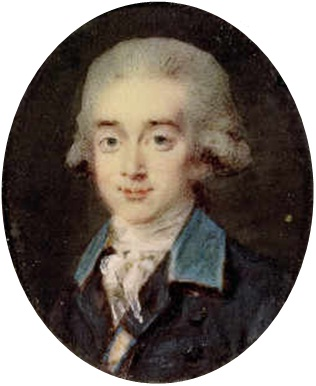
A young Axel von Fersen

Von Fersen's ancestors came from Estonia to Sweden at the time of the Thirty Years' War, which took place from 1618 to 1648. The family made their name during the reigns of Christina (queen regnant), Charles X Gustav, and Charles XI. In 1735, the von Fersen family purchased Steninge Palace, which overlooks Mälaren, a lake outside Stockholm. Von Fersen's father, the de facto parliamentary leader of the Hats party, was the most politically influential man in Sweden at that time and also one of the richest in the realm.

The younger Axel was influenced by French culture, owing in part to his father's services to Louis XV. Under his childhood tutor, von Fersen learned several languages including French, Latin, English, German and Italian. His later education was primarily military.

=== The grand tour (1771–1775) ===
On 3 July 1770, von Fersen made his first journey abroad with the intention of seeing the world and finishing his studies at military academies, including Brunswick, Turin, Strasbourg and Lüneburg. In October 1771, he passed through Switzerland and in Ferney, he met the philosopher, Voltaire.

In November 1772, von Fersen continued on to Turin, Italy, where he paid a visit to King Charles Emmanuel III. In January 1774 his travels took him to France where he paid court to the reigning monarch, Louis XV, and his mistress, Madame du Barry. While at Versailles he attended the ceremony of the Order of the Holy Spirit. A little over a week later, von Fersen met Marie Antoinette, then Dauphine, for the first time:

The Dauphine talked to me for a long time without me knowing who she was; at last when she was recognised, everybody pressed round her and she retired into a box at three o'clock: I left the ball.

Von Fersen allegedly replaced his father in 1774 as the lover of Ewa Löwen.

Von Fersen continued the Grand Tour by travelling to England where he stayed for roughly four months and met King George III and Queen Charlotte. By the beginning of 1775, von Fersen had returned to Sweden, where he remained for approximately three years, serving under his king, Gustavus III.

=== Marie Antoinette ===
In the late summer of 1778, von Fersen traveled to Normandy with his friend, the Baron de Stedingk, to see a large army camp that was training under the command of the Duke of Broglie. Besides military matters, they were treated to dinner and dances attended by the officers and their wives. Von Fersen later paid his respects to the French royal family for the first time since his grand tour more than three years earlier:

26 August: "Last Tuesday I went to Versailles to be presented to the royal family. The charming queen said when she saw me, 'Ah! Here is an old acquaintance.' The rest of the family did not say a word to me."

8 September: "The queen, who is the prettiest and most amiable princess that I know, has had the kindness to inquire about me often; she asked Creutz why I did not go to her card parties on Sundays; and hearing that I did go one Sunday when there was none, she sent me a sort of excuse. Her pregnancy advances and is quite visible."

19 November: The queen treats me with great kindness; I often pay her my court at her card games, and each time she makes to me little speeches that are full of good-will. As someone had told her of my Swedish uniform, she wished to see me in it; I am to go Thursday thus dressed, not to Court, but to the queen's apartments. She is the most amiable princess that I know."

Marie Antoinette's personal property, the Petit Trianon, was on the grounds of the Palace of Versailles. In contrast to Versailles, the dress and manners at the Petit Trianon were simple and down-to-earth; her guests were personally invited and treated equally, as friends. However, the private festivities often caused jealousy among those who were excluded from them.

=== The American Revolutionary War ===
In the 1770s, the American Revolutionary War began. France had officially declared war against her "natural enemy" (Great Britain) in February 1778, but it was not until 1780 that French troops were sent to America.

Von Fersen secured the position of aide-de-camp to General Rochambeau, commander of the expedition. On 4 May 1780, they sailed from Brest. Nearly two months later, the French landed at Narragansett Bay in Newport, Rhode Island, and made camp until June of the next year. In mid-September 1780, von Fersen accompanied Rochambeau to meet the American General George Washington in Hartford, Connecticut. On meeting Washington, von Fersen remarked:

He has the air of a hero; he is very cold, speaks little, but is polite and civil. An air of sadness pervades his whole countenance, which is not unbecoming to him, and makes him the more interesting.

After spending 11 months in Newport in total inaction, Rochambeau began a march on 12 June 1781, to link up with Washington's army at Philipsburg on the Hudson. On 15 August, von Fersen was tasked with conveying a letter from Rochambeau to Comte de Barras, who had been waiting for a signal to join Comte de Grasse's fleet on Chesapeake Bay. In early September, de Grasse defeated the British fleet in the Chesapeake, and by the end of the month Washington surrounded Cornwallis in Yorktown. On 19 October, the British surrendered, hastening the end of the war.

Von Fersen spent the winter in Williamsburg with the French army. Anticipating the American Civil War nearly 80 years later, von Fersen remarked that he wouldn't be surprised to see Virginia separate herself from the rest of the states at some point due to the strain of "aristocracy" prevalent there as opposed to the northern states. In December 1782, the French made sail for the West Indies and Venezuela, but word reached them of the signing of peace and the ships headed back to France. Von Fersen arrived back in France in June 1783.

=== Years leading up to the Revolution (1783–1787) ===
Following the end of hostilities, the United States and Sweden concluded a Treaty of Amity and Commerce. Von Fersen was awarded the Order of Cincinnatus by Washington, though he was forbidden by his monarch to wear a medallion earned fighting in a republican war.

In 1783, Gustavus III asked von Fersen to join him in Germany as Captain of the Guard. Gustavus was planning on making war on Denmark, and was on a trip through the Continent to secure aid from other countries. Gustavus promoted von Fersen to titulary-colonel in the Swedish army, chevalier of the Order of the Sword, and lieutenant-colonel of the light-horse cavalry of the King. Gustavus also used his influence to persuade Louis to have von Fersen appointed proprietary colonel of the Royal Suédois French Army infantry regiment. Louis also appointed von Fersen second-colonel of the Royal Deux-Ponts regiment and chevalier of the Order of Military Merit.

On 7 June 1784 von Fersen returned to Versailles with Gustavus, who concluded a treaty of alliance with France on the 19th of the month. On 27 June, Gustavus and the rest of his entourage were invited to the Petit Trianon. Von Fersen sat in the royal box beside Marie-Antoinette. A month later von Fersen returned to Sweden, tasking himself with the job of getting a dog for Marie Antoinette, which she named Odin.

Von Fersen divided his time between Paris, Versailles, and his new regiment in Valenciennes. During this time, the Diamond Necklace Affair took place, and only months later the Cardinal de Rohan was arrested, bringing the affair to public knowledge. Von Fersen wrote to his father in September that everyone believed the Queen (Marie Antoinette) had fooled the King. In August 1786, Vicomte de Calonne finally apprised Louis XVI of the desperate state of the French finances, and by the very end of the year it was announced that there would be a convening of an Assembly of Notables to discuss future measures.

=== The French Revolution ===
In late-February 1787, the Assembly of Notables was convened. Von Fersen attended the closing of the last day of that meeting, and described the gathering as "imposing". Von Fersen was secretly entrusted, by Gustavus III, with the role of special envoy to the King and Queen of France. Some sensitive diplomatic contacts between Sweden and France were conducted, not through the Swedish embassy, but through von Fersen. To be closer to Paris, he moved into a house in Auteuil borrowed from Count Esterhazy.

In spring, 1788, von Fersen joined Gustav for the latter's Finnish campaign against Russia as lieutenant-colonel of the Royal Horse Guards, but by December 1788, von Fersen was again with his French regiment in Valenciennes to witness the following:

All men's minds are in a ferment. Nothing is talked of but a constitution. The women especially are joining in the hubbub, and you know as well as I what influence they have in this country. It is a mania, everybody is an administrator and can talk only of progress; the lackeys in the antechambers are occupied in reading the pamphlets that come out, ten or twelve in a day, and I do not know how the printing-presses can do the work.

On 2 May 1789, the Estates-General finally met. Von Fersen and Beaumont sat in one of the boxes of the Salle des Menus Plaisirs on 5 May, as Louis read his opening speech. Before long, however, the Third Estate reconstituted itself as the National Assembly, arguing that the three orders were no more than arbitrary divisions of one body. By the end of June, the monarchy had reinforced its concentration of regiments around the capital, ostensibly to maintain order in and around Paris, although many believed the troops would be turned against the recalcitrant Third Estate. Von Fersen wrote:

They have brought about 12,000 to 15,000 troops into the neighborhood of Versailles, La Muette, Meudon, etc. What is most grievous is that they are not sure of the French soldier, and they are forced to employ foreigners as much as possible.

On 14 July 1789, the Invalides and the Bastille were both stormed and taken, and on 16 July, von Fersen was at Versailles with the King and Queen to debate how to forestall the incipient revolution in Paris. After much discussion, Louis decided to go to Paris with the guardsmen to show his personal goodwill towards the revolution. The Princess de Lamballe (who in 1792 would lose her life in the September Massacres) related the scene:

No sooner, however, had the king left the room than it was as much as the Count de Fersen, Princess Elizabeth, and all of us could do to recover [the Queen] from the most violent convulsions. At last, coming to herself, she retired ... at the same time requesting Fersen to follow [Louis] to the Hôtel de Ville. Again and again she implored him, as she went, in case the king should be detained, to interest himself with all the foreign ministers to interpose for his liberation.

Von Fersen followed Louis to the capital and arrived in time to watch Louis take the national cockade from the mayor, Jean Sylvain Bailly, and placed it in his own hat. On 8 August, the August Decrees, which abolished many aspects of monarchy, including tithes and hereditary titles, were enacted. Von Fersen wrote from Valenciennes:

Riots are taking place in all the cities of the kingdom ... So far all is confined to breaking into the tax offices and opening the prisons, for it is the lowest of the populace who make the disorder. The bourgeoisie was immediately armed and that did much to restore tranquility. We have had our little riot here but it is all over. Now the idle scoundrels have spread themselves over the country districts; they are pillaging, or putting under contribution all the abbeys and châteaux. They are hunted everywhere, and yesterday, in one spot, we captured 119; many more will probably be taken ... Disorder is increasing throughout the country. The [new militia in Paris] has better pay than in our regiments and there are no means not employed to entice them. It is said that ... there have been, since July 13th, 12,750 deserters, without counting the gardes françaises. The king's authority is totally annihilated, so is that of the parliaments and the magistrates. The States-General themselves tremble before Paris, and this fear greatly influences their deliberations.

Months later, with the revolution spreading to the rest of the country and the royal army in disintegration, the Flanders Regiment was brought to Versailles to replace the French Guards who had mutinied. The King's bodyguard decided to host a fraternal dinner party for the regiment, and von Fersen and Beaumont attended. Despite having reservations at first, the King and Queen made an appearance towards the end. This banquet, however, provided fuel for the Women's March on Versailles four days later, when it was rumored that the tricolour (cockade) was trampled upon at the banquet. Von Fersen was in Versailles to witness the march.

On the morning of 6 October 1789, an armed crowd made their way to the royal apartments. Two of the royal bodyguards were killed before the National Guard restored order. In order to calm the protestors, Louis agreed to go to the balcony of the Cour de Marbre and tell the crowd that he would return with them to Paris. Von Fersen recounts the departure in his diaries:

I was witness of it all and I returned to Paris in one of the carriages of the king's suite: we were six hours and a half on the way [to Paris]. God keep me from ever again seeing so afflicting a sight as that of those two days.

=== Flight to Varennes ===
The situation of the royal family became considerably more desperate on 18 April 1791, when they were prevented from travelling to Saint-Cloud to attend Mass by a large hostile crowd. Escape plans had been broached earlier between Comte de Mirabeau and von Fersen, but Mirabeau's death on 2 April 1791 put an end to that discussion. Following the aborted trip to Saint Cloud, von Fersen revived these plans with vigor. In June, he acquired a Berline and drove it to a courtyard at Eleanore Sullivan's residence on the Rue de Clichy in Paris. The escape was arranged to take place on 20 June, coinciding with a particular guard change.

At 11:15 p.m. the royal children were brought out without difficulty. At 11:45, the king's sister, Madame Elizabeth, appeared, followed by Louis himself. Half an hour later they were still waiting for Marie Antoinette. However, she came out at the same time as the torchlit carriage of Marquis de Lafayette, who was responsible for the royal family's custody, appeared with some of his men. Marie Antoinette was able to conceal herself and the royal family slipped away.

Von Fersen drove the carriage, first from the Place du Carrousel to the Porte Saint-Martin, and then on to the Barrier Saint-Martin where they switched to the Berline. Von Fersen continued to drive as far as Bondy, seven miles from Paris, where the Queen's maids and a fresh relay of horses awaited them. The royal family took the post road and von Fersen took a different route to Bourget.

The royal family reached Varennes on 22 June around 11 p.m., but here they were discovered and eventually held in custody until troops from the National Convention arrived. They departed Varennes surrounded by 6,000 armed citizens and National Guardsmen. Having left behind him a long declaration which had been read and published in all the newspapers in his absence, Louis himself had made it impossible to sustain the pretence that he had been "abducted".

=== War against France (1791–1793) ===
Even before the royal family returned to Paris, it was discovered that von Fersen was one of the people who facilitated their escape, and a warrant was put out for his arrest. Von Fersen left France and in Koblenz he put himself in touch with Comte d'Artois, the exiled prince, and Charles Alexandre de Calonne, the former Controller-General; together they made plans to convince the other European powers to declare war on France. In Brussels, von Fersen worked out a steganography technique for writing with Marie Antoinette.

From 2–14 August, von Fersen was in Vienna to discuss the situation with Marie Antoinette's brother Leopold, now Emperor. On 27 August 1791 the Declaration of Pillnitz was issued from Pillnitz Castle near Dresden; it declared the joint support of the Holy Roman Empire and Prussia for King Louis XVI against the Revolution but stipulated that Austria would only go to war if the other European powers followed them into war, which at this point in time was not likely to happen. Von Fersen wrote:

I can see clearly that they are dragging things along purposely to prevent the King of Sweden from sending troops this year; they fear his activity, and also that he may command in person. They want to avoid acting, or else to act alone if it becomes necessary. Nothing is being done; the requisitions have not been sent, although they assure me the troops are to march at once ... I see a well-formed plan to do only trifling things over the winter, to try to patch up matters for the time being, and not to act until spring, and not then unless it is absolutely necessary.

On 16 March 1792, Gustav III was shot at the Royal Opera House in Stockholm, and died almost two weeks later. In Sweden, Gustav's younger brother, the Duke Karl, became regent to the underage Gustav IV Adolf. On 20 April, France officially declared war on Austria, and invaded the Austrian Netherlands. On 20 June, the Tuileries was stormed by a large crowd and Louis was made to wear a red bonnet of liberty and drink a toast to the health of the people of Paris and the Nation. Three days later Marie-Antoinette was able to get an encrypted letter out to von Fersen: "Your friend is in the greatest danger. His illness is making terrible progress ... Tell his relations about his unfortunate situation".

On 7 November, following the French victory at Jemappes, von Fersen wrote from Brussels:

Breteuil came to tell me that the Austrians have been defeated before Mons ... that retreat from Brussels is decided on ... At nine o’clock the news was made public; consternation and fear general; nothing as seen but people running about in search for means to get away. For two days there had been orders to give no post-horses without permission ... The whole road from Mons was covered with war equipages and carts with wounded.

On 21 January 1793, Louis XVI was guillotined at the Place de la Révolution. Von Fersen heard the news while in Cologne: "Received last night at 10:30, from the Archbishop of Tours, the sad details of the death of the King of France". On 1 February, France officially declared war against Great Britain and the Dutch Republic, but the tide quickly turned against the French in the Netherlands. The general in charge of the northern army, Dumouriez, was defeated 18 March at Neerwinden and Louvain. On 18 March, von Fersen was able to meet with him:

We struggled through a crowd of people and found him in a lower room, the windows besieged by the people outside. He was alone with three aides-de-camp. He recognised Simolin [Russian ambassador to France]; I named myself; he made me a compliment, saying he ought to have known me by my handsome face ... On the whole, I found him a true Frenchman, vain, confident, heedless; with much intelligence and little judgement. His scheme failed through excess of confidence in his strength and in his influence with the army.

On 2 August, Marie Antoinette was moved to the Conciergerie while awaiting her trial. During this time von Fersen was still attempting to find a way to save her and the remaining royal family. On 11 August he wrote:

Having talked with La Marck on the means of saving the queen, and agreeing that there were none except to push forward at once a strong body of cavalry to Paris - which would be the easier to do at this moment, because there are no troops before the city and the granaries are full, - I went to see Mercy about it and found him all ice to the idea ... He believes the royal family lost and that nothing can be done for them. He does not think the factious would negotiate.

On 6 October 1793, von Fersen paid a visit to Jean-Baptiste Drouet at the Saint-Elizabeth prison on the slim hope of hearing news that might be of use. Drouet was the postmaster who recognised Louis on his flight to Varennes and was able to alert the authorities in time to stop them.

Marie Antoinette was executed 10 days later. Von Fersen heard the news of this while in Brussels:

Though I was prepared for it and expected it since the transfer to the Conciergerie, I was devastated by the reality. I did not have the strength to feel anything ... I thought about her constantly, about all the horrible circumstances of her sufferings, of the doubt she might have had about me, my attachment, my interest. That thought tortured me.

=== Later years (1793–1810) ===
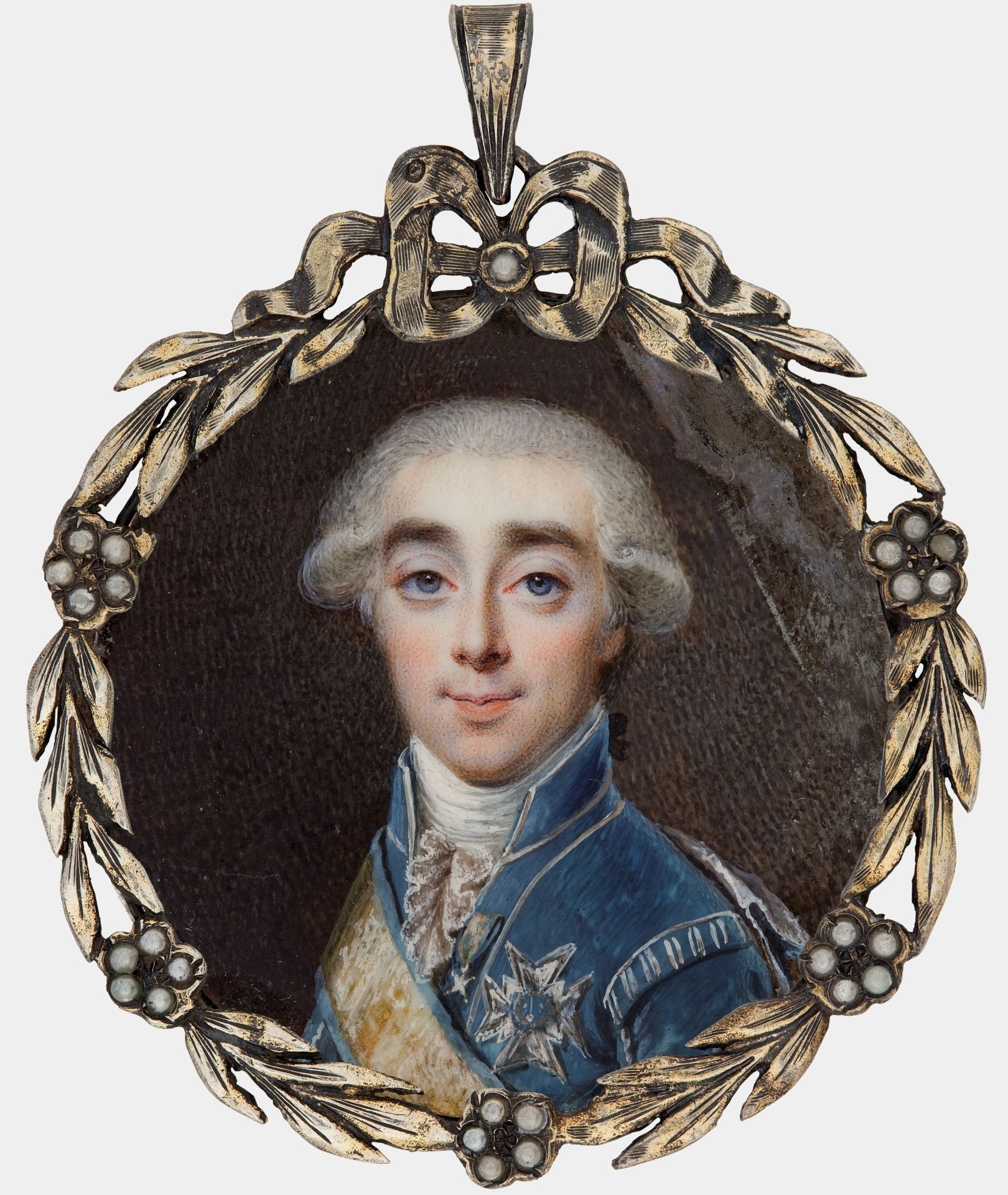
Axel von Fersen in the robes of the Royal Order of the Sword, miniature from 1798 by Niklas Lafrensen.

Von Fersen returned to Sweden in 1791. In the following years, he observed the ever-increasing expansion of the French revolutionary empire. In late December 1793, he was suspected of possible complicity in Baron Armfeldt's conspiracy to deprive the Duke of Södermanland of the regency. As a result, von Fersen was deprived of his diplomatic appointments and his post as ambassador. In November 1796, Prince Gustav was declared of age and become King Gustav IV Adolf. His accession restored von Fersen and other supporters of Gustav III to favour at court. Von Fersen and his best friend, Baron Taube, became two of the most influential advisers to the young king, inculcating in him a "steadfast opposition to Revolutionary France, close relations with Russia, and hostility to Denmark, with the ultimate objective of acquiring Norway".

In November 1797, von Fersen attended the Second Congress of Rastatt and met general Napoleon Bonaparte.

While in Germany, von Fersen made a trip to Karlsruhe to secure, for Gustav IV Adolf, the hand of the Princess Friederike of Baden, whom Gustav IV Adolf married in October. In 1799, following von Fersen's return to Sweden from Germany, he was appointed as one of the Lords of the Realm.

In the autumn of that year, Gustav IV Adolf became concerned about sympathy for the French Revolution in the city of Uppsala. After students at Uppsala University celebrated Bonaparte's return to France from his Italian campaigns, Gustav IV Adolf appointed von Fersen as Chancellor of the university. According to Adlerbeth, this amounted to "a declared French royalist being made the Swedish Jacobins' schoolmaster". That winter a wave of rioting occurred in Stockholm, Gothenburg, Norrköping, Linköping, Malmö, and other Swedish towns following the onset of a severe winter and famine. Von Fersen wrote: "Who, given the spirit that now prevails, can guarantee that there will not be a general upheaval?"

In April, an attempt to trick the Uppsala orchestra into performing a composition containing an excerpt from the "Marseillaise" led to the trial and punishment of four known university radicals, one of whom was dismissed. The "Music Trial" proved the deathblow to Uppsala radicalism.

With the government nearly bankrupt, and poor harvests and declining trade undermining his efforts to resolve the issue without recourse to parliament, Gustav IV Adolf reluctantly announced the first assembly of the Riksdag. The Riksdag dissolved in mid-June but not before several prominent aristocrats walked out and renounced their noble status. Though creating a much-talked about sensation, they had virtually left a vacuum in the political field which their rivals filled.

In 1801, von Fersen was appointed Marshal of the Realm. He was now the highest official in the court of Sweden. Around this time, von Fersen's sister, Sophie, returned to Sweden from Germany and took over his household in lieu of a wife.

=== Swedish politics and death ===
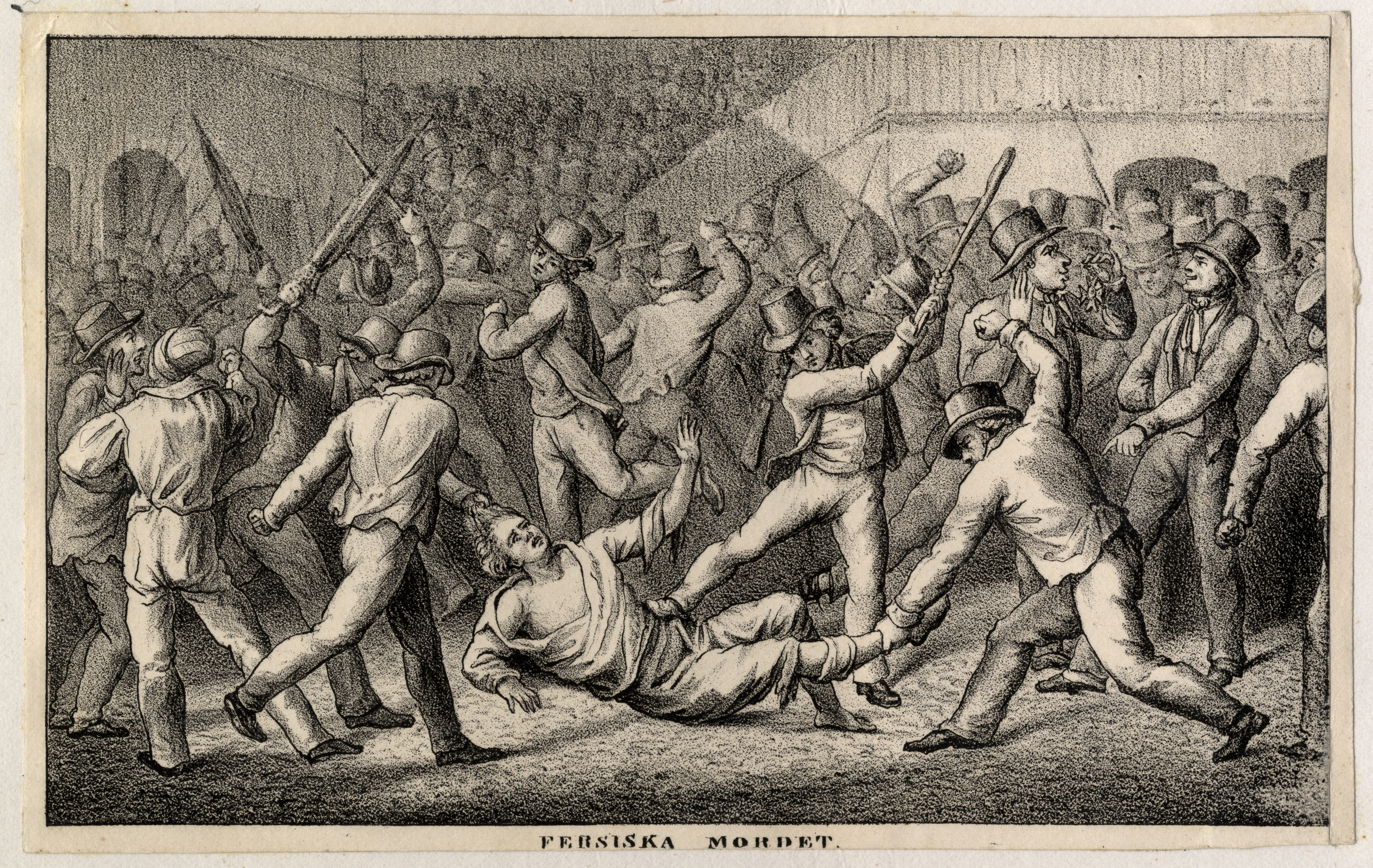
Von Fersen killed by the mob

Following the overthrow and exile of King Gustavus IV in 1809, a dispute over the royal succession divided the nobility and much of Swedish society. Von Fersen, now Earl Marshal of Sweden, was a prominent member of a political faction ("the Gustavians") which supported Gustavus' son against the popular Crown Prince Charles August.

On 28 May 1810, Charles August died, leading to unsubstantiated rumours that he had been poisoned, and that von Fersen and his sister Sophie were involved.

The Crown Prince's public funeral was held on 20 June 1810. The Livgardet till Häst (Horse Guards) formed the advance guard in the procession; von Fersen, as Marshal of the Realm, and other court dignitaries, rode in coaches before the coffin, while the rear of the procession was brought up by a squadron of cavalry which had accompanied the Crown Prince's remains from Scania. Foot Guards paraded on the Riddarhustorget. General Isaac Silfversparre, commander of the Stockholm garrison, was alerted to the possibility of disturbances but may himself have been a member of the court party that opposed von Fersen. The procession proceeded slowly through the Hornsgatan and Södermalm Square, and was met with threats and insults directed at von Fersen as soon as it entered the city.

First curses then copper coins and various missiles were hurled at the carriage till its windows were broken; then savage threats and showers of stones become continuous, and, at last in the Riddarhustorget, at the instant when the escort was turning to the right, a tremendous crowd barred the way of Fersen's carriage ... the [guards] remained passive while the rabble unharnessed the horses, and dragged Fersen out of the coach.

Von Fersen, with a violent effort, flung back one of the assailants who grasped him and shook himself free of the others who were pressing round. There was a momentary lull, and the curses shrank from shouts to mutterings. Von Fersen's face bled where a stone had cut it, his decorations glittering in the sun. The guards, who were supposed to protect him, gazed at him with a sort of curious expectancy.

It was at this moment when General Silfversparre arrived on the scene and a small detachment of troops. This intervention further enraged the large crowd. Von Fersen, realising that the authorities planned to do nothing, turned and dashed into the first door he could find. The crowd converged on this spot, and a few ran into the house in pursuit of him.

Before long, one man appeared at the window "and with a triumphant shout" hurled down von Fersen's cloak and sword, which were seized by the angry crowd. Von Fersen was dragged back out into the square. His gloves were pulled off and thrown in his face, and his coat torn off and trampled upon. Silfversparre, attempting to save von Fersen, offered to arrest him and have him tried in court for the Crown Prince's murder. At this moment, the mounted escort turned and rode away. Von Fersen succumbed on the scene.

Von Fersen's contemporary, Baron Gustaf Armfelt, stated afterward:

One is almost tempted to say that the government wanted to give the people a victim to play with, just as when one throws something to an irritated wild beast to distract its attention. The more I consider it all, the more I am certain that the mob had the least to do with it ... But in God's name what were the troops about? How could such a thing happen in broad daylight during a procession, when troops and a military escort were actually present?

Axel von Fersen died that day in Stockholm as Sweden's highest-ranking official next to the king; his death sent shockwaves throughout the country. The cause of death was determined to be "crushing of the ribcage" when the Swedish-Finn Otto Johan Tandefelt jumped with both feet on von Fersen's chest.

== Aftermath ==
A few months after the murder, von Fersen and his family were cleared of any suspicion connected with the death of Carl August of Augustenburg, and he finally received a state burial with all pomp and ceremony. His sister, Sophie Piper, withdrew from Stockholm to her Löfstad manor, near Norrköping. Here she raised a memorial to her brother, with the inscription:

Åt en oförgätlig broder, mannamodet uti hans sista stunder den 20 juni 1810 vittna om hans dygder och sinnes lugn and I dessa neider där han fordom niutit wänskapen och friden skall hans skugga mötas af wälsignelse och tårar. (English: To an unforgettable brother, the courage in his last moments on 20 June 1810, bears testimony to his virtues and clean conscience. In these parts where before he has enjoyed friendship and serenity shall his spirit be met by blessings and tears.)

== Relationship with Marie Antoinette ==
The young nobleman was a favourite at the French court, owing partly to the recollection of his father's devotion to France, but principally because of his own amiable qualities. Queen Marie Antoinette, who had first met von Fersen when they both were 18, was especially attracted by the grace and wit of "le beau" von Fersen. However, it was nearly four years later, on von Fersen's second visit to France in the summer of 1778, when the relationship blossomed.

There he was accepted by Marie Antoinette into her trusted circle and invited to her private gatherings at the Petit Trianon. It seems that the friendship grew very quickly and caused jealousy among those at court. In Beaumont's account, von Fersen left for the war in America in the early part of 1780 to avoid causing a scandal, as it was widely known that the two were close, and it was rumoured that he was Antoinette's lover. Beaumont wrote in his memoirs that von Fersen asked Swedish minister to France Gustaf Philip Creutz to use his influence to get him appointed as aide-de-camp to Rochambeau. According to Creutz in a letter to Gustav III:

The young Count Fersen has been so well received by the queen that this has given umbrage to several persons. I own that I cannot help thinking that she had a liking for him; I have seen too many indications to doubt it. The conduct of the young count has been admirable on this occasion for its modesty and reserve, but above all, in the decision he made to go to America. By thus departing he avoided all dangers; but it needed, evidently, a firmness beyond his years, to surmount that seduction. The queen's eyes could not leave him, during the last days, and they often filled with tears.

After his return from America in June 1783, he was again accepted into Antoinette's private society. There were again rumours that they were romantically involved. But since most of their correspondence was lost, destroyed, or redacted, there was no conclusive evidence. Starting in 2016, scientists at France's Research Centre for the Conservation of Collections (CRCC) uncovered some of the redacted text of Antoinette's letters to von Fersen. The revealed texts do not mention a physical relationship, but do confirm a very strong emotional relationship.

== In popular culture ==
In the 1938 American feature film Marie Antoinette, matinée idol Tyrone Power portrays von Fersen.

In the 2006 drama/romance Marie Antoinette, he is portrayed by Jamie Dornan.

In 2022 television miniseries Marie Antoinette, he is played by Martijn Lakemeier.

Von Fersen is a significant character in the Japanese manga series The Rose of Versailles by Riyoko Ikeda and its adaptations.

He is also mentioned in The Bane Chronicles, a novella series associated with Cassandra Clare's Shadowhunter franchise.

== Sources ==
- Barton, Hildor Arnold (1986). Scandinavia in the Revolutionary Era: 1760 - 1815. University of Minnesota Press. ISBN 978-0-8166-1392-2.
- Fraser, Antonia (2001). Marie Antoinette (1st ed.). New York: N.A. Talese/Doubleday. ISBN 978-0-385-48948-5.
- Lamballe, Marie Thérèse Louise de Savoie Carignan (1901). Secret Memoirs of Princess Lamballe: Being Her Journals, Letters and Conversations During Her Confidential Relations with Marie Antoinette ... M. Walter Dunne.
- von Fersen, Hans Axel (1902). Diary and Correspondence of Count Axel Fersen: Grand-marshal of Sweden, Relating to the Court of France. Wormeley, Katherine Prescott (Translator). Heinemann.
- Wraxall, Sir Lascelles (1863). Remarkable Adventurers and Unrevealed Mysteries. Richard Bentley.
