= Lorens Pasch the Younger =

Swedish painter (1733–1805)

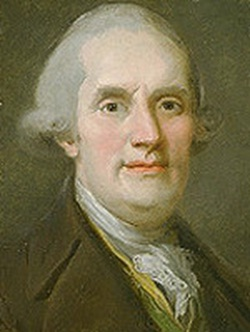
Self-portrait, 18th century

Lorens or Lorenz Pasch the Younger (1733–1805) was a Swedish painter.

== Life ==
He grew up in an artistic family (he was the brother of Ulrika Pasch, alongside whom he was elected to the Art Academy in 1773), but his father Lorens Pasch the Elder wanted him to become a priest. He was thus sent to study in Uppsala aged 10. However, he decided on an artistic career after all and began an apprenticeship in his father's studio before going to Copenhagen, with introductions from his wealthy and influential uncle Johan Pasch. There he studied painting for three years in the studio of Carl Gustaf Pilo. Despite good offers of studio-apprenticeships and commissions from Sweden, he then set off for Paris in 1758 to complete his artistic education. There he specialised in history painting in the studios of Eustache Le Sueur and François Boucher (though for financial reasons he also continued his training in portraiture) and became friends with fellow-Swede Alexander Roslin.

In 1764 he left Paris and got back to Sweden in 1766. He fully completed his training in the studio of the French painter Guillaume Taraval, who in 1735 founded the Royal Swedish Academy of Arts in Stockholm. Soon after his arrival back in Sweden Pasch's gained a great reputation as a portraitist, gaining favour and commissions from the royal court and gaining the esteem of Adolf Frederick, King of Sweden and his queen Louisa Ulrika - one of his most notable works is his Portrait of Louisa Ulrika of Prussia. He served as a professor at the Academy of Arts from 1773 to his death, becoming its director on Pilo's death in 1793. At the end of his life he concentrated more on training young artists and managing the academy than on painting. He died unmarried in 1805 and due to his powerful portraits remains one of the most respected painters of the Gustavian era in Sweden.

== Gallery ==
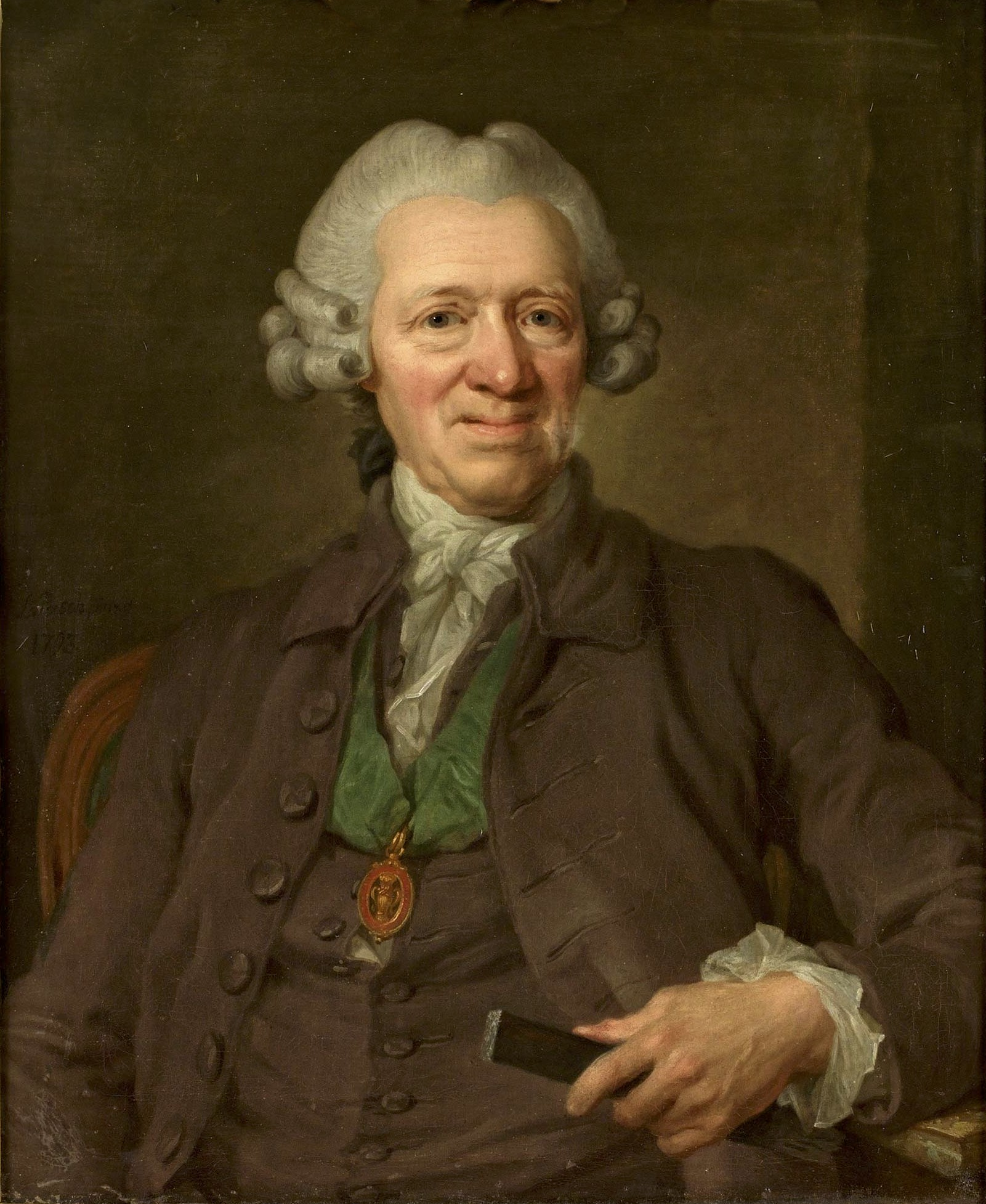
Jacob Ramsell

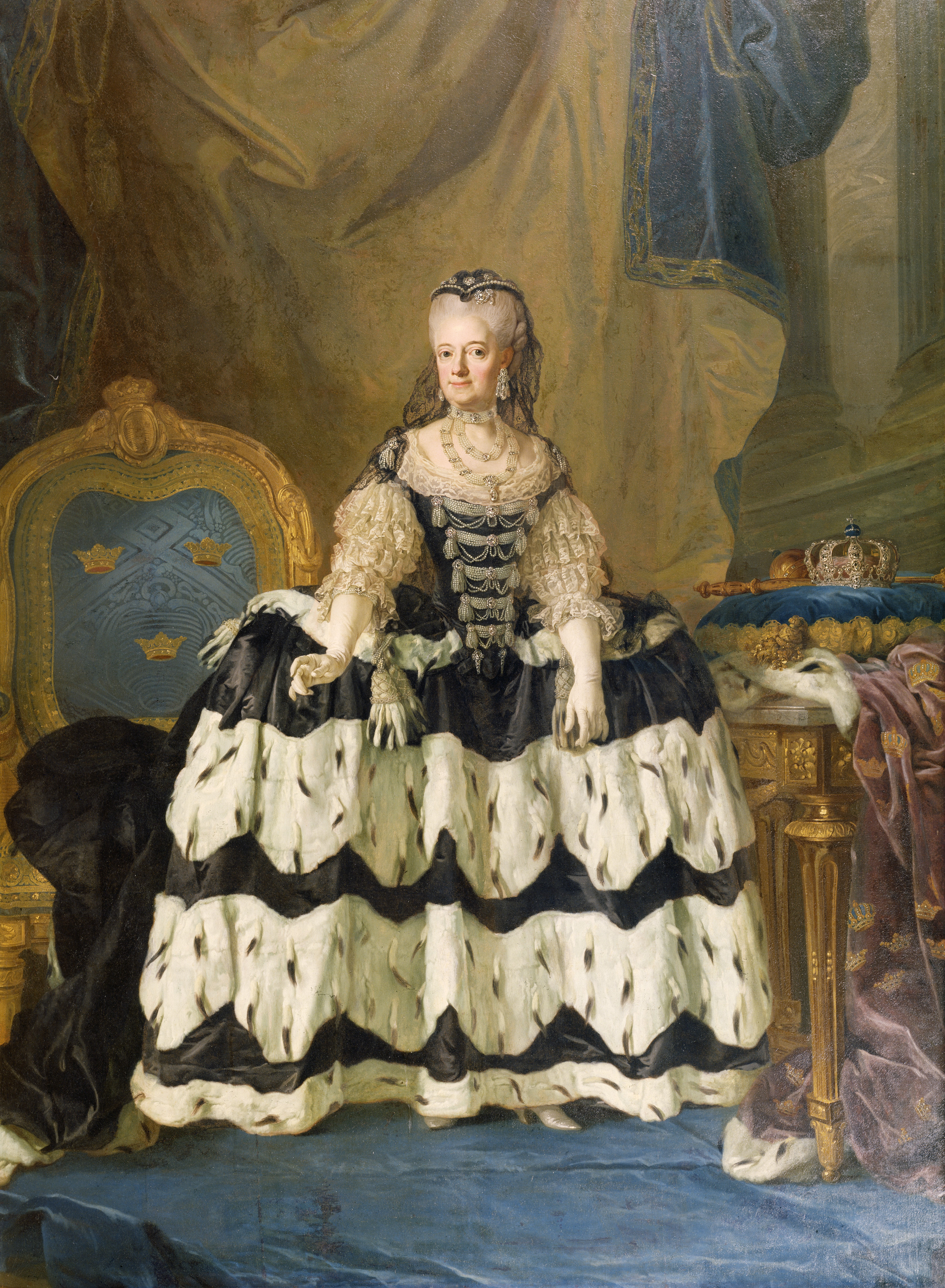
Queen Luise Ulrike, nach 1771

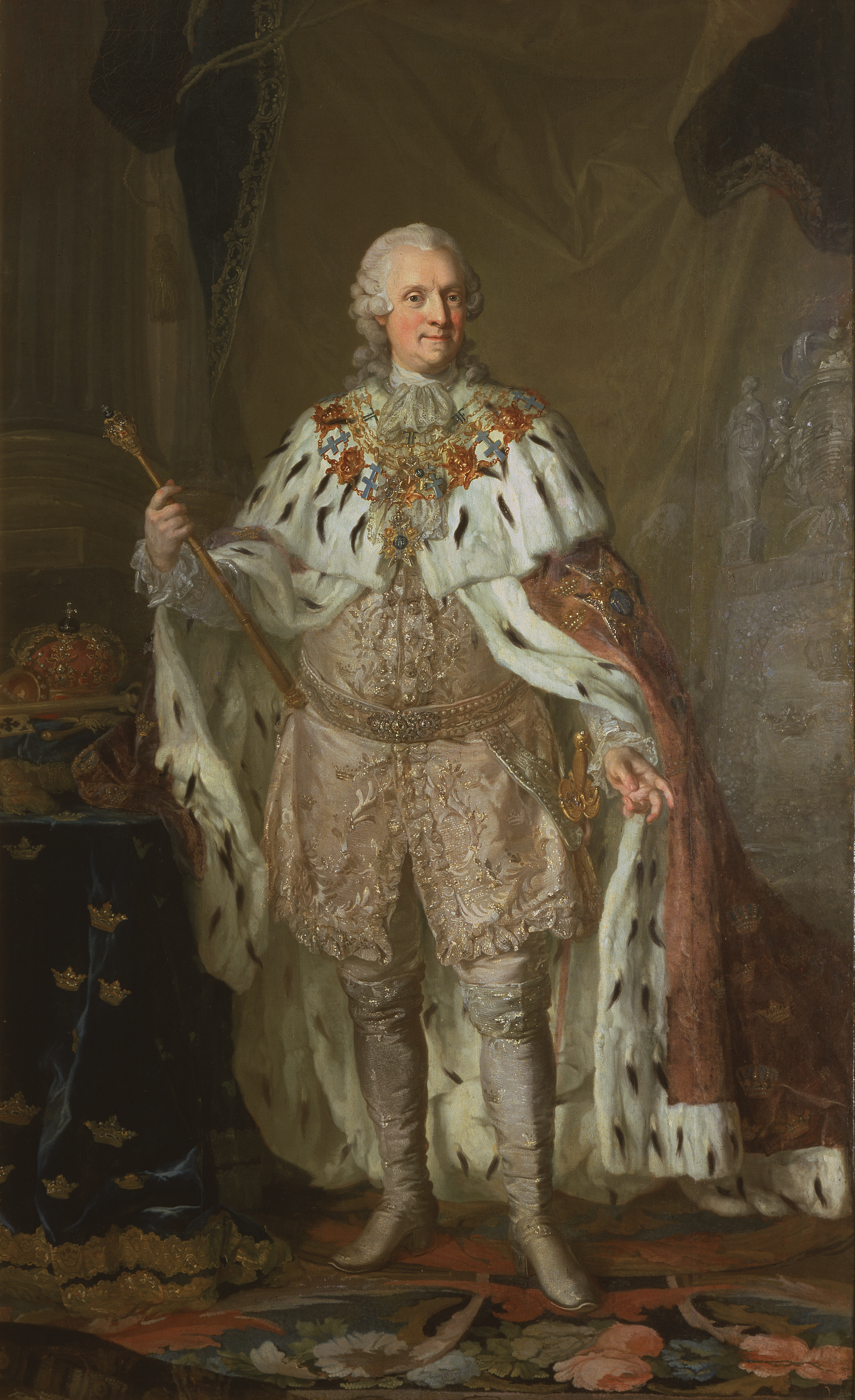
King Adolf Friedrich of Sweden

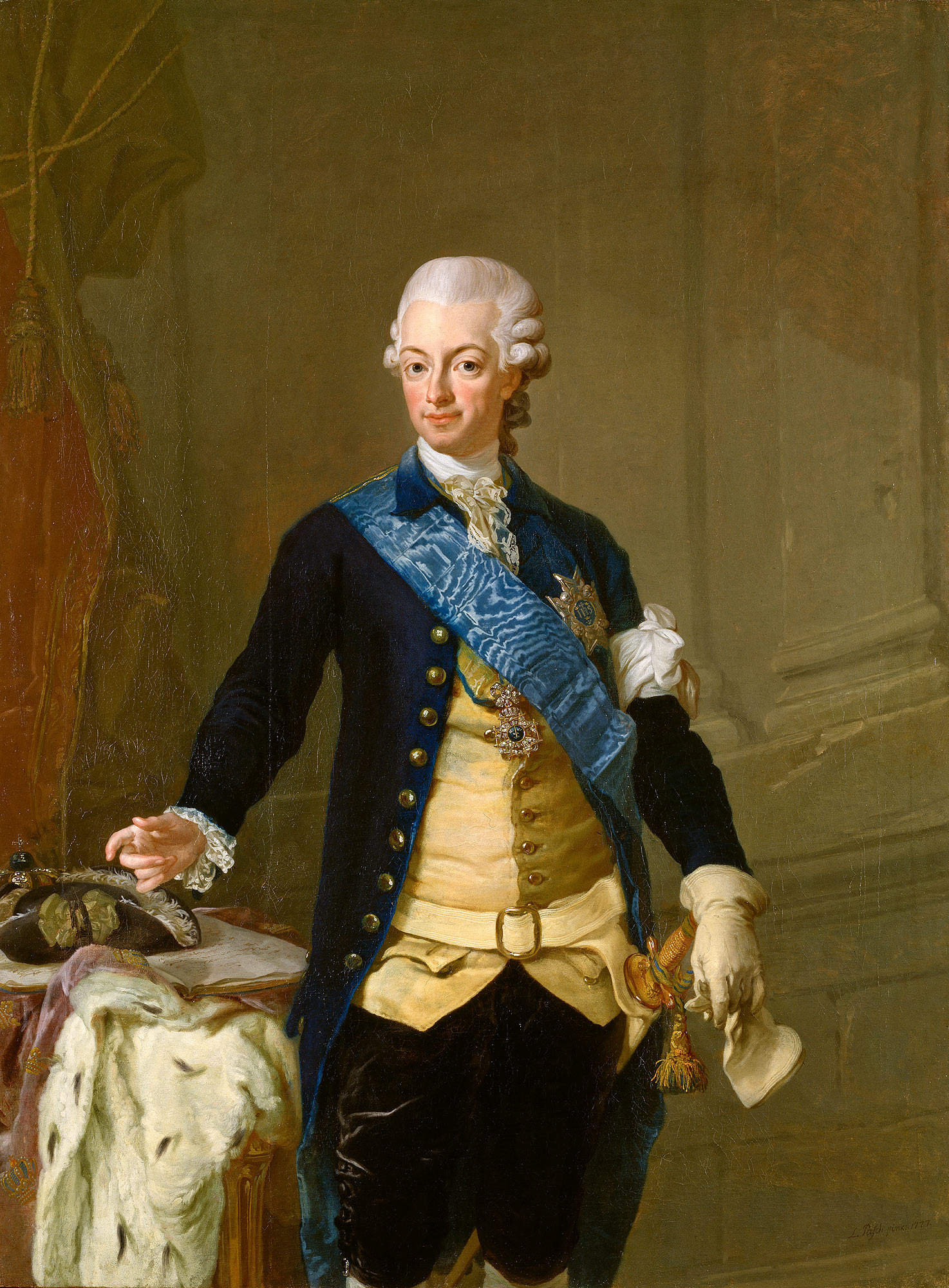
King Gustav III of Sweden, 1777

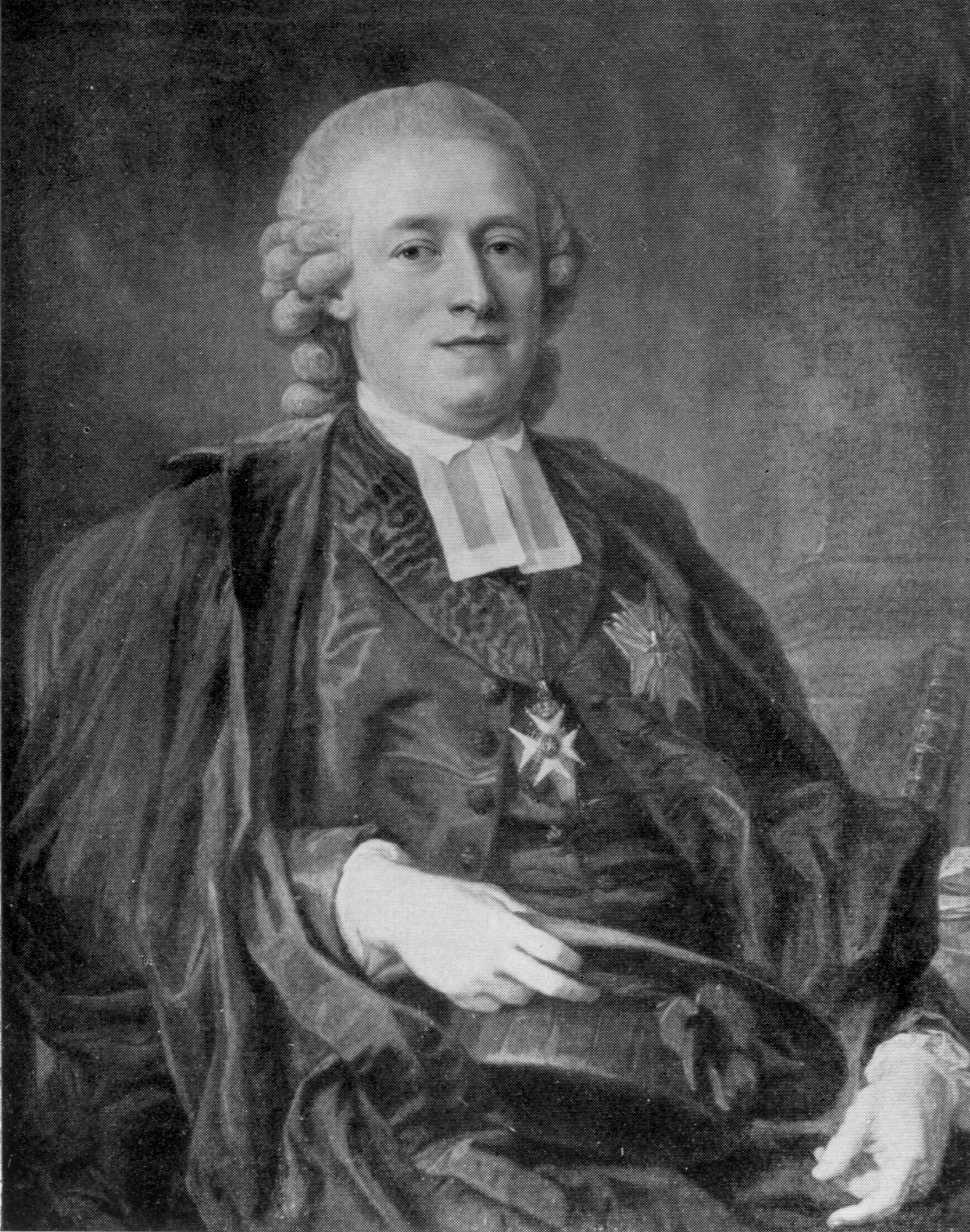
Bishop Uno von Troil

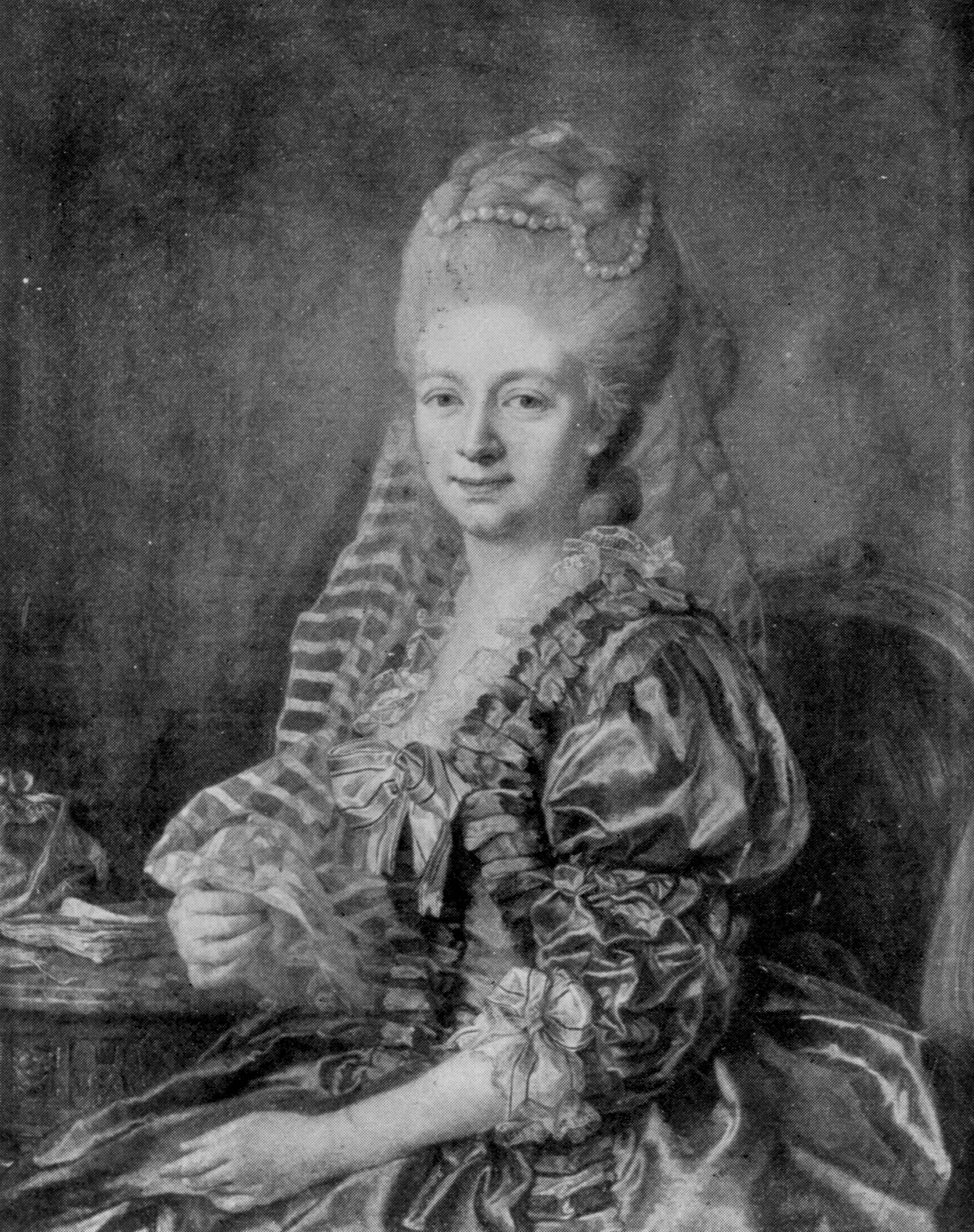
Magdalena von Troil

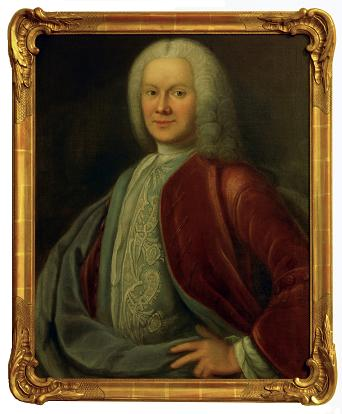
Nils Rosén von Rosenstein

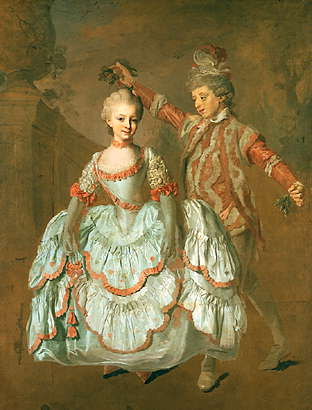
Dancing children

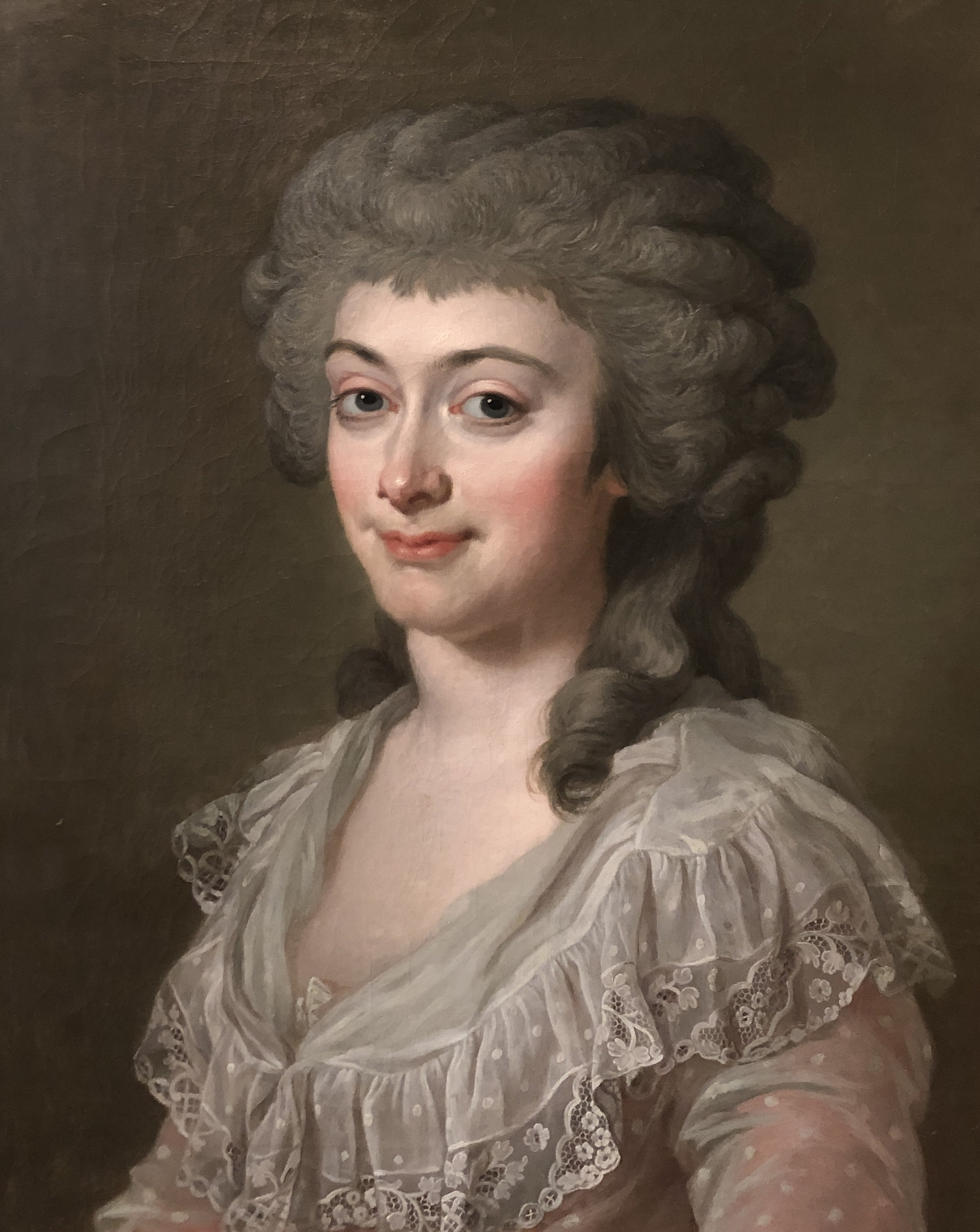
Hedvig Eleonora Klinckowström

== Sources ==
- (in Swedish) Strömbom, Sixten: Lorens Pasch d.y. Norstedt och söners förlag, 1915.
- (in Swedish) Entry in the Svenskt biografiskt handlexikon (1906)
- Wahlberg, A. G. (2003). "Pasch, Lorens [Lorentz]". Grove Art Online.
