= Greb =

Greb is a surname. Notable people with the surname include:

- Benny Greb (born 1980), prolific German drummer, singer, and clinician
- Charles Greb (1859–1934), Canadian business owner and politician
- Christin Carmichael Greb (born 1980), Canadian business owner and politician
- Gordon Greb (1921–2016), emeritus professor
- Harry Greb (1894–1926), American professional boxer
- Max Greb (born 1992), American YouTuber and chef also known as Max the Meat Guy
- Harry Greb (1915-1998), Canadian Business owner
- Ruth Greb (born 1993), German politician

== See also ==
- Franz Xaver Bergmann (1861–1936), Austrian artist who used the sign "Nam Greb"
- Grebo (disambiguation)
