= Ulrika Pasch =

Swedish painter (1735–1796)

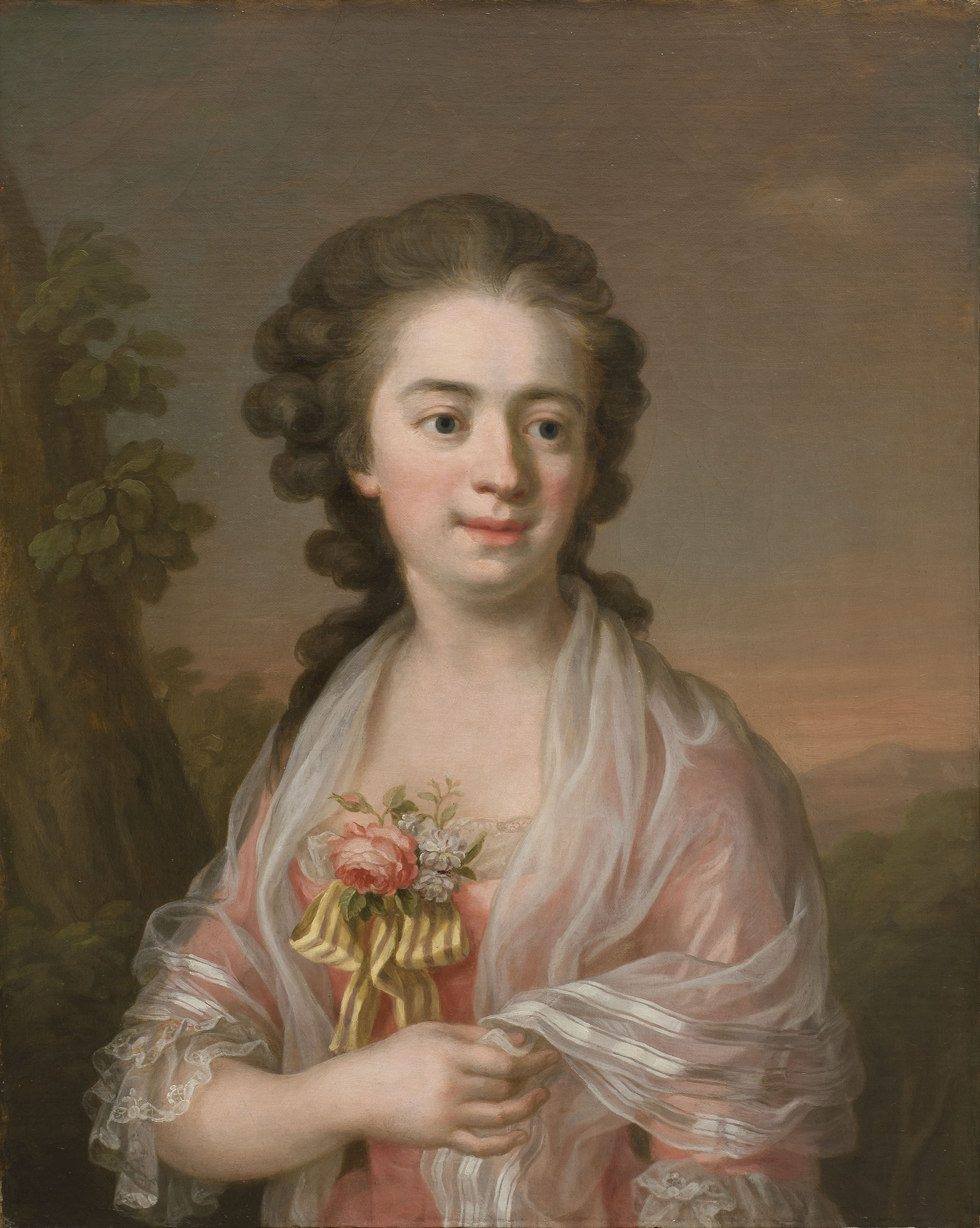
- Self-portrait, c. 1770
- Born: Ulrika Fredrica Pasch; 10 July 1735; Stockholm, Sweden
- Died: 2 April 1796 (aged 60); Stockholm, Sweden
- Known for: Painting
- Movement: Rococo

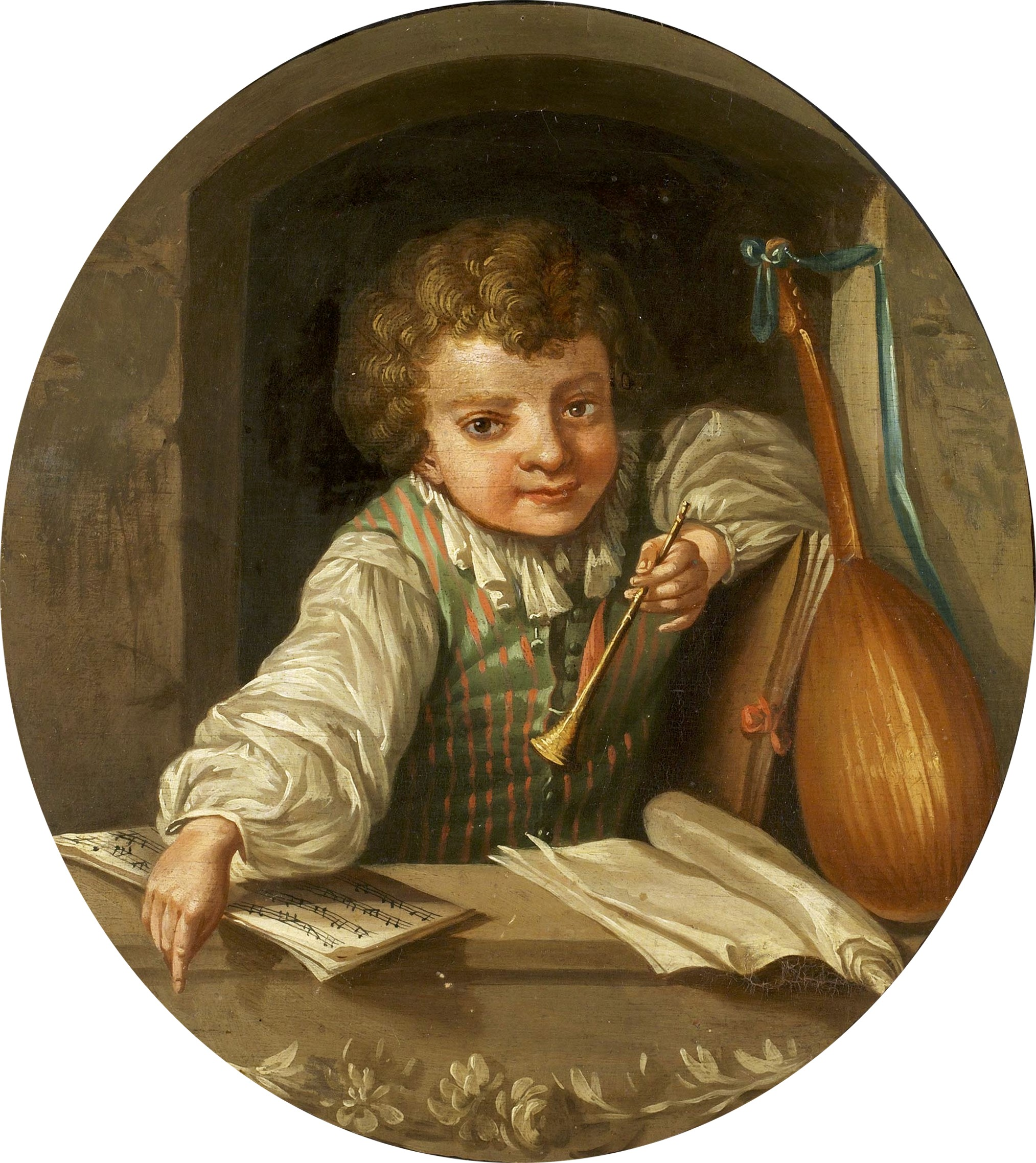
Boy with a flute

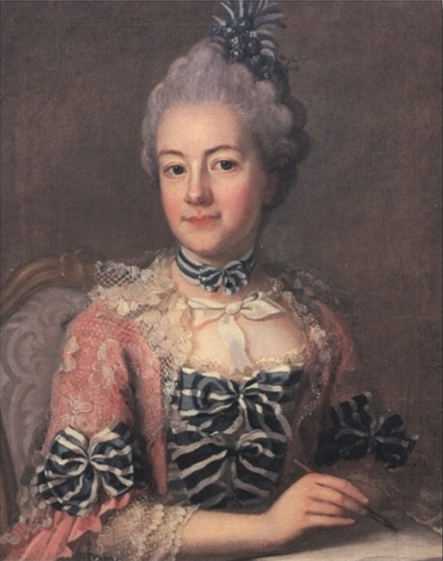
Hedvig Charlotta Nordenflycht

Ulrika "Ulla" Fredrica Pasch (10 July 1735 – 2 April 1796), was a Swedish rococo painter and miniaturist, and a member of the Royal Swedish Academy of Arts.

== Biography ==
=== Education and early career ===
Ulrika Pasch was the daughter of the painter Lorens Pasch the Elder and Anna Helena Beckman, the niece of the artist Johan Pasch, and the sister of the future painter Lorens Pasch the Younger. Her grandfather, the painter Danckwart Pasch (d. 1727), had emigrated to Sweden from Lübeck. After the death of her grandfather in 1727, the family studio had been managed by her paternal grandmother Judith Larsdotter until it was taken over by her paternal uncle, Johan Pasch, in 1734. Her cousin, Margareta Stafhell, was a Chalcography artist.

Ulrika Pasch and her brother was tutored in drawing and painting by their father. She, unlike her sister Hedvig Lovisa Pasch (1744-1796) was tutored explicitly because she displayed early talent for the work. Hedvig Lovisa never became an artist, though it is mentioned that she left som drawings which were not without talent. From 1752 until 1766, her brother studied art abroad. During this period, her father's career declined, because he had failed to adapt to the new rococo style. Consequently, the family experienced economical difficulties. Ulrika Pasch was therefore, after the death of her mother in 1756, employed as a housekeeper in the house of her maternal aunt's widower, the goldsmith Gustaf Stafhell the Elder.

Her uncle, however, allowed her to paint in her free time and develop her artistic talent, and she started to paint and draw for money. It is explicitly stated that she started to take orders as an artist the same year that she year formally became a housekeeper. Soon, she was able to support both her father and her sister as a professional portrait painter. Reportedly, she managed to achieve this success and build up a clientele quickly by her affordable prices. She was able to move into her own apartments and establish her own studio. By the time of her brother's return to Sweden in 1766, she was said to have supported the family for a period of ten years.

=== Career ===
In 1766, her brother Lorens Pasch the Younger returned to Stockholm, and from that point on, the two siblings worked together. Their collaboration has been described as one of mutual respect and harmony. They shared their studio and guided each other in their work, while their sister Hedvig Lovisa managed their household. Hedvig Lovisa has been described as their dutiful housekeeper, and it is hinted and alleged by contemporaries that Hedvig Lovisa actually committed suicide after the death of her sister in 1796: she died later the same year.

Ulrika Pasch is known to have painted details in her brother's painting which he himself found tiring, especially details in textiles and clothing. Pasch had an active and successful career until her death, and was frequently hired by members of the royal court and aristocracy.

As a person, Ulrika Pasch has been described as a humble character, who never claimed her work to be anything but a way of supporting herself. She is also described as an easygoing and humorous person, who was easy to be around and could adapt to every situation.

=== Royal Swedish Academy of Arts ===
The Royal Swedish Academy of Arts was founded in 1773 and there were 15 members accepted by the academy that year. Pasch was the only female who was made a member that year a recognition which seem to have been considered to be well deserved within the academy.

She was made a member at the same occasion as her brother. Unlike her male counterparts, however, she never received a pension from the crown despite repeated appeals.

She participated in the exhibitions of the academy, most notably in 1794.

In 1798, Thure Wennberg held her memorial speech, Minne af Ulrica Fredria Pasch (Memory of Ulrica Fredria Pasch).

Ulrika Pasch is the most famous and successful female artist in Sweden and perhaps also the rest of Scandinavia (among artists who actually worked in these countries) before the 19th century.

=== Works ===
- Captain Carl Adolf Möllersvärd, 1775, oil on canvas, Finnish National Gallery
- Catharina Charlotta L'Estrade, 1780, oil on canvas, Finnish National Gallery
- Hedvig Ulrika Hedengran, 1772, oil on canvas, Finnish National Gallery
- Portrait of a Lady, oil on canvas, Finnish National Gallery
- Portrait of Carl Johan von Schultzenheim, 1776, oil on canvas, Finnish National Gallery

== In fiction ==
Ulrika Pasch is portrayed in the novel Pottungen (Chamber pot child) by Anna Laestadius Larsson from 2014, where she, alongside Anna Maria Lenngren, Ulrika Widström, Jeanna von Lantingshausen, Marianne Ehrenström and Sophie von Fersen, becomes a member in a Blue Stockings Society organized by Hedvig Elisabeth Charlotte of Holstein-Gottorp, and the fictitious Rower woman Johanna is hired as a nude model by her.

== See also ==
- Women artists

== Sources ==
- Svenskt konstnärslexikon [Swedish Art dictionary] (in Swedish). Malmö: Allhems Förlag. 1952.
