= Johan Stålbom =

Johan Stalbom
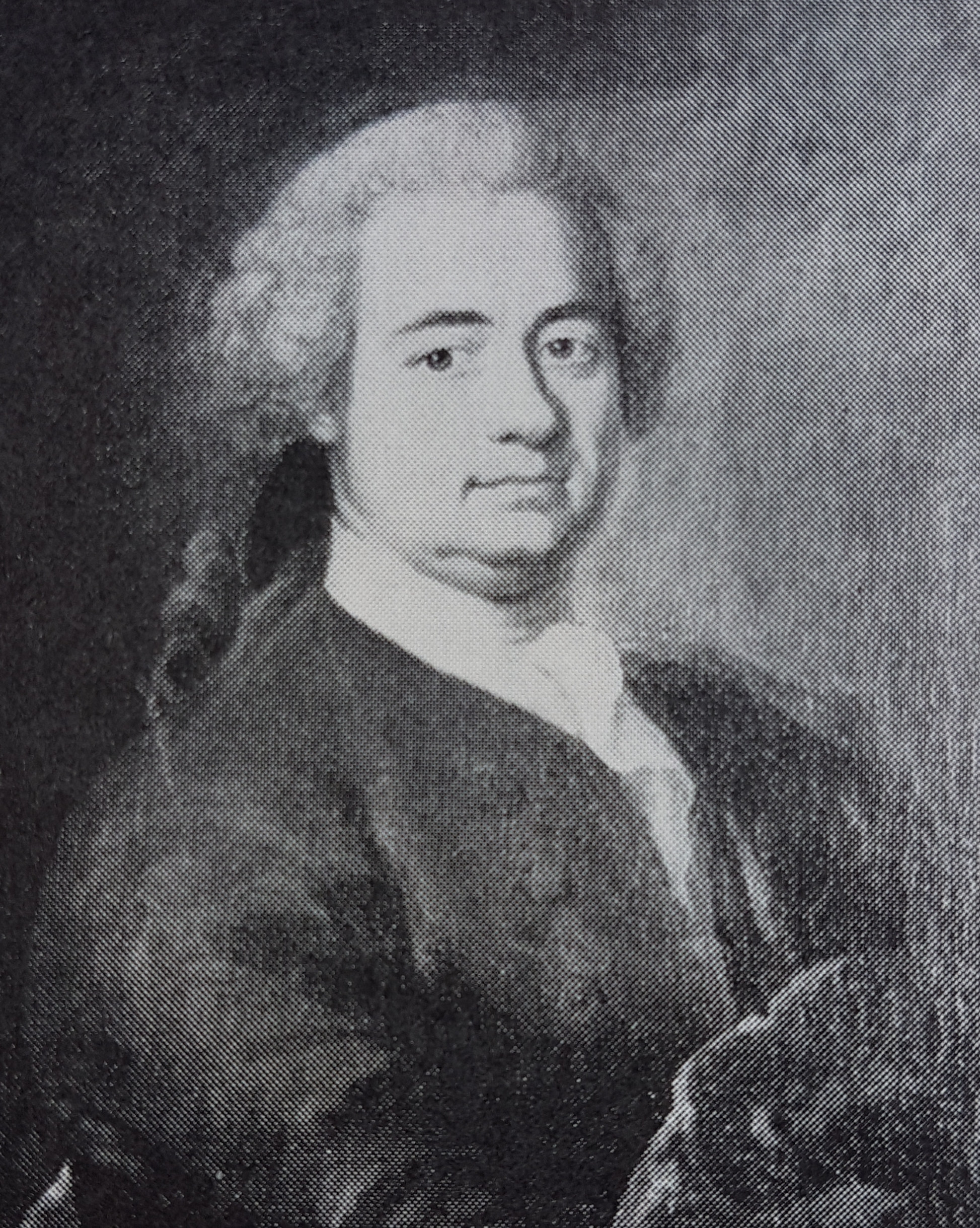
- Born: 1712; Karis, Sweden
- Died: 17 November 1777 (aged 64–65); Grebo, Östergötland, Sweden

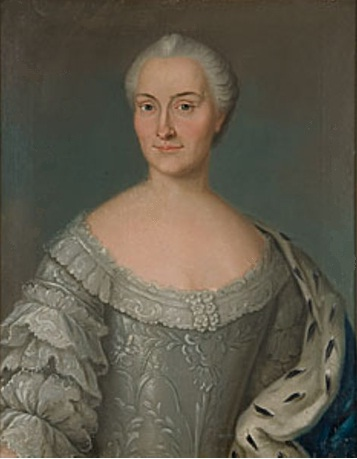
Portrait of a Lady by Johan Stålbom, 1752

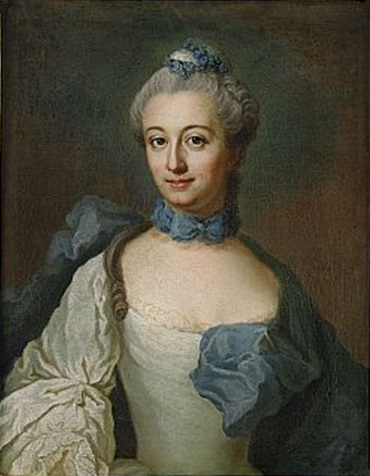
Fredrika Ulrika Staël von Holstein painted by Johan Stålbom 1766

Johan Stålbom (1712 – 17 November 1777) was a Swedish painter.

Stålbom was born in the former town of Karis (now Raseborg), Finland. He studied from 1733 with the painters Johan Pasch and Lorens Pasch the Elder in Stockholm. From the 1740s, he worked and lived mainly in Östergötland, later in his estate Orräng in Grebo, Sweden.

Stålbom primarily painted portraits. The Linköping Diocese library shows a few portraits he has painted. There are only a few of his works that have survived. In the best of his works is displayed skillful drawing, and strong, but not sophisticated colors. His colorings are characterized by a strong reddish color and a greenish or grayish shading.

Johan Stålbom married around 1757 with Susanna Beata Hammardahl. Stålbom died at Grebo in Östergötland, Sweden.

== Other sources ==
- Roosval, Johnny, Lilja, Gösta & Andersson, Knut (red). Svenskt konstnärslexikon(1952-1967). Malmö.
- Boo von Malmborg, Svensk porträttkonst under fem århundraden, Allhems Förlag 1978.
