= Grebo =

Grebo may refer to:

- Grebo people, an ethnic group or subgroup within the larger Kru group of West Africa
  - Grebo language, their language
- Grebo languages, a dialect cluster of the Kru languages
- Grebo (music), a United Kingdom subculture of the late 1980s and early 1990s
- Grebo IK, a football club in Sweden
- Grebo, Sweden, a locality in Östergötland County
- Zdravko Grebo (1947–2019), professor of law at the University of Sarajevo

== See also ==
- Greb
