= Lorens Pasch the Elder =

Swedish portrait painter (1702–1766)

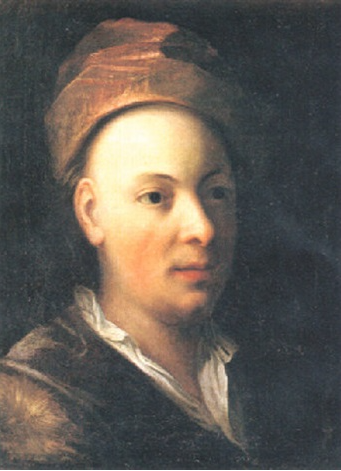
Self-portrait

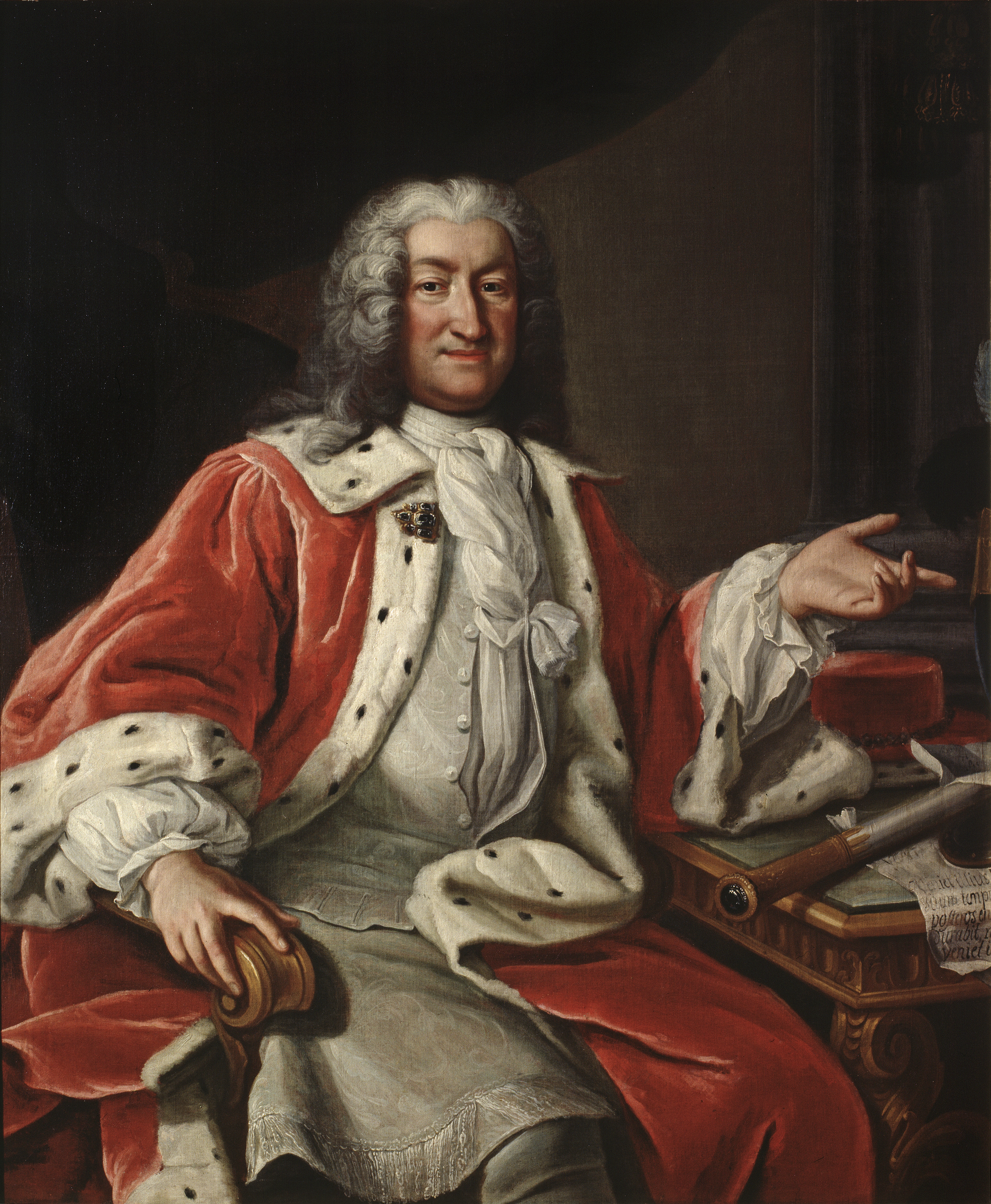
Portrait of Arvid Horn

Lorens Pasch the Elder, sometimes spelled Lorentz or Lorenz (March 1702, Stockholm – 27 April 1766, Stockholm) was a Swedish portrait painter.

== Biography ==
His father was the decorative painter and village Elder, Danckwardt Pasch (1660-1727), who originally came from Lübeck. His brothers, Danckwardt Pasch the Younger (1690-1759) and Johan Pasch also became painters, as did his children, Lorens Pasch the Younger and Ulrika Pasch.

He originally studied decorative painting with his father. In 1714, he became a student of David von Krafft and, in 1721, went to London, which was then attracting many Scandinavian artists. There, he was introduced to the art community by his fellow Swedes, Michael Dahl and Hans Hysing. He was one of the last students of the German-born painter, Godfrey Kneller, who was by then a British citizen. He returned to Stockholm in 1728, after his father's death, due to disputes involving inheritance.

Two years later, he married Anna Helena Beckman (1706-1756), the daughter of a local official. They settled into a home in the Norrmalm district. He soon became one of Stockholm's most reputable portrait painters. Much of his work shows the influence of William Hogarth, although he is also credited with helping to introduce the Rococo style into Sweden.

In the 1740s, his reputation began to fade, styles changed, and other portraitists became more favored, so he reluctantly began to produce paintings quickly at low prices. During this time, he trained his children as artists and may have taught others as well including, possibly, Johan Stålbom and Johan Joachim Streng. He became ill in his final years and was nursed by his daughter until his death in 1766.

Many of his most notable portraits are on display at the Nationalmuseum.

== Other Sources ==
- Svensk uppslagsbok. Malmö 1931.
