= Nicolas-René Jollain =

French painter (1732–1804)

- Born: 1732; Paris, France
- Died: 1804 (aged 71–72); Paris, France
- Education: Académie royale de peinture et de sculpture
- Occupation: Painter

Nicolas-René Jollain (French pronunciation: [nikɔla ʁəne ʒɔlɛ̃]; 1732 – 1804) was a French painter. He was a student of Jean-Baptiste Marie Pierre at the Académie royale de peinture et de sculpture.

== Work ==
Year	Image	Title	Location	Ref.
1765		Danaë	Private collection	
1768		Apollon pleurant Hyacinthe ou Hyacinthe changée en fleur	Palace of Versailles	
1768		Clytie changée en tournesol	Palace of Versailles	
1769		Le refuge		
1771		Jupiter sous la forme de Diane séduit Calisto	Private collection	
1781		Jésus au milieu des Docteurs	Palace of Fontainebleau	
