= Jean-Baptiste Marie Pierre =

French painter

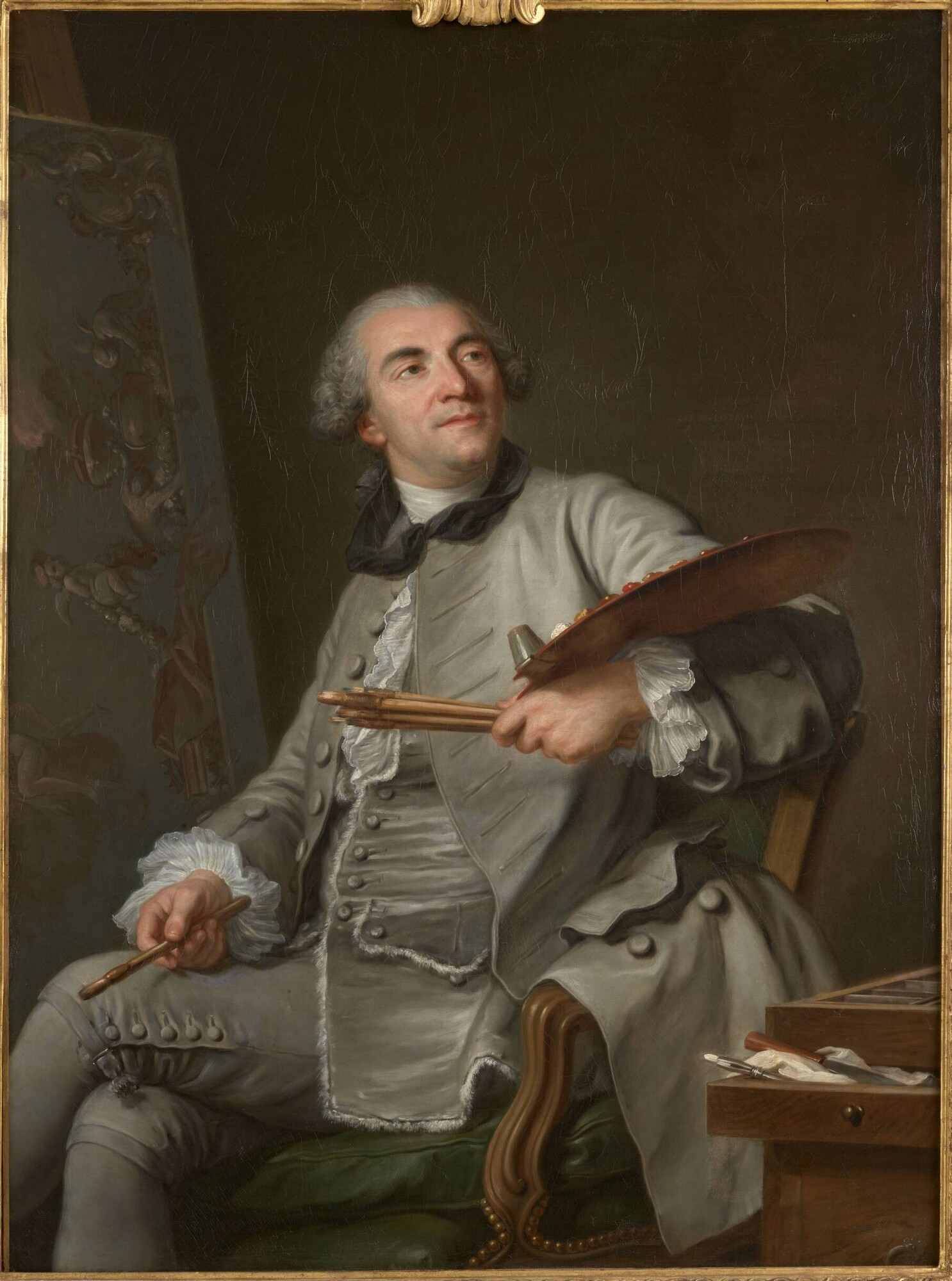
- Portrait of Jean-Baptiste Marie Pierre by Guillaume Voiriot
- Born: 6 March 1714
- Died: 15 May 1789 (aged 75)
- Known for: Painting, Drawing, Administrator

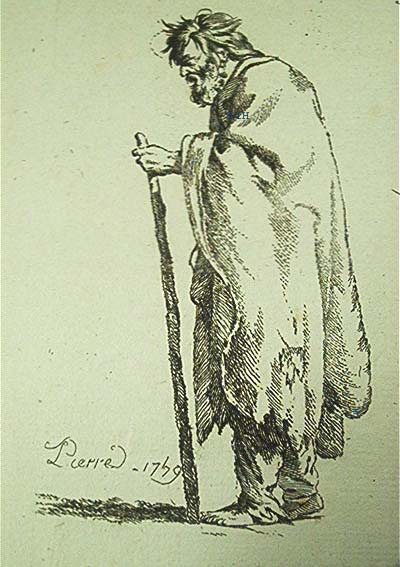
Vieillard (1739). Etching by Jean-Baptiste Marie Pierre from a series entitled Figures drawn from nature from the lower classes of Rome.

Jean-Baptiste Marie Pierre (6 March 1714 – 15 May 1789) was a French painter, draughtsman and administrator.

== Life ==
He was a student of Charles-Joseph Natoire at the Académie royale de peinture et de sculpture and painted a self-portrait in 1732. From 1770 to 1789 he was Premier peintre du Roi.

Jean-Baptiste Marie Pierre's students included Étienne-Louis Boullée, Louis-Jacques Durameau, Nicolas-René Jollain, Friedrich Reclam, Étienne de La Vallée Poussin, Jean-Jacques-François Le Barbier, Antoine Vestier, Jean-Baptiste Tierce, and Hughes Taraval.

== Misogyny ==
Élisabeth Vigée Le Brun wrote in her memoirs:

After my return from Flanders [circa 1782], the Self-portrait in a Straw Hat and several other works of mine, were the cause of Joseph Vernet's decision to propose me as a member of the Académie royale de peinture et de sculpture. Monsieur Pierre, then Premier peintre du Roi (first Painter to the King), made strong opposition, not wishing, he said, that women should be admitted. ... Monsieur Pierre, a very mediocre painter, was a clever man. Besides, he was rich, ... His opposition might have become fatal to me if all true picture-lovers had not been associated with the Academy, and if they had not formed a cabal, in my favour, against M. Pierre's. At last I was admitted ...

== Gallery ==
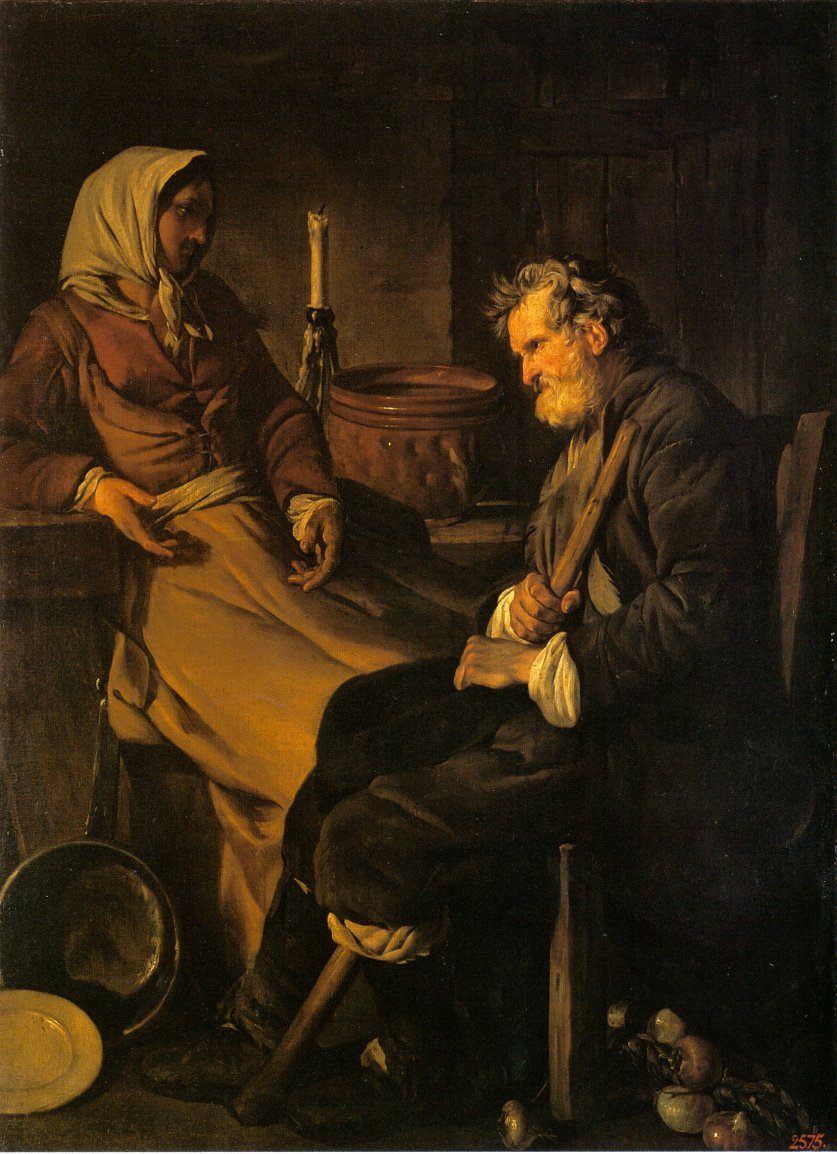
Old man in a kitchen (c. 1745)
Winter Palace, Saint Petersburg.

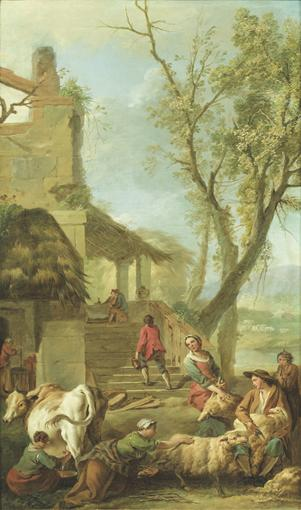
The Seasons (1749)
Musée historique lorrain, Nancy.

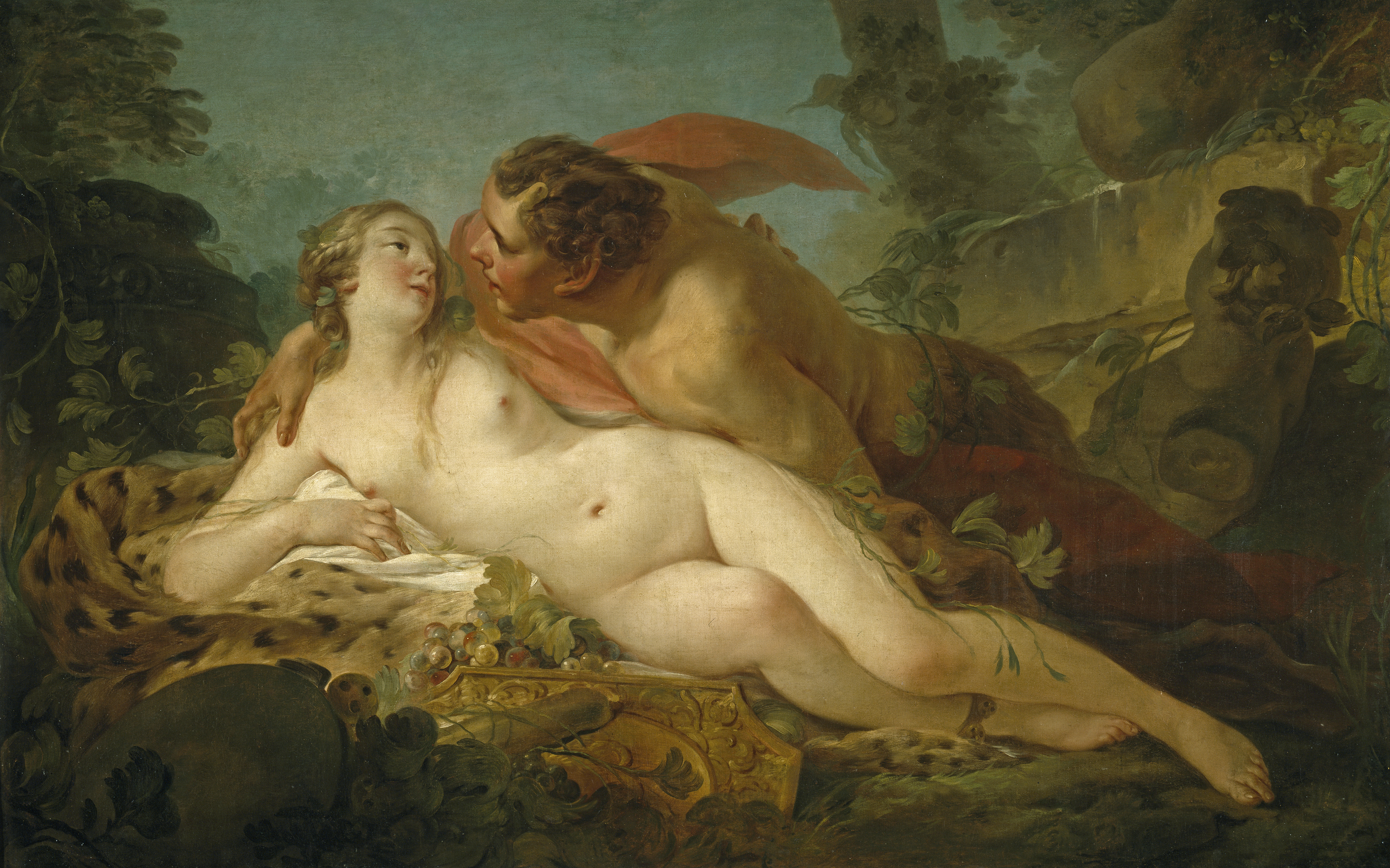
Jupiter and Antiope
Prado, Madrid.

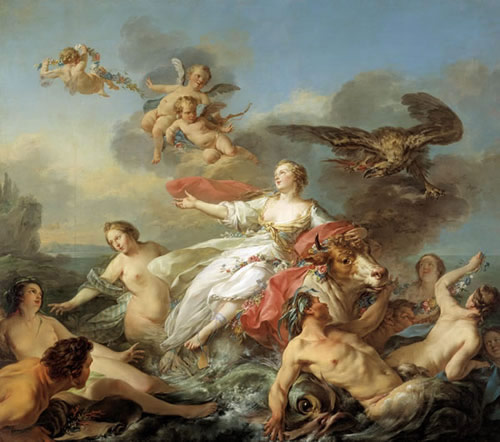
The Rape of Europa (1750)
Dallas Museum of Art.

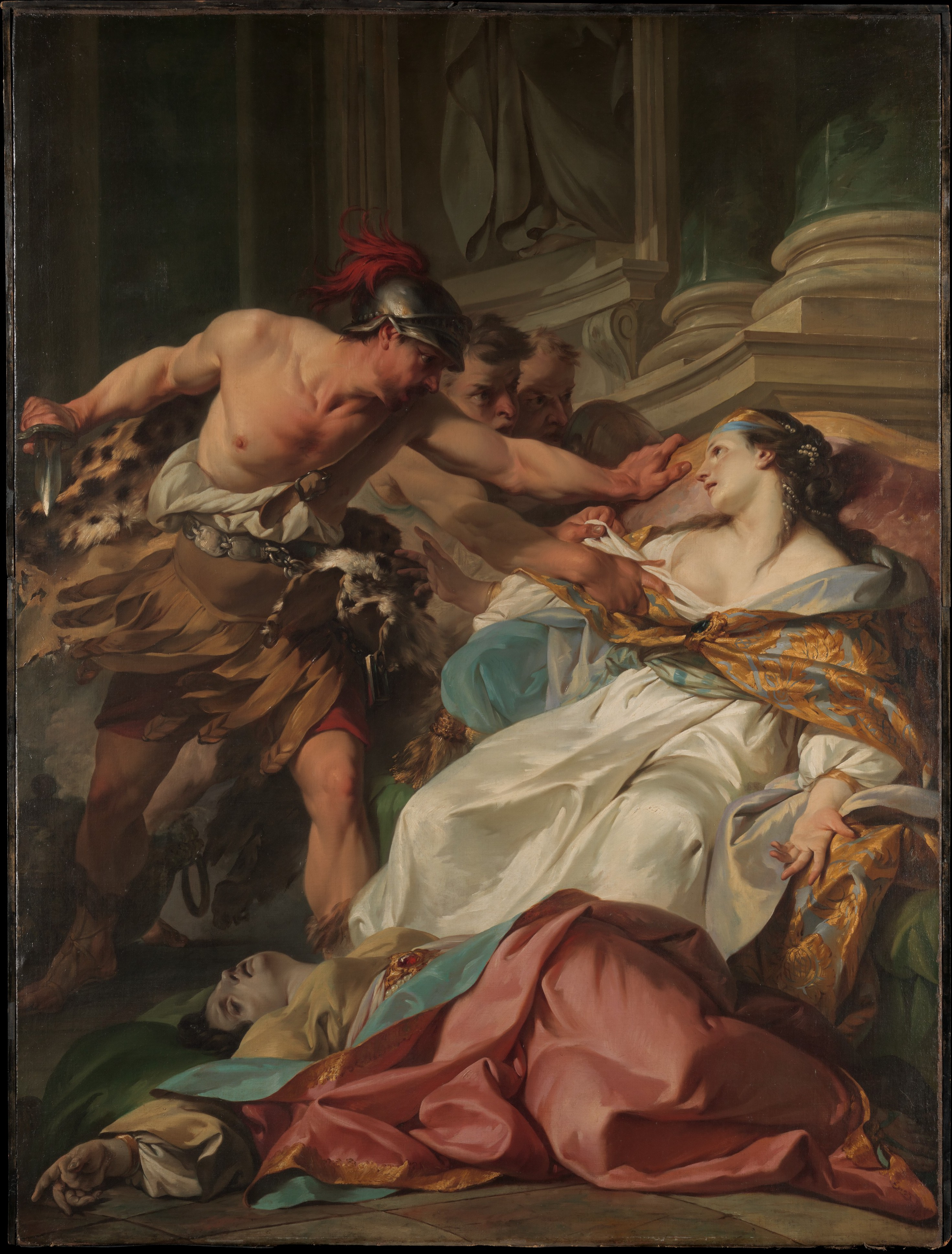
The Death of Harmonia (c.1740–41) The Metropolitan Museum of Art

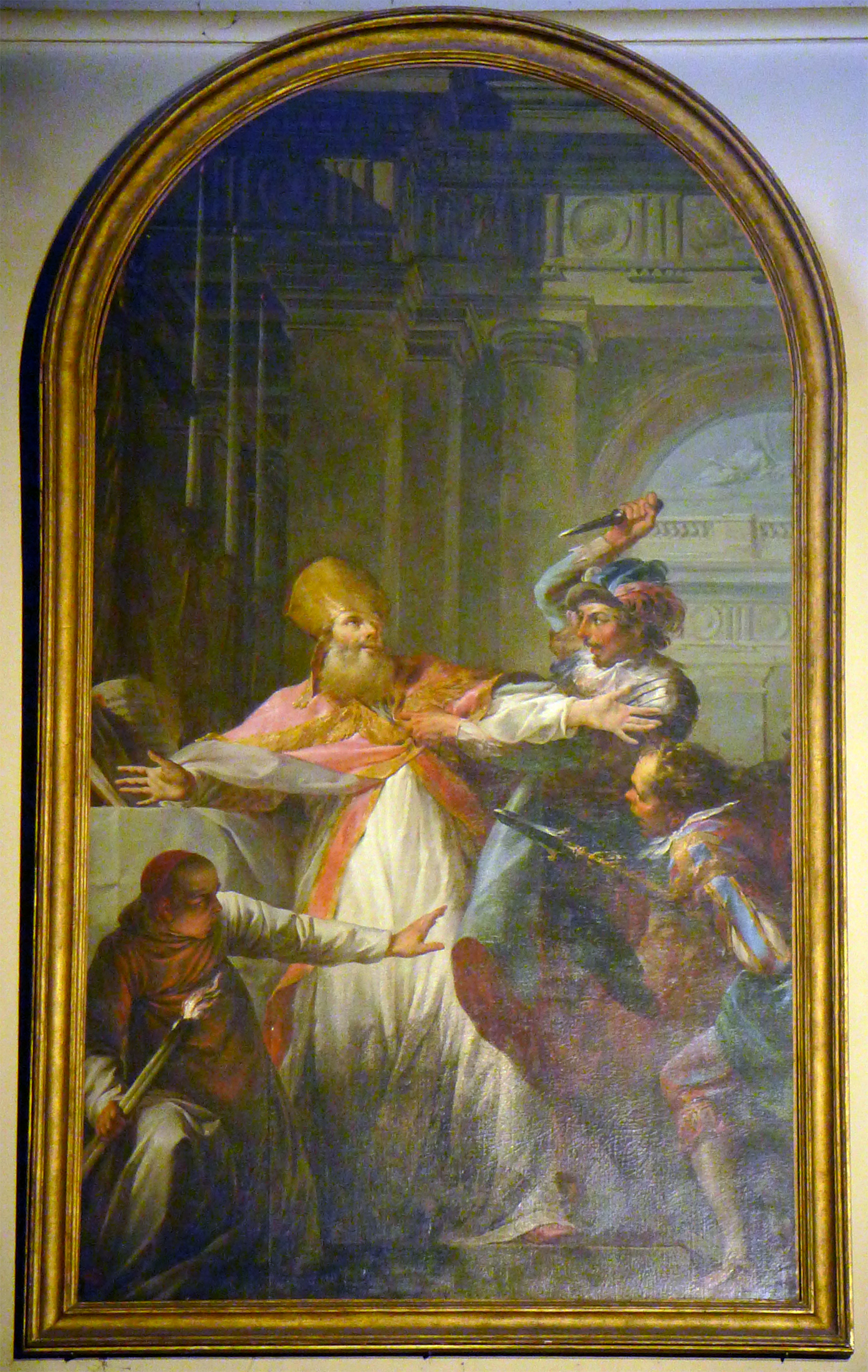
The Assassination of Thomas Becket
Église Notre-Dame-de-la-Nativité de Bercy - Paris.

== Bibliography ==
- Nicolas Lesur & Olivier Aaron, Jean-Baptiste Marie Pierre 1714-1789 Premier peintre du roi, Paris, Arthena, 2009, ISBN 978-2-903239-41-1
- Marc Furcy-Raynaud, Correspondance de M. d'Angiviller avec Pierre, J. Schemit, Paris, 2 volumes, 1905–07
- Olivier Aaron, Jean-Baptiste Marie Pierre, 1714-1789, Cahiers du Dessin Français, issue 9, Galerie de Bayser, Paris; Ars Libri, Boston, 1993
- Christian Michel, Charles-Nicolas Cochin et l'art des Lumières, École française de Rome, Rome, 1993 (Contains Pierre's letter on the causes of the decadence in the art of France)
