= Margareta Stafhell =

Swedish artist (1720–1762)

Margareta Stafhell, also called Staffhell, Stafell and Staffhell-Åkerman, (1720–1762), was a Swedish chalcography artist.

== Biography ==
Margareta Stafhell was the daughter of the silversmith Gustaf Stafhell (1683-1761) and his wife Catharina Olofsdotter Beckman. She was the sister of silversmiths Gustaf Andreas Stafhell d.y. (1725-1772) and Andreas Stafhell (1730-1794) and the cousin of artist Ulrika Pasch (1735-1796). She married the spice merchant Jean Meijer in 1744 and in 1759 the goldsmith Petter Åkerman (1723-1792).

She produced engravings by the method of chalcography. Among her work were engravings of a copy of a work by Martin Desjardins after a version of Gerard Edelinck and Hyacinthe Rigaud. Several of her works depict biblical scenes. She was active in her profession her entire life: after her death, her own studio is listed among her possessions.

She is represented in the collection of engravings at the Nationalmuseum in central Stockholm.

== Other sources ==
- Elsebeth Welander-Berggren Stafhell (Stafell), släkt urn:sbl:20032, (Svenskt biografiskt lexikon), accessed 2015-02-07.
- Anna Lena Lindberg Ulrica Fredrica Pasch(Svenskt kvinnobiografiskt lexikon. translated by Alexia Grosjean)
- Anna Lena Lindberg Ulrica Fredrica Pasch och 1700-talets konstvärld (Stockholm: Signum, 2010) ISBN 9789186221058
