= Hugues Taraval =

French painter (1729–1785)

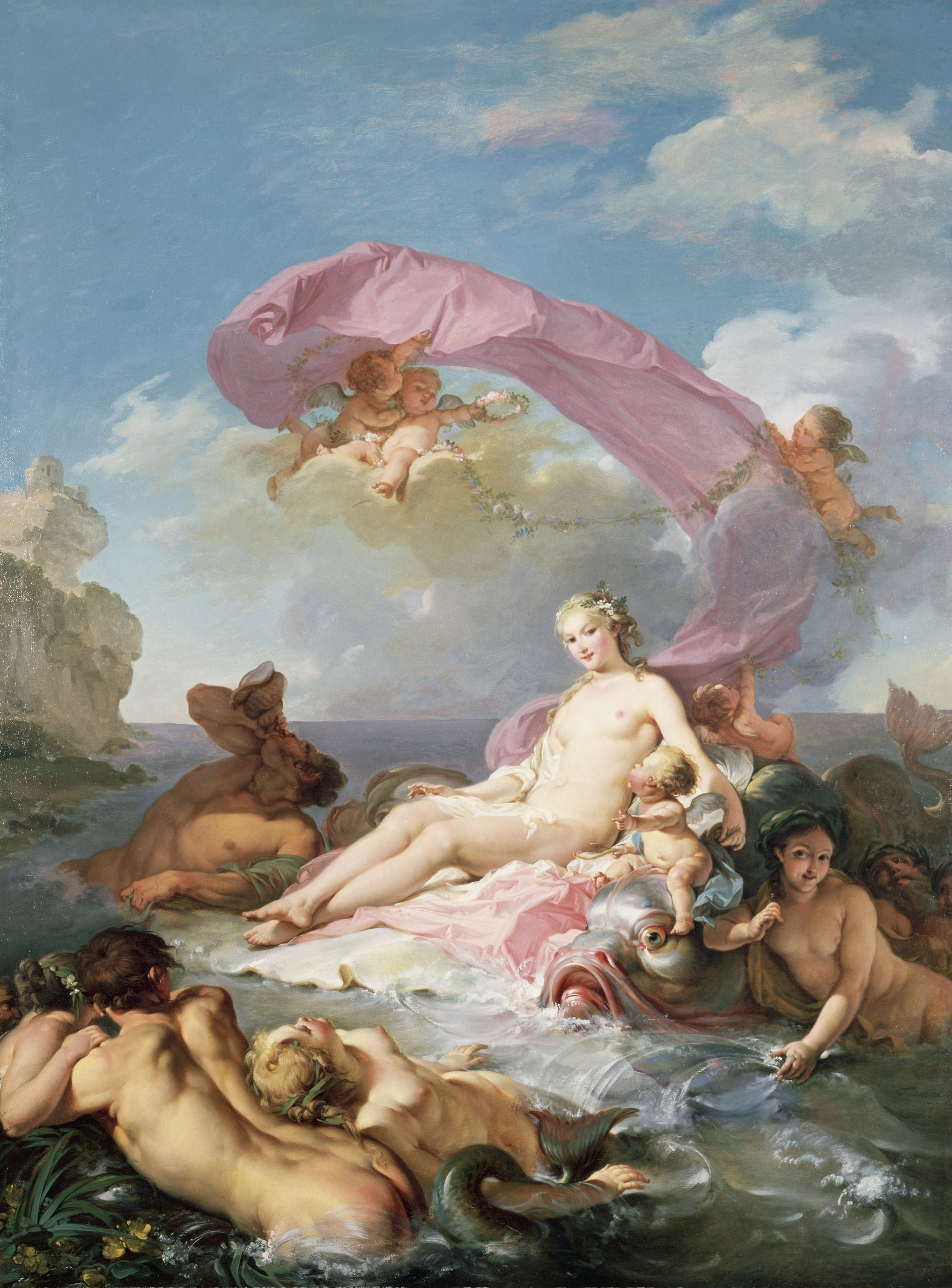
The Triumph of Amphitrite by Hughes Taraval, Mead Art Museum, 1780

Jean-Hugues Taraval (French pronunciation: [ʒɑ̃ yɡ taʁaval]; 27 February 1729 – 19 October 1785) was a French painter.

Taraval was born in Paris, the son of the French painter Guillaume Taraval, who moved his family to Stockholm in 1732 to work on the decoration of the new Royal Palace. Initially a pupil of his father, Hugues returned to Paris after his father's death in 1750. There he studied with Jean-Baptiste Marie Pierre and Charles-André van Loo.

In 1756, he won the Prix de Rome with Job Mocked by his Wife, now in the Musée des beaux-arts de Marseille. In Rome he was a pupil of Charles-Joseph Natoire at the Académie française.

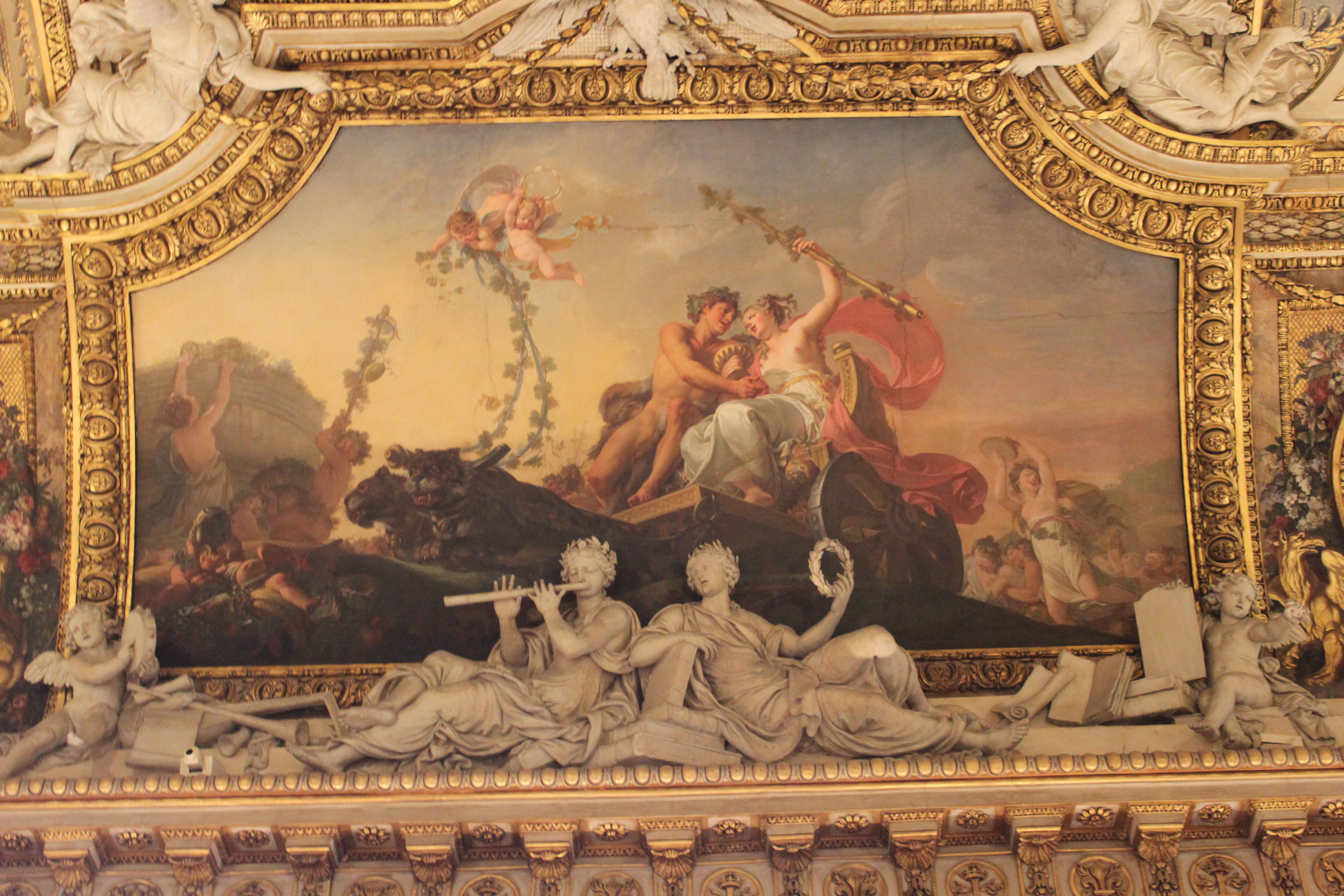
Hugues Taraval, L’Automne or Le Triomphe de Bacchus et d’Ariane, 1769, Galerie d'Apollon, Louvre

Admitted to the Académie royale de peinture et de sculpture (Royal Academy of Painting and Sculpture) in Paris in 1765, he was received there in 1769. His reception piece is a Triumph of Bacchus, one of the elements of the ceiling of the Galerie d'Apollon in the Louvre. As a painter and decorator he worked at the Château de Bellevue, France in Meudon (1767), the École Militaire (Military School) of Paris (1773), the Collège de France (1777), the Château de Marly (1781), and the Palace of Fontainebleau (1781).

Hugues Taraval died in Paris.

== Bibliography ==
- Lee, Simon (1996). "Taraval", vol. 30, p. 343, in The Dictionary of Art (34 volumes), edited by Jane Turner. New York: Grove. Also at Oxford Art Online (subscription, Wikipedia Library access or UK public library membership required).
- Riot (Delphine), Hugues Taraval: a state of the art, Master Thesis, University of Lille III, Lille, 2001 (Unpublished).
- Riot (Delphine), Hugues Taraval (1729-1785): Painter Ordinary King. (Article in preparation)
- Sandoz (Mark), "Hughes Taraval (Paris 1729-1785)", Bulletin of the Society of the History of French Art, 1972 (éd.1973), p. 195-255.
