= The Death of Harmonia =

Painting by Jean-Baptiste Marie Pierre

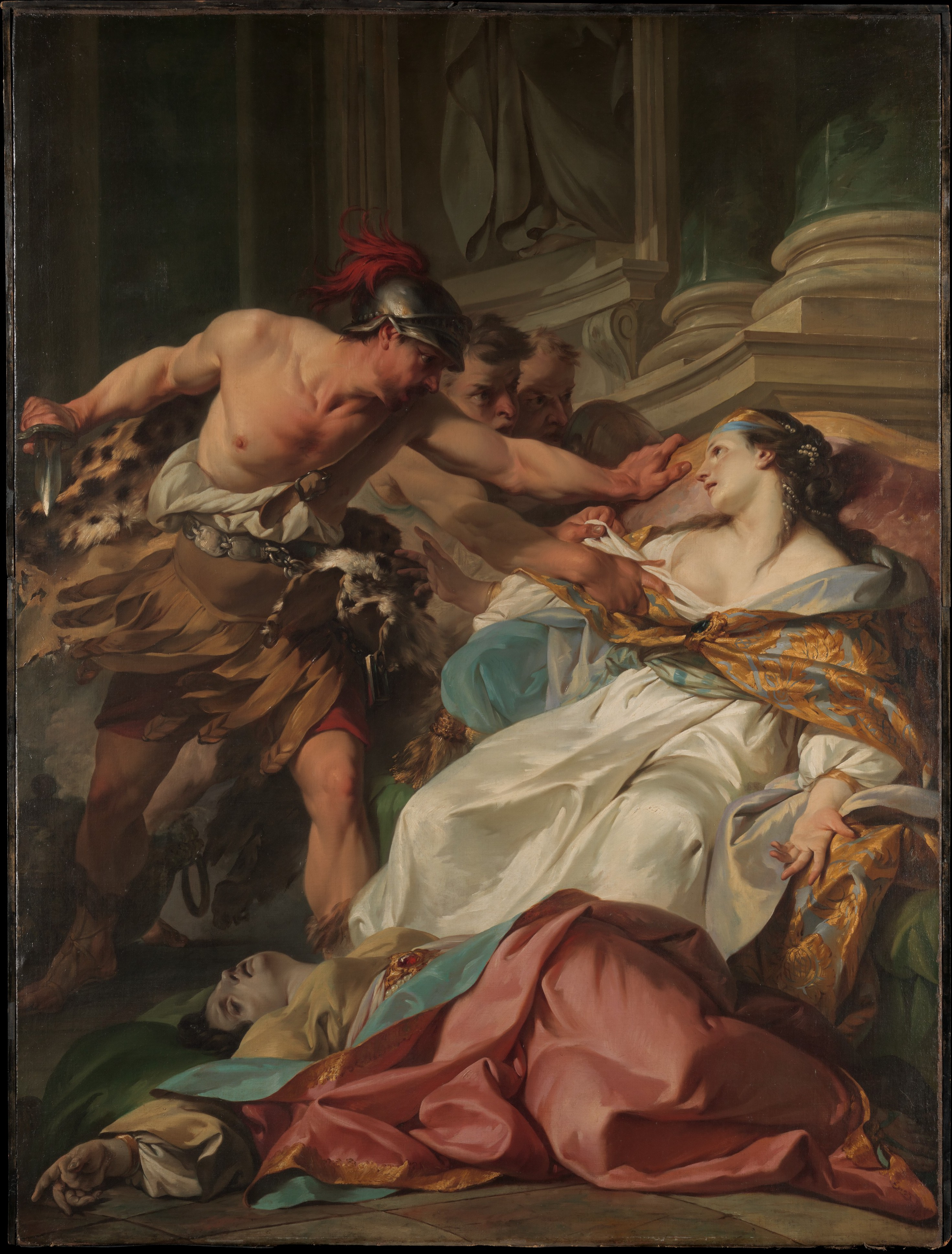
- Artist: Jean-Baptiste Marie Pierre
- Year: c. 1740–41
- Medium: Oil on canvas
- Dimensions: 196.9 cm × 148 cm (77.5 in × 58 in)
- Location: Metropolitan Museum of Art; New York
- Accession: 69.129

The Death of Harmonia is an 18th-century painting by French painter Jean-Baptiste Marie Pierre. Done in oil on canvas, the work depicts the death of Harmonia of Syracuse. It was exhibited at the Salon of 1751 at the Louvre in Paris. The painting is in the collection of the Metropolitan Museum of Art.

Harmonia was the daughter of Gelon II, King of Syracuse. In 214 B.C she was under threat from conspirators and her governess attempted to save her life by exchanging her clothes with those of a slave girl. The slave girl, dressed in the princess' clothes, was subsequently murdered in error by the conspirators. Overcome with remorse Harmonia identified herself and was also killed.

The work is on show in the Metropolitan Museum's Gallery 632.
