= Charles Greb =

Canadian business owner and politician

Charles E. Greb (1859–1934) was a business owner and politician in Ontario, Canada. He served as mayor of Kitchener from 1921 to 1922.

He was born in Zurich, Canada West, in 1859. He became a carpenter by trade and operated a hardware store and hotel in Zurich. Greb moved to Kitchener in 1909. He was secretary-treasurer of the Berlin Shoe Manufacturing Company in 1910. He became company owner in 1912 and, in 1916, it was renamed the Greb Shoe Company Limited. His son Erwin took over the operation of the company in 1918 but Greb remained with the company in an advisory role. His grandsons - Harry, Arthur and Charles (Chuck) - later took on senior executive roles and are credited with bringing Hush Puppies to the Canadian market.

Greb served on Kitchener city council from 1917 to 1921, 1924 to 1927, and 1929 to 1931. He died in 1934 and was buried at Woodland Cemetery in Kitchener.
