= Ruth Greb =

German politician (born 1993)

Member of the Landtag of Rhineland-Palatinate
- Incumbent
- Assumed office 1 January 2026
- Preceded by: David Guthier

Personal details
- Born: 5 November 1993 (age 32)
- Party: Social Democratic Party (since 2011)

Ruth Elisabeth Greb (born 5 November 1993) is a German politician serving as a member of the Landtag of Rhineland-Palatinate since 2026. She has served as chairwoman of the Social Democratic Party in the Rhein-Hunsrück-Kreis since 2021.
