= Gordon Greb =

American journalist (1921–2016)

- Born: August 7, 1921; Irvington, California
- Died: September 12, 2016 (aged 95); Chico, California
- Education: University of California at Berkeley; University of Minnesota
- Scientific career
- Fields: Broadcast education, history and investigative journalism
- Workplaces: San Jose State University
- Thesis: Freedom of the Movies in Presenting News and Opinions (1950)

Gordon B. Greb (August 7, 1921 – September 12, 2016) was a professor of San Jose State University, a "distinguished broadcast educator"' historian and an investigative journalist.

== Early life and education ==
Greb was a fourth generation Californian. He was born on a farm in Irvington (Alameda County), California, and grew up in Oakland and San Leandro. His father worked as a Southern Pacific railroad engineer and his mother was a housewife.

During the Great Depression, young Greb sold magazines door to door (Saturday Evening Post, Liberty), earned a few dollars selling cartoons and stories to Oakland newspapers (Tribune, Post Enquirer) and for a short time appeared on radio as a child actor (Rusty, Boy Aviator, KTAB, 1934).

After serving as editor of his high school newspaper and winning the Rotary Club oratorical contest supporting world peace in spring 1939, he completed his undergraduate degrees (AA, BA) at the University of California at Berkeley, his master’s (MA) at the University of Minnesota, and became a Ph.D. candidate at Stanford University.

== Military ==
After Pearl Harbor, Greb volunteered for the U. S. Army and served three years in World War II (1943 to 1946). On maneuvers with the 102nd Infantry Division at Camp Swift, Texas, he contracted pneumonia, received last rites from a Catholic chaplain and needed 104 days of hospitalization to recover. His outfit was shipped overseas without him. He was assigned to Special Services at Fort Dix, New Jersey, and rose to staff sergeant while editing the camp newspaper (The Fort Dix Post) and working as a recording engineer in the WDIX studios.

== Entrepreneurship ==
In 1942, with Dave Houser, Greb initiated the Bay Area’s first local radio newscast over KROW in Oakland. In 1954, he formed Gordon Greb & Associates, a survey research company that measured listenership for local radio stations. In 1962, he began the Co-Ad Agency with Kenneth Roed to place advertising in college newspapers nationwide. In 1972, Greb created Newsmaker Features that syndicated his "Birthday Quiz" and "These Great People" in such dailies as the San Jose Mercury-News, Seattle Times and San Rafael Daily Independent.

== Advocacy ==
=== Ending film censorship ===
In order to challenge a long-standing decision by the U.S. Supreme Court that had permitted movie censorship in eight states and 90 cities, Greb prepared a thesis calling for freedom of the movies. He offered it to the law firm of Ephraim S. London, which was appealing the New York State Board of Regents' ban on exhibition of a controversial film called The Miracle. At the time, Greb was a graduate student at Stanford University. The result was a precedent-changing unanimous decision (9-0) protecting movies from censorship under the First Amendment in Burstyn v. Wilson, et al. (1952). The decision overruled Mutual Film Corporation v. Industrial Commission of Ohio that had upheld film censorship for more than 37 years. In thanking Greb for allowing him to quote his research in the oral argument, London wrote, "I am amazed that someone who is not a lawyer could have had so clear a comprehension of the legal questions involved."

=== Exposing state corruption ===
As an investigative reporter at a San Jose radio station (KSJO), he began conducting interviews by telephone and compiling documents that enabled him to uncover improper influence peddling involving millions of dollars of California’s money at the state capital. Coming as a surprise to the entire press corps in Sacramento, he exposed a bitter behind-the-scenes struggle between two of California’s most powerful officials – Gov. Goodwin J. Knight and State Treasurer Gus Johnson – concerning who should benefit from the profit-making potential of the state’s treasury. Broadcasting the story to his Northern California audience (jointly released statewide by UP) ultimately brought about a state legislative inquiry that forced Johnson to resign in what the UP bureau chief Jim Anderson in 1956 called "the best state political story in many a moon".

=== Making historical discovery ===
In 1959, Greb published a research paper in the Journal of Broadcasting proving that San Jose was the birthplace of broadcasting. He provided documents and witnesses to establish that the first broadcaster was a Stanford University dropout – former science major Charles David Herrold – who was transmitting regularly scheduled programs starting in 1909 from his College of Engineering and Wireless in the Garden City Bank building that predated the accepted beginning (KDKA, 1920) by eleven years. Herrold worked in collaboration with his wife Sybil and numerous students. Greb’s revelation of Herrold’s accomplishment was significant enough for Journal of Broadcasting editor Robert Summers to credit him for making a "first station find" (winter 1958-59 issue) and for the media authority Christopher H. Sterling to recognize Herrold as one of the founding fathers of Silicon Valley, since he was at "…the very beginning of what has grown into the modern electronic media business".

=== Political activism ===
In the 1950s, Greb joined Alan Cranston (later U.S. Senator) in organizing the Democratic Club movement that challenged the Republican Party domination in the state of California. He participated in campaigns that elected Nicholas Petris and Robert Crown to the state assembly and Carlos Bee and Alfred Alquist to the state senate, among others, while active with the Democratic Party’s State Central Committee.

In 1969, Greb handled press relations for the local union president Al Rutherford, and the state leader John Sterling of the American Federation of Teachers (later Phoenix University founder) in a 37-day strike by faculty members at San Jose State College. While their union action was opposed by Gov. Ronald Reagan, it eventually led to legislation that granted collective bargaining rights to teachers.

== Journalism ==
Greb became a journalist as a youngster in 1935 by publishing his own newspaper in Oakland, California, (The Katz Meow) with Jack Corbett when both were in junior high school. He started his professional career as a newspaperman for the San Leandro News Observer in 1939 and continued after World War II at the San Rafael Independent Journal. He then moved to San Francisco Bay Area radio stations KROW, KRCC, KLX, KTIM, KVSM, KSJO and KSJS; television stations KNTV, KABC, KNBC, KQED, KCSM, and KTEH; as well as network stations owned by CBS and ABC in Hollywood, and NBC in Burbank. He has been heard on the BBC World Service and featured on the PBS series History Detectives.

A veteran of radio broadcasting since 1934, Greb is one of the oldest of Northern California’s notable broadcasters and was named to the Bay Area Radio Hall of Fame in 2011. During his career in radio and television, he was a judge for the Emmy Awards of the Academy of Television Arts and Sciences and statewide chairman of the radio and television awards committee of The Associated Press.

== Teaching and research ==
A founding member and co-ordinator of the School of Journalism’s Graduate Program in Mass Communications, Professor Greb retired from San Jose State University in 1990. During his years in higher education, Greb lectured internationally at universities in the United Kingdom, Australia, China, Fiji, New Zealand and Thailand as well as at Stanford University, the University of Oregon (Eugene), the University of Minnesota (Minneapolis) and the University of Wisconsin (Madison).

He taught courses at San Jose State University (1956 -1991) in all media – newspaper, magazine, public relations and broadcast journalism, the latter being a new program he introduced in 1957 and which became the state’s first B.A. degree in that discipline. Early in his career he helped to pioneer instructional television with recorded lectures on "The Press and Democracy" in 1960 and "“Contemporary Issues in American Society" which he organized in 1967 with professors from history, political science and philosophy.

To provide American students with a world view, he took them abroad during several years to study in the United Kingdom (1980-1983), teaching a summer course on the "British Mass Media", holding seminars at Imperial College, the BBC, ITV, The Times, Fleet Street and ABC News (Peter Jennings).

At the invitation of the U.S. State Department, Greb was a guest lecturer at China’s Radio-Television News Center and the University of Beijing in 1985, and an information specialist for news media and educational institutions in New Zealand, Australia and Fiji in 1991.

== Publications ==
=== Master's thesis ===
"Freedom of the Movies in Presenting News and Opinions" (University of Minnesota, 1950). TC Wilson Library Annex Sub-Basement (MA Theses) Quarto 378.7M66 OG7972.

=== Books ===
- Contemporary Issues in American Society: A Study Guide for Instructional Television Course (1967) Edited with Whitaker T. Deininger, Billie Barnes Jensen, and James E. Watson.
- The Benbow Family, California Pioneers: A History and Genealogy from England to America of Thomas and Sarah Benbow, 1820 to Today (1994)
- Charles David Herrold: Inventor of Radio Broadcasting (2003). Co-authored with Mike Adams.
- Google Brain: Making Your Memoir a Time Machine on the Internet (2009).

=== Video, films and DVDs ===
- KQW: World’s First Broadcast Station, (1980), presenter, 22-minute 16 mm film featuring pioneer broadcaster Ray Newby, directed by Jim Ashcroft and produced by Dr. Clarence Flick of San Jose State University.
- "The Sumi Artist, (1958) narrator of documentary on Chiura Obata, professor of art at the University of California, Berkeley, produced by Lobett Films, San Francisco.
- The American Newspaper: What Makes the Democratic Press Different," (1961) host of 16 mm. 40-min. motion picture, ITV Center, San Jose State University.
- The Dow Chemical Demonstration, (1967) host of 35-min videotape of documentary aired over KQED-TV based on taping of three-hours of live coverage of event from San Jose State for KNTV (channel 11), San Jose, CA.
- Why Did He Die? (1968) Host of 30-min. videotape documentary on assassination of Martin Luther King Jr. aired over KCSM-TV.

=== Scholarly articles ===
- The Place of Journalism in the Junior College", Journalism Quarterly, 31: 354-57 (Summer 1954)
- "The Golden Anniversary of Broadcasting", Journal of Broadcasting, 3-13 (Winter 1958-59)
  - "Surveying Public Opinion by 'Beeper' Telephone", Journalism Quarterly, 36: 57-81 (Winter 1959)
- "Station Research Can Pay Its Way. Western Advertising" (January 1958)
