= Guillaume Taraval =

French painter

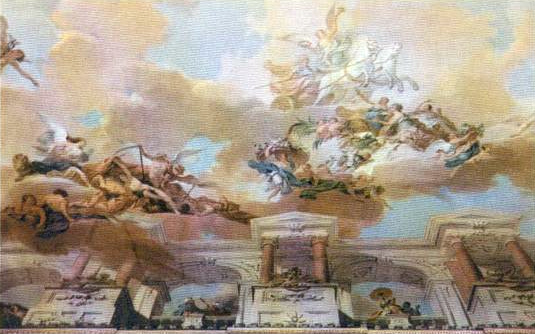
White Sea, ceiling painting fresco by Guillaume Thomas Taraval, depicted on postcard

Guillaume Thomas Taraval (21 December 1701 – April 1750) was a French born, Swedish painter.

== Biography ==
Guillaume Thomas Raphaël Taraval was born in France, the son of François Taraval and Catherine Masson. He became orphaned early in life and was raised by his foster-father Henry Guillemard (1665-1728) who also gave him the first lessons in painting and drawing. He continued his education with the artist Claude Audran (1658–1734).

Together with other French artists, Taraval arrived in Stockholm in 1732. Taraval was mainly active in the Stockholm Palace. He produced a series of elegant ceiling paintings and introduced the Rococo decorative style to Sweden. He also painted portraits, altarpieces and still lives, and prepared sketches for a chandelier in the chapel, which was then completed by his disciple Johan Pasch. He also played a major part in the Royal Swedish Academy of Arts, becoming its first director on its foundation in 1735. In 1739, he was granted leave to travel to Paris to study the new latest developments in French art, returning to Sweden in 1740. He died during 1750 in Stockholm.

== Personal life ==
In 1727 married his foster-father's daughter Marie-Anne François Guillemard (b. ca 1705). He had two sons, the French painter Hugues Taraval (1729-1785) and the French architect and engraver Louis Gustave Taraval (1738-1794). The latter's son, Jean-Gustave Taraval (1765-1784) was also a French painter.

== Sources ==
- Lee, Simon (1996). "Taraval", vol. 30, p. 343, in The Dictionary of Art (34 volumes), edited by Jane Turner. New York: Grove. Also at Oxford Art Online.
- Carl G. Laurin, Konsthistoria, Stockholm, 1919
