= Grebo, Sweden =

Grebo
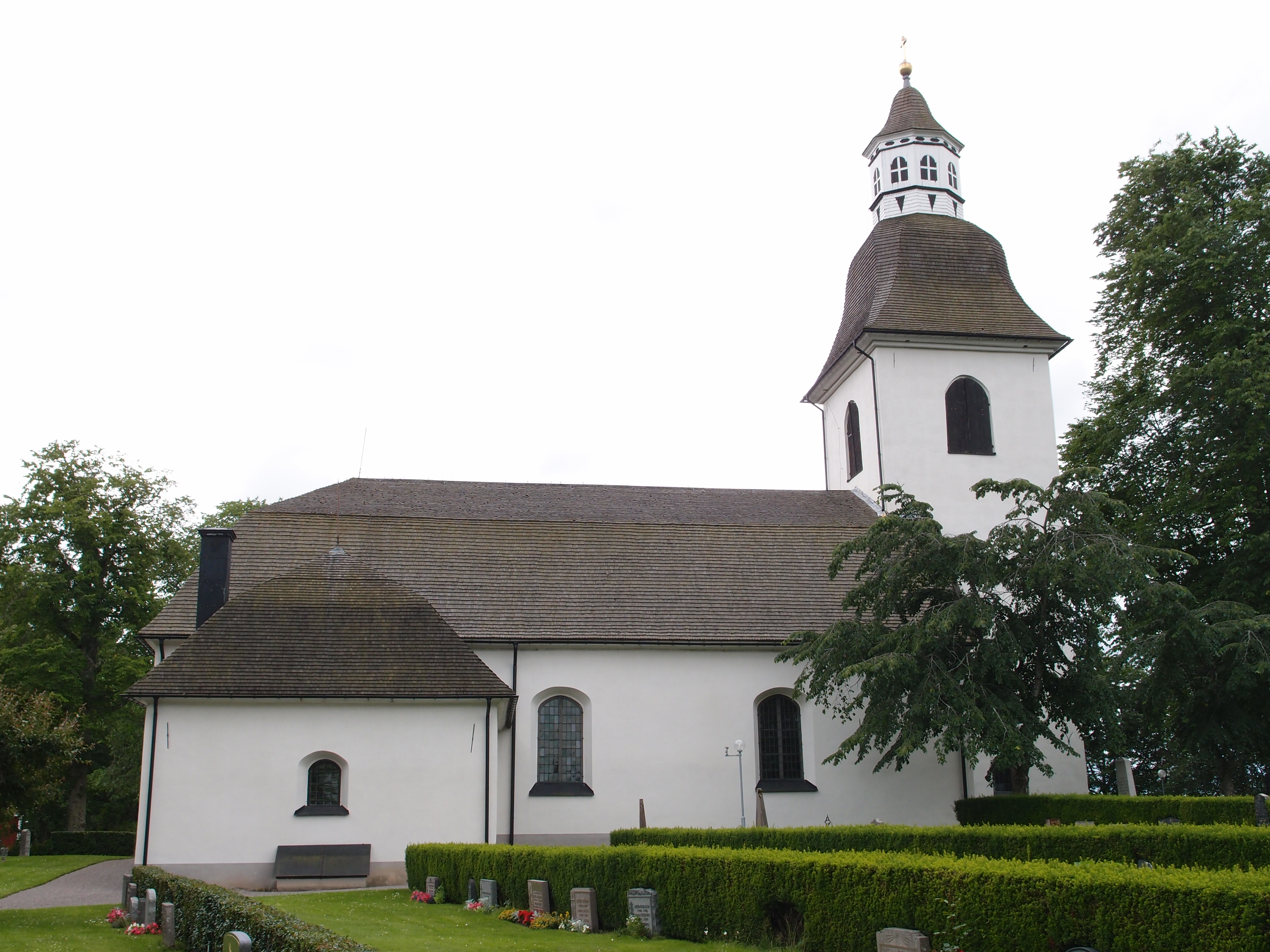
- Grebo Church

- Location within Östergötland Location within Sweden
- Coordinates: 58°18′N 15°51′E
- Country: Sweden
- Province: Östergötland
- County: Östergötland County
- Municipality: Åtvidaberg Municipality

Area
  - Total: 0.72 km^{2} (0.28 sq mi)

Population (31 December 2020)
  - Total: 1,071
  - Density: 1,500/km^{2} (3,900/sq mi)
- Time zone: UTC+1 (CET)
  - Summer (DST): UTC+2 (CEST)

Grebo is a locality situated in Åtvidaberg Municipality, Östergötland County, Sweden with 970 inhabitants in 2010.
