= Johan Pasch =

Swedish painter, etcher and decorative artist

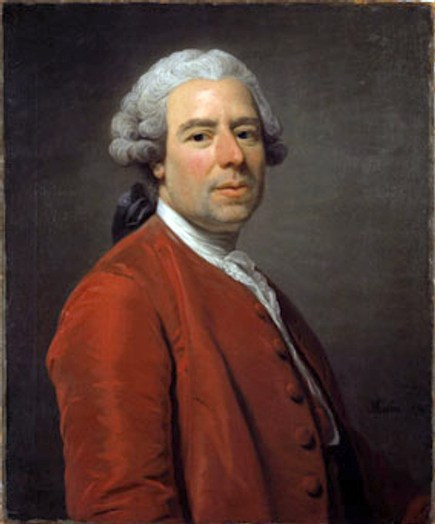
Johan Pasch, portrait by Alexander Roslin (1756)

Johan Pasch (12 March 1706, Stockholm - 16 January 1769, Stockholm) was a Swedish painter, etcher and decorative artist. He is sometimes referred to as The Elder to distinguish him from another, minor, painter named Johan Pasch (1752-1811), who may have been distantly related.

== Biography ==
His father was the decorative painter and village Elder, Danckwardt Pasch (1660-1727), who originally came from Lübeck. His brothers, Danckwardt Pasch the Younger (1690-1759) and Lorens Pasch the Elder also became painters.

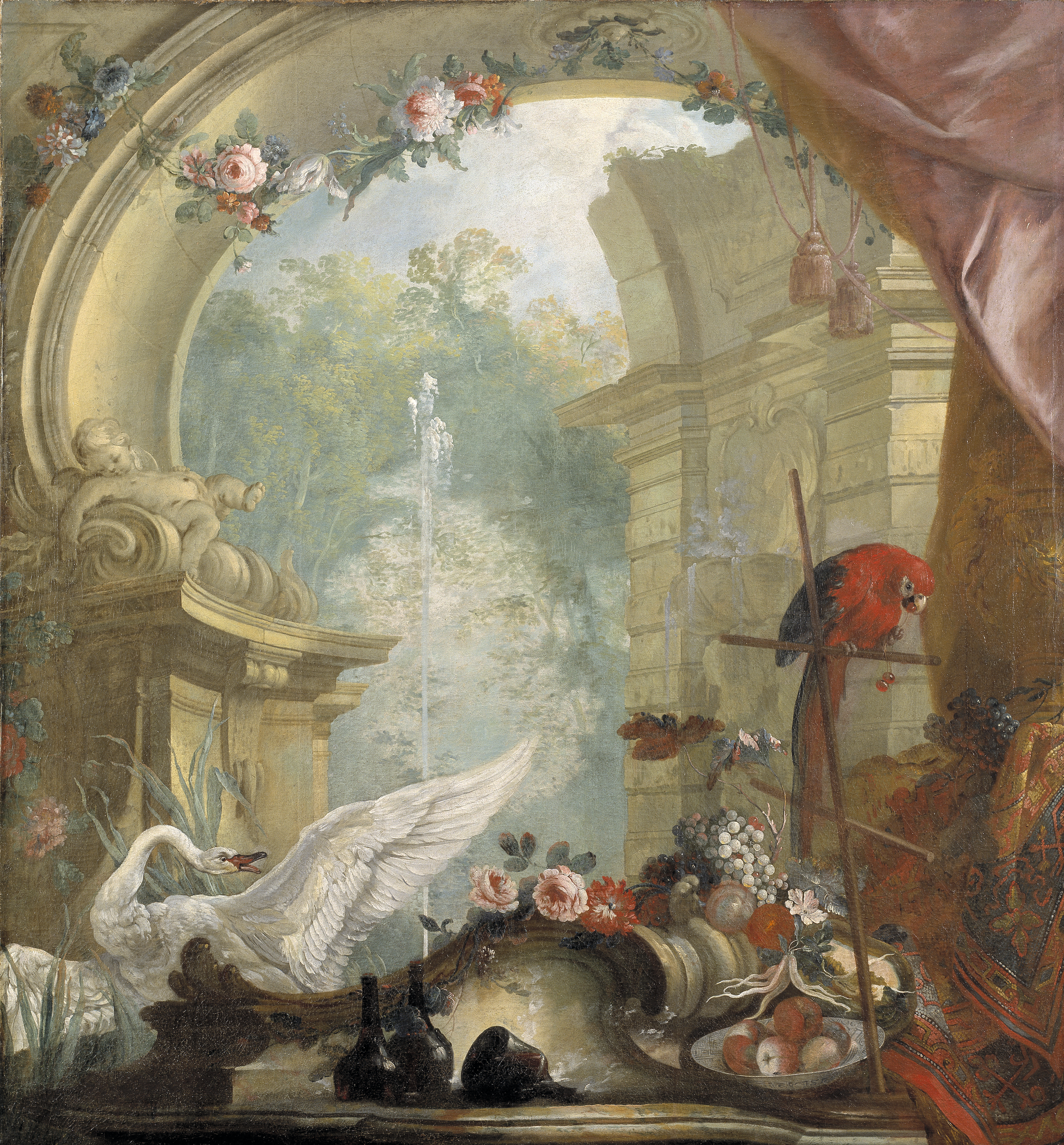
Landscape with Ruins

He studied with his father until 1724, then became a Journeyman painter. Over the next decade, he made numerous study trips, notably to Holland and Paris, where he was exposed to the new Rococo style. After his father's death, he took over the workshop and was certified as a Master in 1734. The following year, he was enrolled as one of the first students at the newly founded "Kungliga Ritareakademien" (now the Royal Swedish Academy of Fine Arts), where he studied drawing with Guillaume Taraval, the school's first Director. After completing his studies, he was hired by the architect, Carl Hårleman. Later, he became Taraval's teaching assistant and worked with him at Stockholm Palace where he, Domenico Francia and Alessandro Ferretti were decorating the ceilings.

In 1737, he married Anna Catharina Fristedt (1720-1778), the daughter of a stonemason. He made further visits to Paris in 1740 and 1741, while continuing to teach at the Academy and work on the decorative paintings at Stockholm Palace. His commissions increased to the point where he found it necessary to take on a young painter, Jonas Hoffman, as an assistant.

He was appointed a Court painter in 1748 and, upon a petition by Hårleman, was exempted from paying taxes. Beginning in 1755, he made an extensive study trip to Rome and Paris, financed by Queen Luisa, and accompanied by the architect, Jean Eric Rehn. They passed through Berlin and Vienna on their way; Holland and Denmark on their return. He would later create decorations for the Queen in the rooms at Svartsjö Palace.

In 1757, he built an estate in what is now Bellevue Park, designed by his friend, Rehn. He died without heirs, so the estate passed to Rehn, who sold it to Baron Carl Sparre in 1782. It is believed that Sparre coined the name, Bellevue.

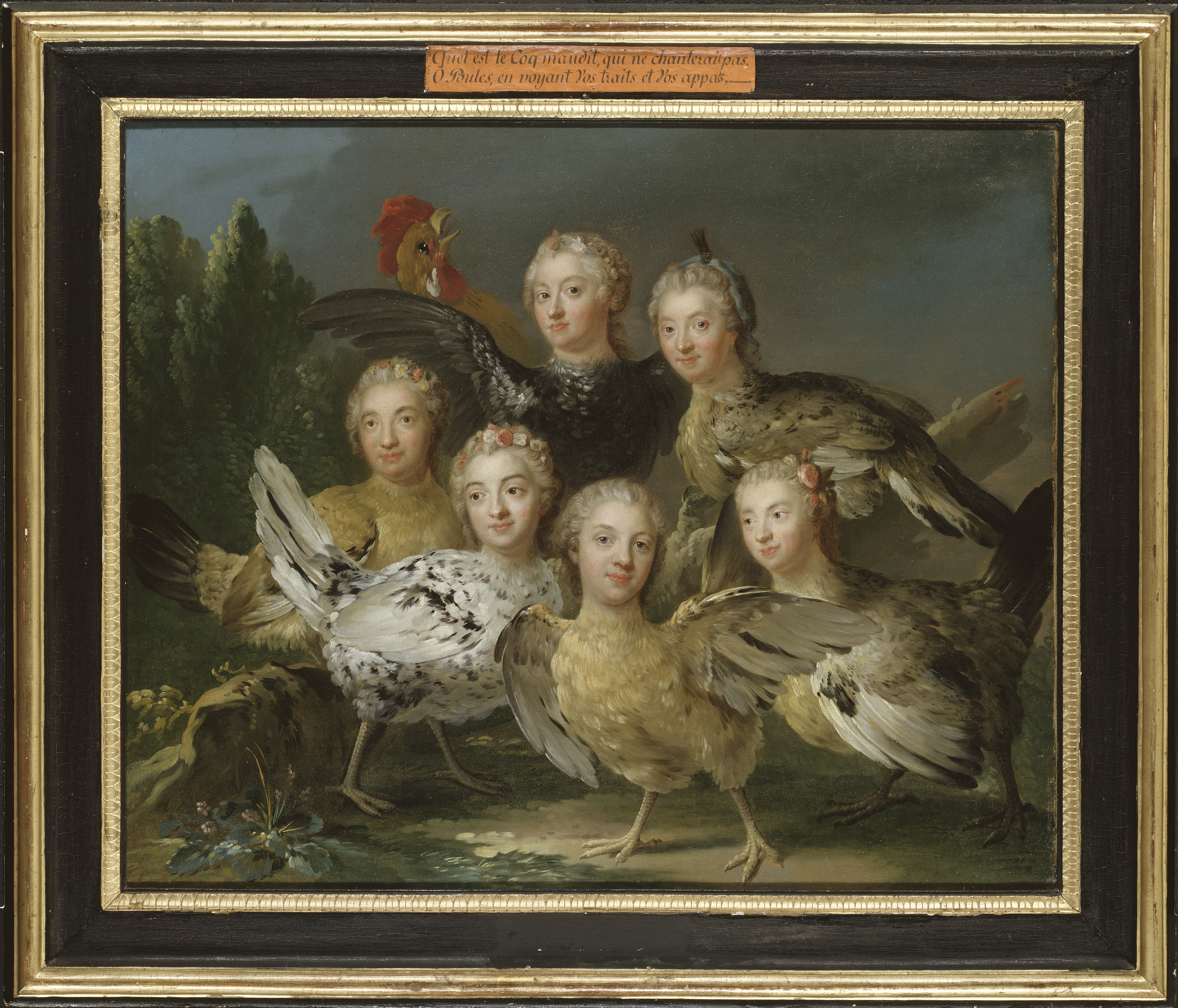
The "Hen Picture" (Hönstavlan)

He was appointed "Hovintendent" (a type of curator) at the court in 1758, and worked on a large project at Åkerö Manor. From 1763 to 1765, he worked at Erstavik Mansion and, from 1765 to 1768, his major projects were at the Chinese Pavilion and Drottningholm Palace, where he created a large series of allegorical panels.

His canvases may be seen at the Uppsala University Library and the Nationalmuseum.

== Other sources ==
- Svensk uppslagsbok, Malmö 1931.
- Sven Sandström, Konsten i Sverige, Norstedts, Part 1, 1997, pgs. 410, 422, 462, 488, 490, 491 and 554 ISBN 91-1-913692-7
