= Catherine Charlotte De la Gardie =

Swedish courtier and countess

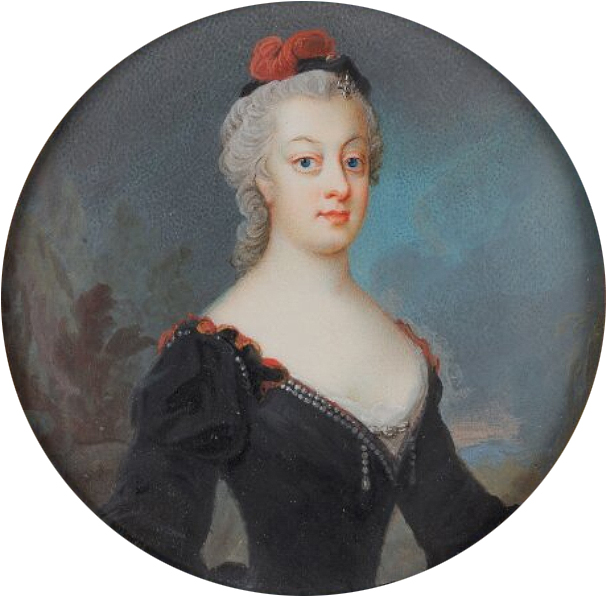
Arenius, Catharina Charlotta Taube

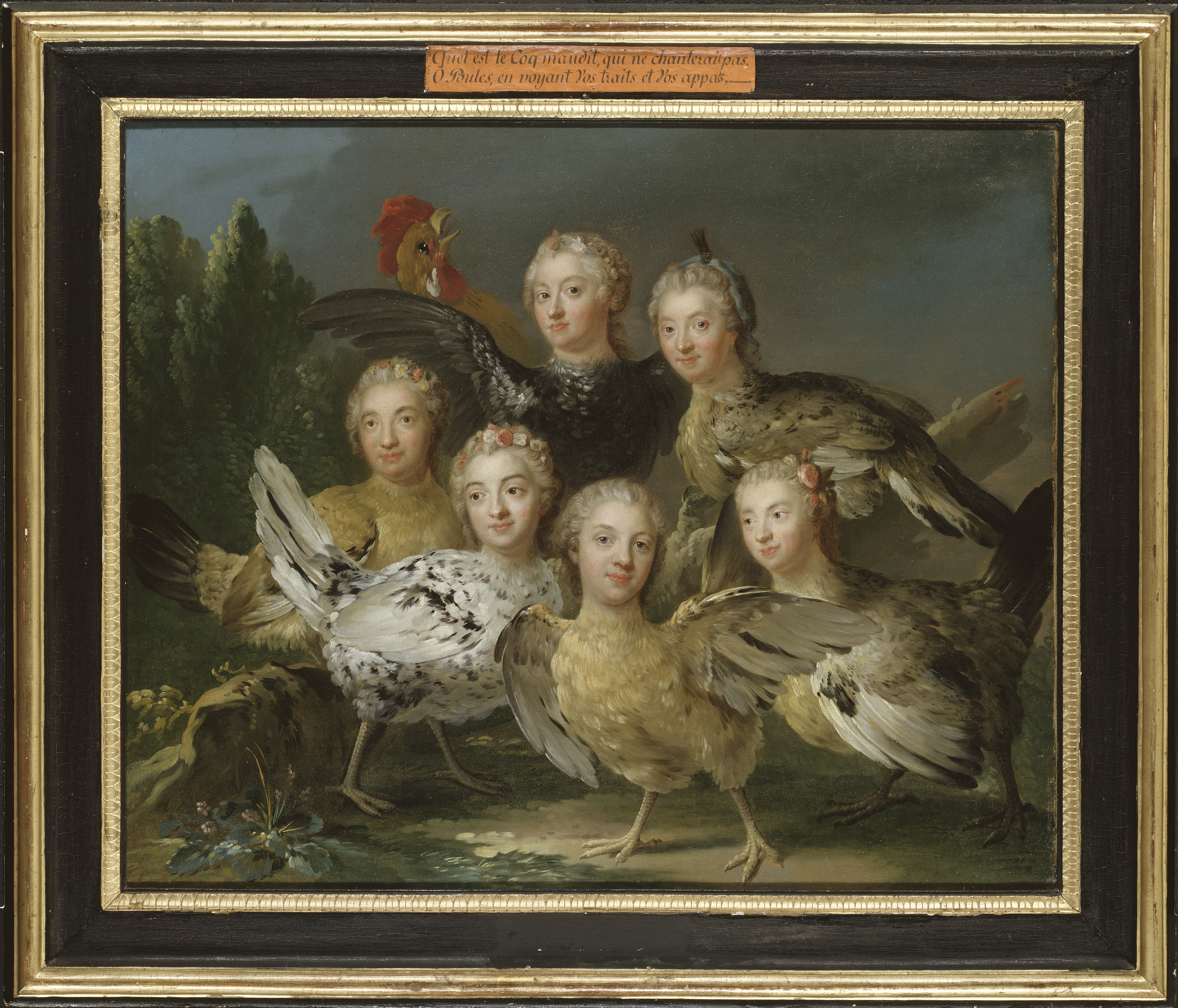
The ´Hen Picturé' by Johan Pasch and Johan Henrik Scheffel from 1747, featuring six maids-of-honor to crown princess Louisa Ulrika: Ernestine von Griesheim, Henrica Juliana von Liewen, Charlotta Sparre, Ulrika Strömfelt, Agneta Strömfelt och Cathérine Charlotte Taube.

Countess Catherine Charlotte De la Gardie (née Catharina Charlotta Taube; 5 April 1723 – 24 March 1763), also known as Catherine Charlotte de La Gardie, was a Swedish countess and courtier. She is famed for her support of the smallpox vaccination in Sweden, and for stopping the last witch trial in her country.

== Life ==
Born to Count Edvard Didrik Taube of Odenkat and Kristina Maria Falkenberg, Catherine was the younger sister of the royal favourite Hedvig Taube, who was the royal mistress to king Frederick I of Sweden from 1731 to 1744. Catherine Charlotte served as hovfröken to Crown Princess Lovisa Ulrika from 1744 until 1748.

Catherine Charlotte De la Gardie has been described as talented, brave, beautiful and clear sighted, without prejudices and with an open mind. She received but a customary shallow lady's education of accomplishments meant to make her attractive on the marriage market, but she educated herself in various subjects through autodidacticism, and became a supporter of the Age of Enlightenment.

She was a life friend of Olof von Dahlin and Carl von Linné, who expressed his admiration of her.

She married Count Pontus Fredrik De la Gardie, brother of scientist Eva Ekeblad, in 1748. After the wedding, she settled at Sjöö Castle.

=== Pioneer of smallpox vaccination ===
One of the two acts for which she is most famed is for her public support of smallpox vaccination. Her efforts to encourage the use of vaccination have sometimes been referred to as the breakthrough for smallpox vaccination among the public, and though this may be an exaggeration, she is known as an avid supporter of the then very controversial method.

While baroness Katarina Charlotta Ribbing, the spouse of Charles De Geer, was in reality the first of the Swedish aristocracy to have her children inoculated, it was Catherine Charlotte De la Gardie who, after following the example of Ribbing by having her children vaccinated, became a pioneer by popularizing this method among the peasantry.

Smallpox vaccination was officially introduced to Sweden in 1756, initially meeting with a great deal of resistance. De la Gardie is regarded as one of the pioneers of smallpox vaccination, as she actively sought to encourage the public to implement it. The resistance among the peasantry was great, but she managed to convince some parents to vaccinate their children, which allegedly caused a breakthrough in the willingness to use smallpox vaccination among the peasantry. The children in question have, whether correctly or not, been referred to as the first Swedish children to be vaccinated.

=== Prevented a witch trial ===
The second act for which she is remembered was her successful efforts to stop the last witch trial in Sweden. In 1757, a witch hysteria broke out in the parish of Ål in Dalarna, where thirteen women and five men were accused of abducting children and bringing them to a witches' sabbath. Governor Pehr Ekman ordered their arrest, interrogation and torture.

De la Gardie became aware of the trial during a trip to Dalarna in 1758. By the help of her connections, she informed the authorities in the capital and thus managed to have the trial stopped. The matter had been treated by the local authorities and church, and when it became known in the country, it was treated as a scandal. While witchcraft trials were formally still legal in Sweden, the law was in practice considered defunct and witch trials a phenomenon of the past; no person had in fact been executed for witchcraft for half a century. The parliament issued an investigation, the accused were all freed, and Governor Ekman, who had accepted charges of witchcraft and had allowed torture, was sentenced to jail and stripped of his position.

De la Gardie helped the victims of the witch hunt with legal assistance and made sure they were granted compensation from the state, as the torture had made them incapable of work.

For this act, she was nationally hailed as a heroine and was in 1761 awarded a medal by Riddarhuset with the inscription: Catharina Charlotta Taube, comitissa De la Gardie, Fulcrum infelicibus, Ob XII ab injuria servatos cives Ordo R. Equ. 1761. The Latin inscription on the medal read in translation:

“A source of help to those in need. From the knights and nobility on behalf of twelve female citizens saved from injustice.”

=== Love triangle ===
Catherine Charlotte De la Gardie was a friend of the poet Hedvig Charlotta Nordenflycht, whose most famous poem, Öfver en Hyacint, is a love poem which describes Nordenflycht's love for the young Johan Fischerström. Nordenflycht's last poem depicts the love triangle between Nordenflycht, Fischerström and Catherine Charlotte De la Gardie, which took place during the winter of 1762/3, when Fischerström was employed as an inspector at the estate of De la Gardie, Sjöö Castle, while Nordenflycht rented a cottage nearby.

De la Gardie died after having contracted a fatal disease while nursing the sick.
