= Henrika Juliana Lieven =

Swedish noble, socialite and lady-in-waiting

Henrica Lieven
- Born: 16 February 1709; London, England, Great Britain
- Died: 26 August 1779 (aged 70) Klara församling, Stockholm, Sweden
- Spouse: Carl Hårleman (m. 1748; died 1753)
- Parent: Hans Liewen

Henrica Juliana Lieven, Swedish, archaic; von Liewen (16 February 1709 – 26 August 1779) was a Swedish noble, socialite and lady-in-waiting, politically active on behalf of the Hats (party) during the Age of Liberty.

== Life ==
Henrica Juliana was the daughter of the riksråd, count Hans Henrik von Liewen the Elder, member of the house of Lieven, and Magdalena Juliana von Tiesenhausen, and the sister of riksråd count Hans Henrik von Lieven the Younger, future governor of Swedish Pomerania and Marshal of the Realm.

During the 1730s, when Frederick I of Sweden and his group of favorites made trips to the country estates of the nobility, trips during which "under the pretext of hunting trips, the indecency sometimes when to far", she was at one point the subject of a scandal during a trip with the King, his brother William VIII, Landgrave of Hesse-Kassel, Hedvig Taube and her sisters to Gripsholm Castle. During the same decade, she, as well as Hedvig Catharina Lilje, participated in the foundation of the Hats (party).

=== Favorite ===
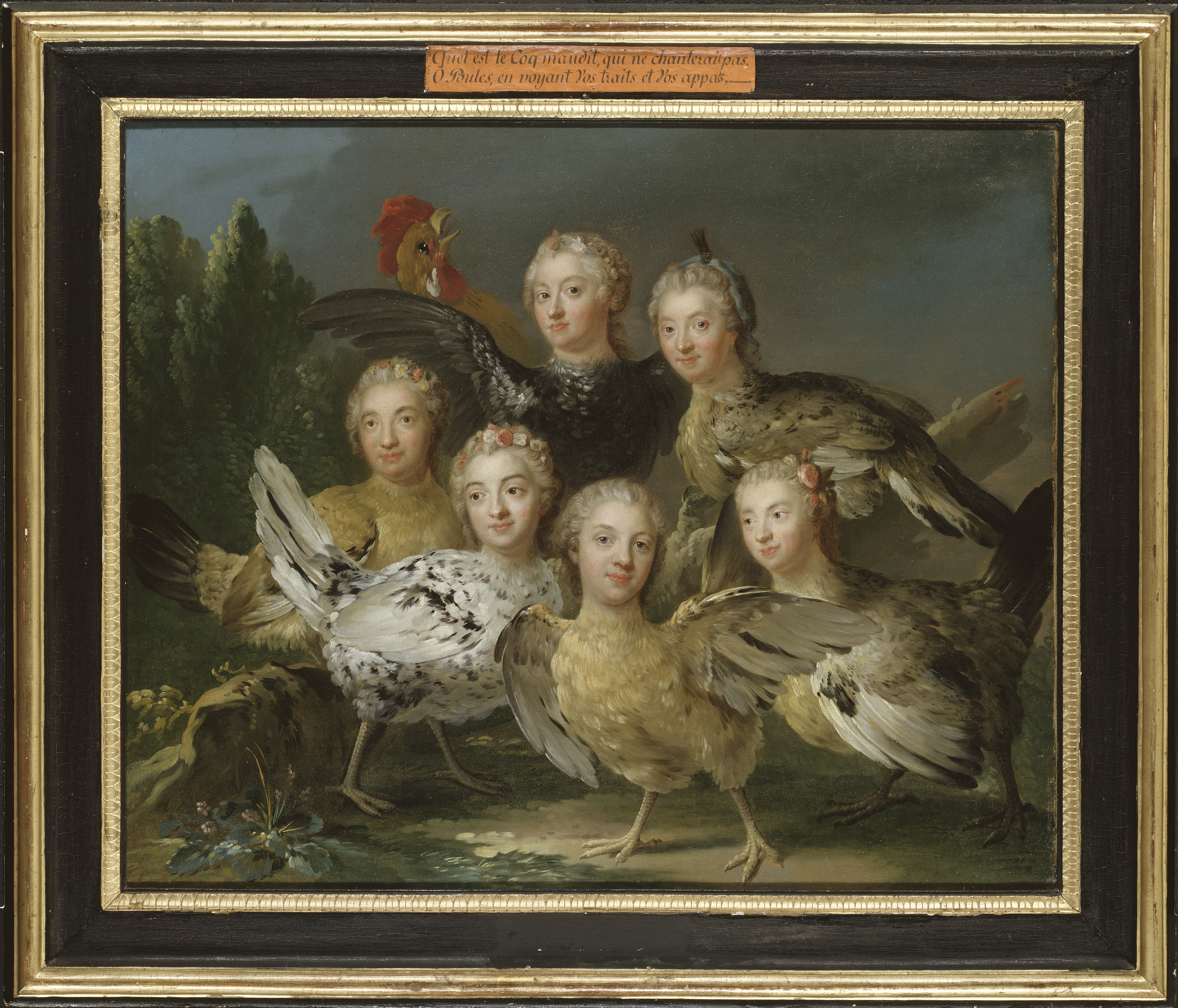
The ´Hen Picturé' by Johan Pasch and Johan Henrik Scheffel from 1747, featuring six maids-of-honor to crown princess Louisa Ulrika: Ernestine von Griesheim, Henrica Juliana von Liewen, Charlotta Sparre, Ulrika Strömfelt, Agneta Strömfelt och Catherine Charlotte De la Gardie.

In 1744, she was made maid of honor to the new crown princess, Louisa Ulrika of Prussia. She belonged to the first circle of courtiers to Louisa Ulrika after her arrival in Sweden together with Cathérine Charlotte De la Gardie, the sisters Agneta and Ulrika Strömfelt and Charlotta Sparre, and is described as Louisa Ulrika’s first favourite. Louisa Ulrika described her in a letter to her mother: "... a girl with many merits and who had the mind of an angel, gay, cheerful and very strong." [...] All my ladies-in-waiting are very beautiful and very funny, each of them can take part in a conversation with no risk of ruining it."

She was the confidant of Louisa Ulrika, and she is believed to have been the informant to expose the first planned Coup d'état of Louisa Ulrika to the ambassadors of Denmark, France and Russia in 1748, a plan which did not have the support of Lieven.

=== Later life ===
In 1748, she married lieutenant colonel baron Carl Hårleman at Drottningholm Palace and retired from court. She was replaced as a favorite of the crown princess by Ulrika Eleonora von Düben.

Countess Lieven was a sympathizer of the Hats (party). She is pointed out as the anonymous editor of the political party paper of the Hats party, "En ärlig Swensk" ("An honest Swede"), which was published in 1755-56 by Nils von Oelreich. The monarch acted against the paper in the parliament, and H. Benzelius declared it to contradict the bible. It was well known that a great part of the Senate gathered in the salon of Lieven to proof read the paper. Her political activism made her the target of slander: the caps politician Johan Arckenholtz accused her of having had an affair with William VIII, Landgrave of Hesse-Kassel during his visit to Sweden in 1732 and of having had a child with the Hessian president Dörnberg.

In 1755, she was granted a pension by the parliament, which was dominated by the Hats party at the time. After the victory of the Caps party in 1765, she almost lost the pension. However, after the death of her spouse, she made a donation of his library about architecture, his drawings and printings, to the royal library of Stockholm, and as this exceeded the value of her pension, she was allowed to keep it.

== See also ==
- Ulrika Strömfelt
