= Louise von Fersen (1816–1879) =

Swedish countess

Hedvig Wilhelmina Augusta Sofia Maria Teresia Lovisa von Fersen (18 March 1816, in Stockholm – 29 December 1879, in Stockholm) was a Swedish countess and heiress, and the last member of the von Fersen family. She was one of the greatest heirs of 19th-century Sweden and became notorious for the scandal of her and her husband's great bankruptcy, having wasted a fortune of about eight million riksdaler on an expensive lifestyle and gambling.

== Life ==
Louise von Fersen was the daughter of Fabian von Fersen (1762–1818) and Louise Piper and thus niece of Axel von Fersen the Younger. She was the sister of Axel von Fersen (1798–1839), Fabian von Fersen (born and died in 1800) and Gustaf Hans von Fersen (1802–1839). She married the courtier count Carl Gustaf Gyldenstolpe (1800–1872) in 1835 and became the mother of six children, among them foreign minister August Louis Fersen Gyldenstolpe and Ida Gyldenstolpe, who married Audley Charles Gosling.

While Louise von Fersen had three older brothers, all died officially childless. When her youngest brother Gustaf Hans von Fersen, a known rake, died "totally décrépit" in 1839, he had three daughters with the ballerina Carolina Brunström, but no children in his three-year-old marriage with countess Sofie Bonde, and the entire von Fersen fortune and all of the estates within it was thereby inherited by Louise von Fersen. Among her inheritance was included the estates Mälsåker House, Ljung Castle, Steninge Palace, Fersen Palace and Finnåker.

Louise von Fersen and her husband were known for their luxurious and expensive lifestyle. They were particularly known for their gambling trips to the casinos of Bad Homburg, Wiesbaden and Baden-Baden. Their lifestyle gradually resulted in them having to sell of estate after estate to cover their debts. In 1853, the gambled away Mälsåker to Fredrik Åkerman on the steamer Gauthiod between Stockholm and Lübeck, in 1855 they were forced to sell Finnåker, and in 1865 the Fersen Palace in Stockholm.

In 1867, they were finally declared bankrupt and their property, including Ljung and Steninge, was sold at public auction, which was a major scandal in contemporary Sweden. Louise von Fersen reportedly smashed a set of Manufacture nationale de Sèvres given to her uncle Axel von Fersen the Younger by Louis XVI to prevent it from being auctioned, and was threatened with imprisonment.

== See also ==
- Matilda Kristina von Schwerin
