= Lindmark =

Lindmark is a surname. Notable people with the surname include:

- Britta Lindmark (1929–2019), figure skater
- Charlotte Lindmark (1819–1858), dancer
- Edmund Lindmark (1894–1968), Swedish gymnast and diver
- Erik Lindmark, band member of Deeds of Flesh
- Peter Lindmark (born 1956), Swedish ice hockey player
