= Eva Dickson =

Swedish explorer (1905–1938)

Eva Dickson, Baroness Blixen-Finecke
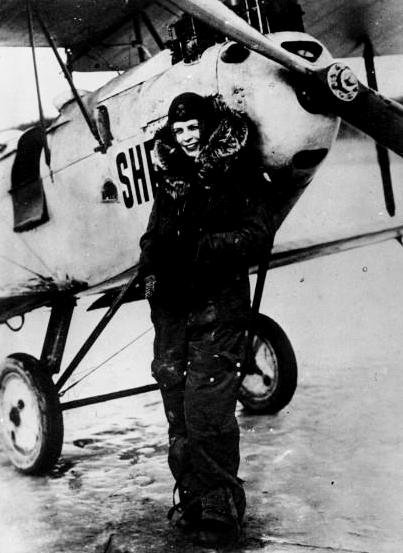
- Dickson in 1933
- Born: Eva Lindström; 8 March 1905; Steninge Slott, Sigtuna, Sweden
- Died: March 1938; Baghdad, Iraq
- Known for: First woman to cross the Sahara desert by car
- Spouses: Olof Dickson (m. 1925; div. 1932) Bror von Blixen-Finecke (m. 1936)

Eva Dickson (born Eva Lindström; 8 March 1905 – March 1938) was a Swedish explorer, rally driver, aviator and travel writer. She was the first woman to have crossed the Sahara desert by car. She was perhaps the first female rally driver in Sweden (1925), and the third Swedish female aviator (1923).

== Biography ==
Eva Dickson was the daughter of the wealthy Albert Lindström, who managed stud farms for horse breeding, and his wife Maria. She was raised at Ljung Castle.

In 1925 she married the rally driver Olof Dickson, great-grandson of James Dickson, but they divorced in 1932 as he didn't agree to her travels. Her travels attracted great attention, and she published several travel guides and descriptions of her experiences. She financed her travels by making bets with various wealthy society people.

In 1932 she met Baron Bror von Blixen-Finecke – the former spouse of Out of Africa author, Karen Blixen. They met in Kenya and soon became lovers. After her meeting with Blixen in 1932, she took a bet and drove by car from Nairobi to Stockholm in 1932, thus becoming the first woman to have crossed the Sahara by car.

In 1934 she was back in Kenya with Bror Blixen, where she participated in various scientific expeditions. The following year they both travelled to Ethiopia, where she covered the Abyssinia Crisis as a war correspondent for The Weekly Journal, a Swedish newspaper. They left Ethiopia on mules, on a 2,000 kilometre trip back to Kenya.

In 1936, the couple married in New York City and spent their honeymoon sailing around Cuba and the Bahamas with friends Ernest Hemingway and his 2nd wife Pauline. The trip ended with the couple visiting Hemingway at his hometown of Key West.

On 3 June 1937, she started a car trip from Stockholm to Beijing via the Silk Road. To become the first person to drive the Silk Road had long been her big dream, and something she wanted to do before settling down with Bror in Kenya. Driving without any companions, the trip took her through Germany, Poland, Romania, Turkey, Syria and Iran. After having reached Afghanistan, she was advised to detour via India, as her intended route was regarded too dangerous for a lone woman. When she reached Calcutta, she was taken ill and treated with a cure of arsenic in a hospital, which worsened her condition.

While in Calcutta she realised that she was running out of money. She also learned the news of the Second Sino-Japanese War and realised that her planned route to China was now impossible and she had to give up her plans to reach Beijing. Although weak after her hospital spell, she decided to drive back to Europe. When she reached Baghdad in Iraq in March 1938, her trip had been going on for nine months. After a dinner one evening outside Baghdad at some friends' house, she was driving back to her hotel, but lost control over the car in a steep curve and crashed. She died immediately. Her husband, Bror von Blixen, was immediately telegraphed about her death, but he was out on a safari and did not get the telegram until he came back to Nairobi on 28 July 1938. By then her body had already been transported to Stockholm, where she was buried on 22 April 1938.
