= Carolina Brunström =

Swedish ballerina

Carolina Brunström (1 January 1803 - 25 January 1855) was a Swedish ballerina. She was considered one of the leading members of the Royal Swedish Ballet in the 1810s and 1820s.

She became a student of the Royal Swedish Ballet in 1812, and a premier dancer (ballerina) from 1820 to 1830. Brunström was described as a star member of the royal ballet during her career.

Among her roles were Fanny in Den ädelmodige Fürsten by Giovanni Battista Ambrosiani, in the ballet to the opera Jessonda by Spohr, and as one of The Three Graces in the pantomime ballet Kärleken och gracerna ('Love and the Graces') alongside Gustafva Calsenius and Charlotta Alm, with Sophie Daguin as Venus, Charlotte Lindmark as Amor, Per Erik Wallqvist as Apollo and Charles Holm as the shepherd.

Privately, Carolina Brunström had a long-term relationship and several children with Gustaf Hans von Fersen (1802-1839), the son and heir of Fabian von Fersen (1762–1818), which is stated as the reason why she chose to retire in 1830 in the midst of great success onstage. Von Fersen, then the perhaps richest heir in Sweden, bought her a house and secured the financial future for her and her children and promised to marry her if she gave birth to a son, but when they had exclusively daughters, his mother convinced him to marry a noblewoman instead: he died officially childless.

The chronicler and theater historian Nils Personne said of her:

"She was one of the acknowledged favorites of the public and much celebrated for her beauty as well as for her significant artistic ability, but in the middle of her triumphs, she chose to abandon the stage to devote her days to raise the children she had with the rich and elegant count Hans von F., owner of Ljung och Steninge. She died at the age of fifty two in Stockholm in very good circumstances."
