= Ulrika Strömfelt =

Swedish noble and courtier

Ulrika Stromfelt
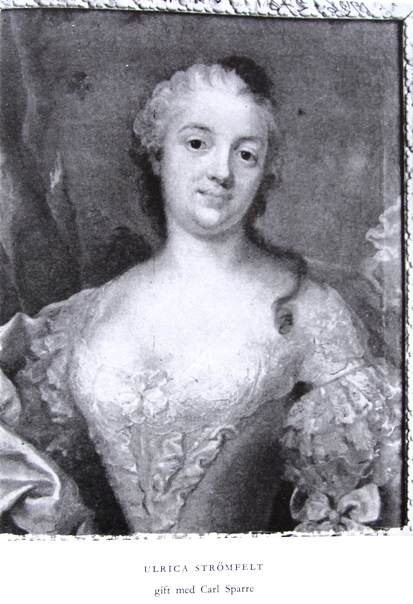
- Born: Martha Ibbetson; 1724
- Died: 5 April 1780 (aged 55–56)

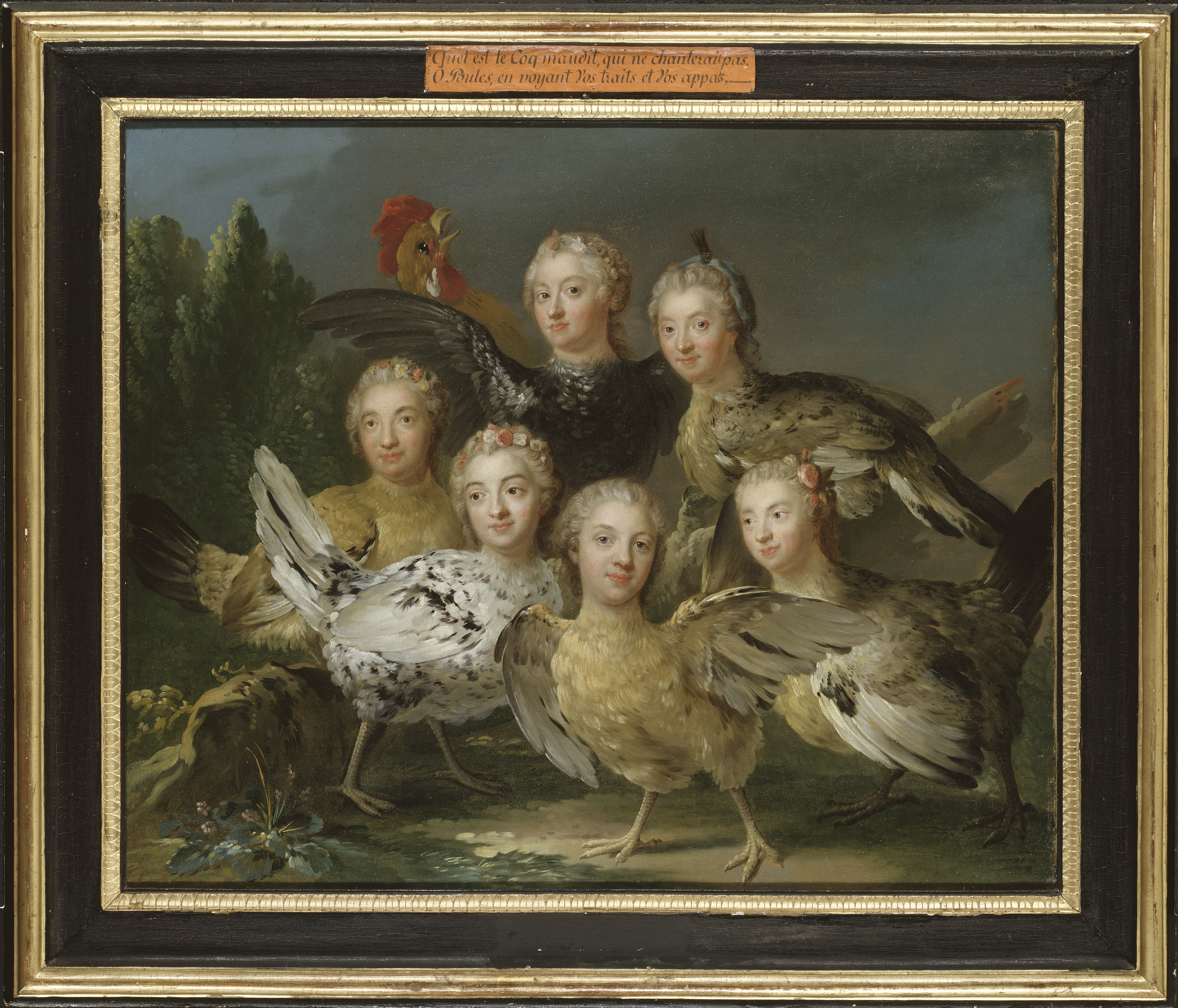
The ´Hen Picturé' by Johan Pasch and Johan Henrik Scheffel from 1747, featuring six maids-of-honor to crown princess Louisa Ulrika: Ernestine von Griesheim, Henrica Juliana von Liewen, Charlotta Sparre, Ulrika Strömfelt, Agneta Strömfelt och Catherine Charlotte De la Gardie.

Ulrika Eleonora Strömfelt (1724 – 5 April 1780) was a politically active Swedish noble and courtier. She is known for her part in the attempted Coup d'état of queen Louisa Ulrika in 1756.

== Life ==
Ulrika Strömfelt was the daughter of riksråd count Johan Carl Strömfelt and the överhovmästarinna and royal governess Hedvig Elisabet Wrangel. In 1739, she became hovfröken (maid of honor) to Ulrika Eleonora, Queen of Sweden. In 1744, she was made maid of honor to the new crown princess, Louisa Ulrika of Prussia. She and her sister Agneta Strömfelt belonged to the first circle of courtiers appointed to Louisa Ulrika after her arrival in Sweden together with Cathérine Charlotte De la Gardie, Henrika Juliana von Liewen and Charlotta Sparre. In 1748, she was promoted to the position of kammarfröken (Chief Maid of honor) after Henrika Juliana von Liewen departure from court. She was apparently well liked by Louisa Ulrika, and was often given the task to read to her from French works.

=== Events of 1756 ===
In 1756, Queen Louisa Ulrika planned a coup d'état to depose the parliamentary system of the Age of Liberty with a restoration of an absolute monarchy. To finance the coup, Louisa Ulrika removed the diamonds from the queens' crown, replaced them with crystals, and pawned the diamonds in Berlin in Prussia to finance her coup. Ulrika Strömfelt, however, was a supporter of the Hats (party) and not in favor of a restored absolute monarchy. According to unconfirmed tradition, Ulrika Strömfelt informed the Riksdag that part of the crown jewels was missing and pawned in Germany. This information led the government to demand an inventory of the crown jewels, which initiated the exposure and failure of the Coup of 1756. A different source claims that it Ulrika Strömfelt informed the foreign office of the Riksdag of the secret correspondence between the Queen and her brother, Frederick the Great. Either way, this led to the exposure of the coup. As a recognition of the act, she was awarded a pension of 2.000 riksdaler in silver and the title "Ständernas dotter" (The Daughter of the Parliament) by the Riksdag.

After the failed coup, she lost the confidence of the Queen, and left court. She was, however, not dismissed, but asked herself to be relieved of her position, officially because of health reasons. That a maid of honor left her position and applied for a pension from the foreign branch office of the Riksdag was unique. Her application was granted, and the pension granted her amounted to double as much as was what usually granted the widow of a riksråd.

The Queen stated that the reason Strömfelt left court was that she was a friend of Carl Gustaf Tessin and "all the notables of the Hat's Party, who, under the very eyes of the Queen, held rendez-vous at the parlor of this Chief Maid of Honor". According to Count Axel von Fersen the Elder, she "was now forced to leave court because of the plots of others", and he pointed out the Queens new favorite Ulrika Eleonora von Düben as responsible: von Düben was promoted to the post of Chief Maid of Honor after Strömfelt.

=== Later life ===
In 1756, the year she left court, Ulrika Strömfelt married the Governor of Stockholm baron Carl Sparre. The marriage is described as happy despite the constant infidelity of her spouse. In 1777, she returned to court and succeeded Anna Maria Hjärne as Överhovmästarinna (Chief lady in waiting or Mistress of the Robes) to the new Queen, Sophia Magdalena of Denmark with Charlotta Sparre as her deputy, a post she retained until her death.

Ulrika Strömfelt has been said to have a "peculiar position" in the diaries and memoirs of the time, because there are no negative remarks about her personality and character, and she is unanimously described as respectable, sensible and as an ideal of contemporary femininity.

Court offices
Preceded by Anna Maria Hjärne	Överhovmästarinna to the Queen of Sweden; 1777–1780	Succeeded by Charlotta Sparre
