= Louise von Fersen =

Swedish countess and courtier (1777–1849)

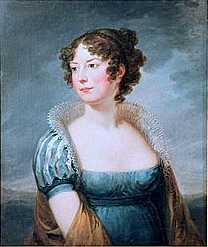
Portrait of (Louise) Sophie von Fersen née Piper, by Carl Fredrik von Breda.

Lovisa Sofia "Louise Sophie" von Fersen, née Piper (26 October 1777 – 4 January 1849), was a Swedish countess and courtier.

Louise von Fersen was the daughter of court chamberlain Sten Abraham Piper and Catharina Ehrensvärd, who had been hovfröken (maid of honour) prior to her marriage. She served as maid of honour to princess Sophia Albertina of Sweden in 1794-97.

She married the courtier count Fabian Reinhold von Fersen in 1797. By marriage, she became the sister-in-law to the famous Axel von Fersen the Younger as well as Sophie Piper, who was married to her brother Carl Piper. Their children: Axel von Fersen (1798–1839), Fabian von Fersen (1800-1800), Gustaf Hans von Fersen (1802-1839) and the great heiress Louise von Fersen (1816–1879), of whom all sons died officially childless (although Gustaf Hans had in fact several children with Carolina Brunström), were the last of the von Fersen family.

She served as hovmästarinna (deputy mistress of the robes) in 1804-05 and överhovmästarinna (Mistress of the Robes) in 1805-09 to queen Frederica, and Mistress of the Robes to queen Charlotte in 1809-10.

Count Hans Gabriel Trolle-Wachtmeister said of her that she "was the most beautiful Juno-like figure you could see [...] undoubtedly the most accomplished woman in high society".

== Sources ==
- "Piper nr 1899". Adelsvapen-Wiki (in Swedish). Retrieved 2025-07-15.
- Anreps ättartavlor

Court offices
Preceded by Hedda Piper	Överhovmästarinna to the Queen of Sweden; 1805–1810	Succeeded by Charlotte Stierneld
