= Pontus Fredrik De la Gardie =

Swedish nobleman and military officer (1726–1791)

His Excellency The High Well-born Count Pontus Fredrik De la Gardie Lord of the Realm KSO GIII:sFadt LMA
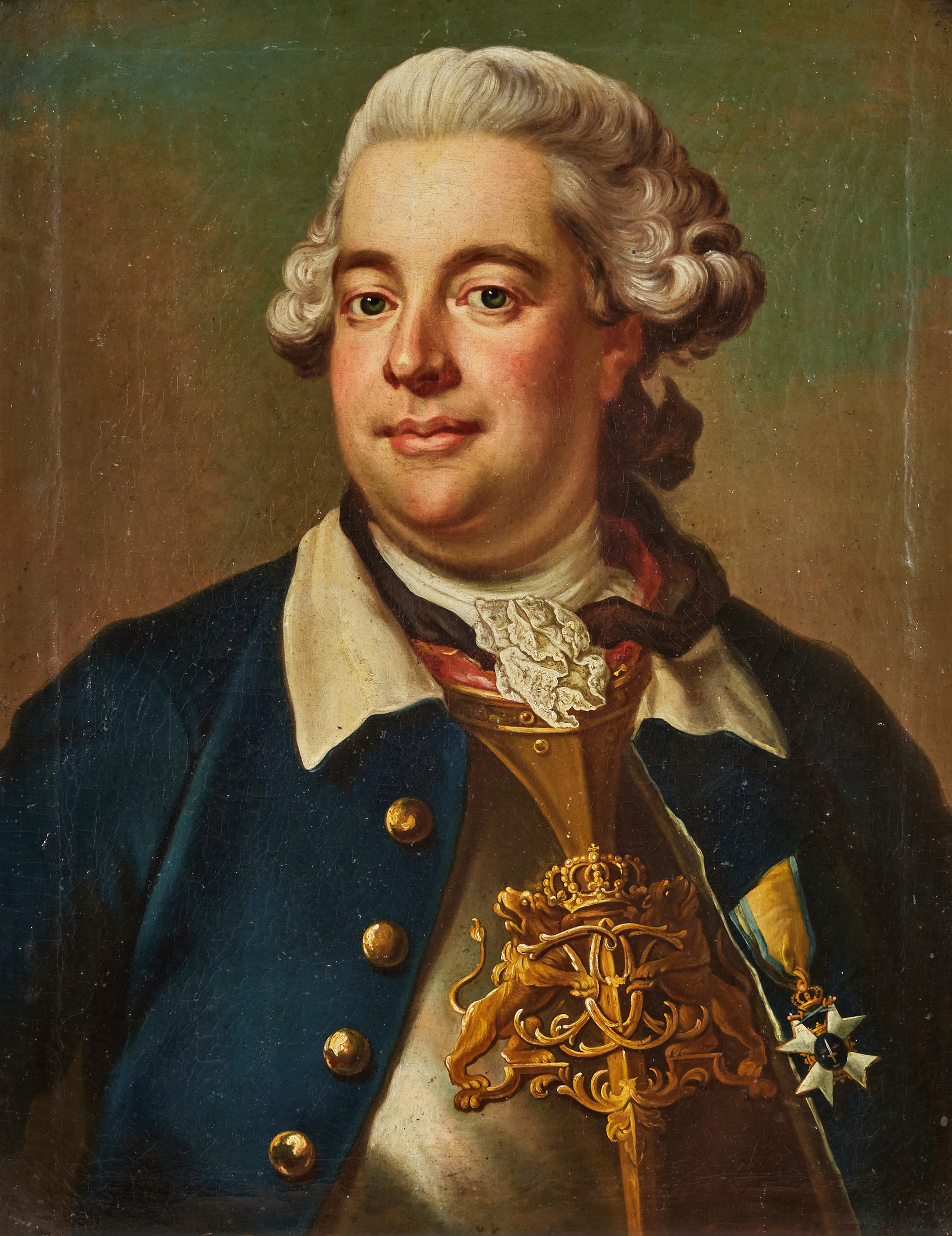
- Portrait by Jakob Björck, c. 1768.

Member of the Council of War
- In office 24 September 1766 – 1766
- Appointed by: Adolph Frederick of Sweden

Personal details
- Born: 15 March 1726
- Died: 7 August 1791 (aged 65)
- Spouse(s): Catharina Charlotta Taube (m. 1748; died 1763) Hedvig Eva Rålamb (m. 1765)
- Relatives: De la Gardie family

Military service
- Allegiance: Kingdom of France; Kingdom of Sweden
- Branch/service: Royal Swedish Regiment; Royal Life Drabant Corps; Scanian Cavalry Regiment
- Years of service: 1744–1774
- Commands: Östergötland Cavalry Regiment; Life Regiment of Horse
- Battles/wars: War of the Austrian Succession; Pomeranian War

Pontus Fredrik De la Gardie (15 March 1726 – 7 August 1791) was a Swedish nobleman and military officer.

== Biography ==
He was the third child of Magnus Julius De la Gardie and Hedvig Catharina Lillie, thus being a member of the De la Gardie family.

In 1744, he served the French in the Royal Swedish Regiment but moved back three years later to serve Swedish military duty, becoming corporal in the Royal Life Drabant Corps. He was promoted to major-general and adjutant-general of Adolph Frederick, King of Sweden. On 10 November 1778, he was appointed godfather of Gustav Adolph, Crown Prince of Sweden, for which he received Gustav III's Godparent Insignia and honoured the Lord of the Realm title.

De la Gardie married twice. First on 4 December 1748 with Catharina Charlotta Taube, daughter of Evert Didrik Taube af Odenkat. They had three children. Two years after her death, he remarried on 10 December 1765 with Hedvig Eva Rålamb, daughter of Claes Gustaf Rålamb. They had six children.

== Honours ==
- Sweden: Knight of the Order of the Sword (13 January 1755)
- Sweden: Commander of the Order of the Sword (21 November 1773)
- Sweden: Recipient of Gustav III's Godparent Insignia (27 December 1778)

== Gallery ==
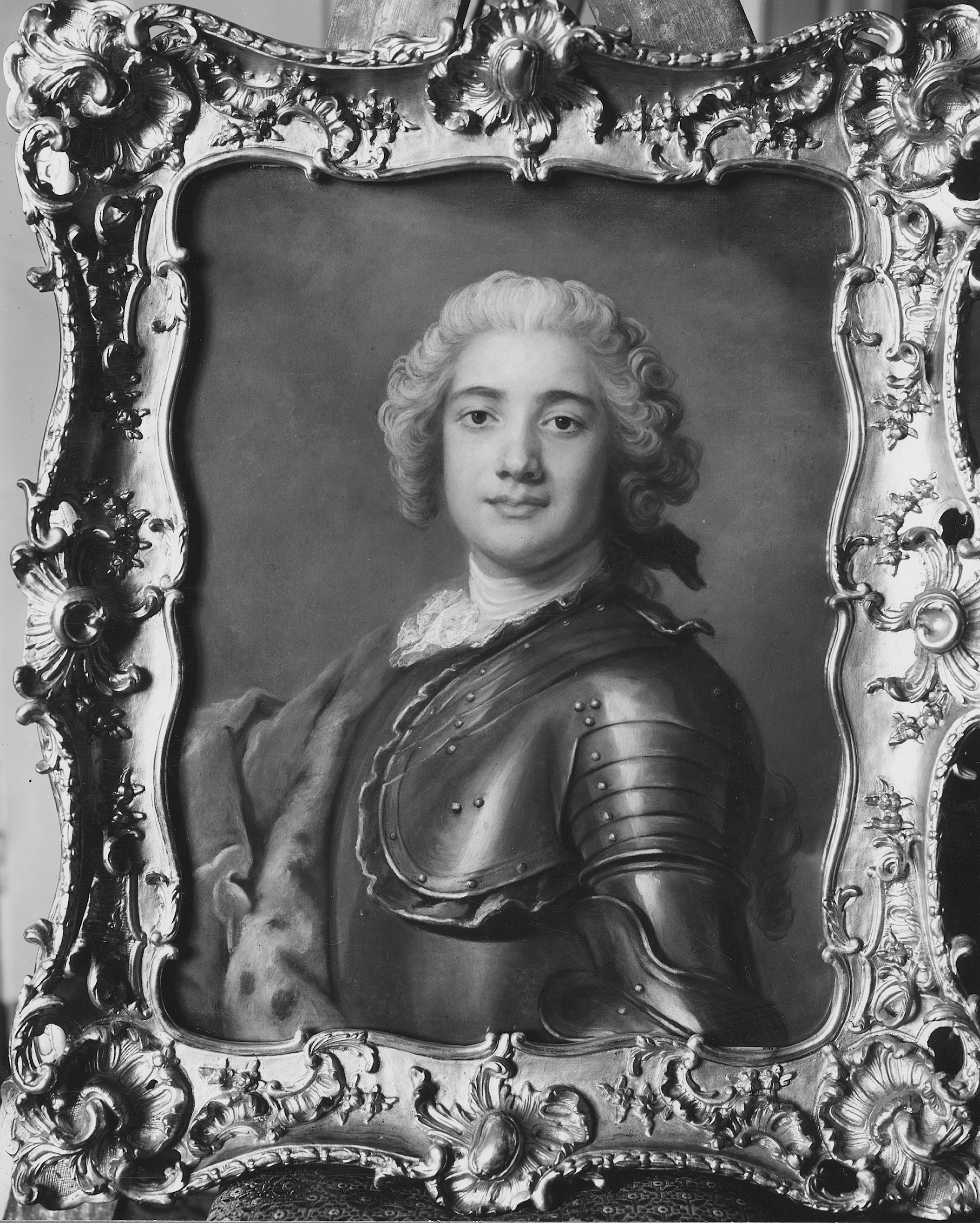
Portrait of De la Gardie in cuirass armour by Gustaf Lundberg.

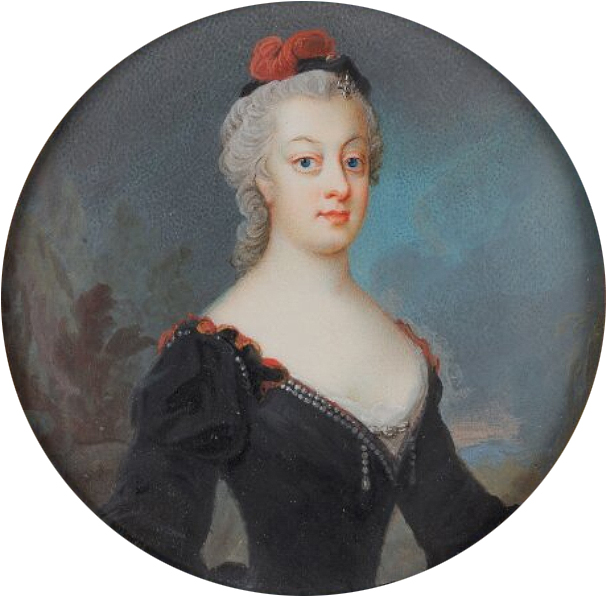
Portrait of Catharina Charlotta Taube by Olof Arenius, c. 1735–1766.

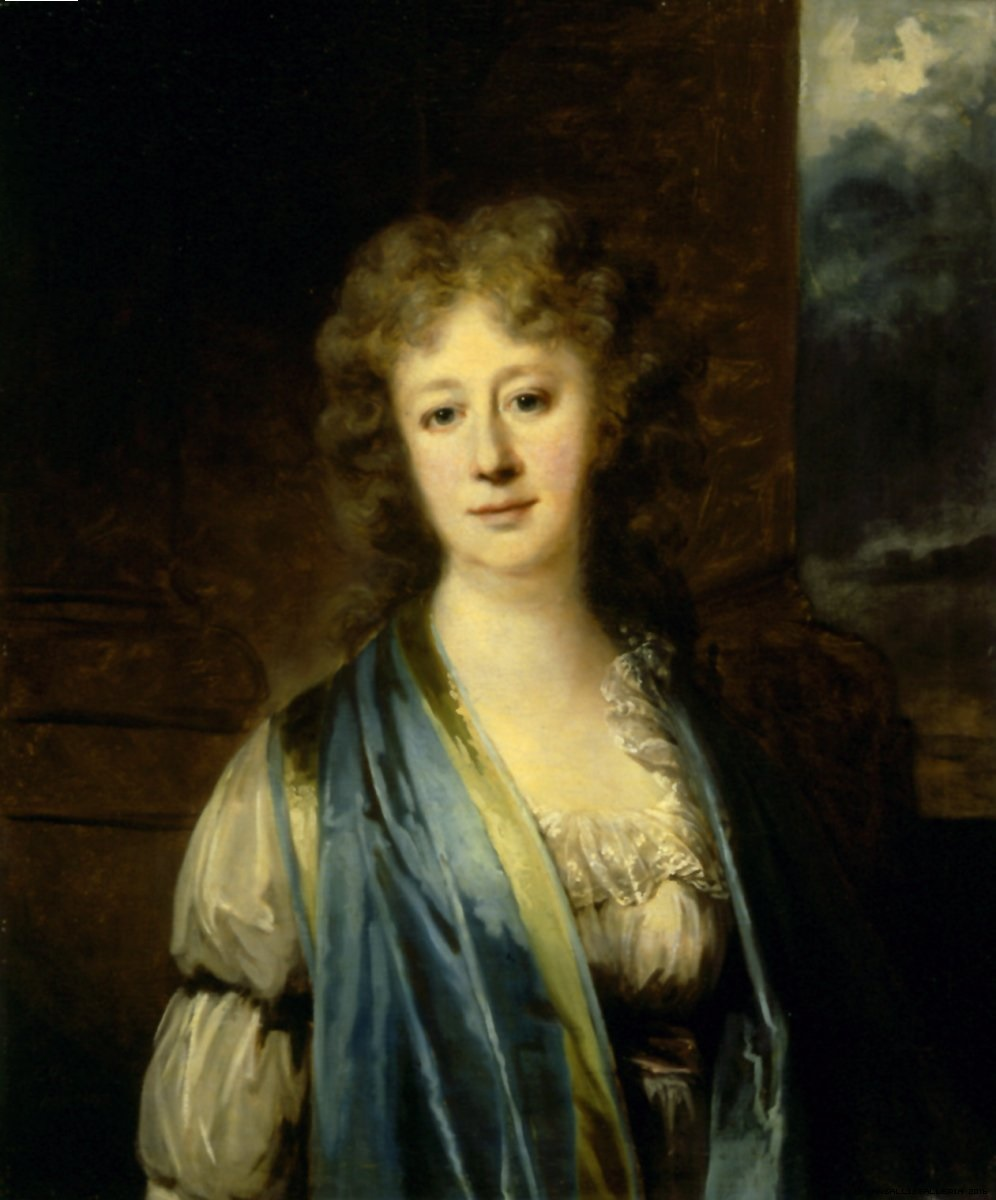
Portrait of Hedvig Eva Rålamb by Carl Fredric von Breda, 1798.

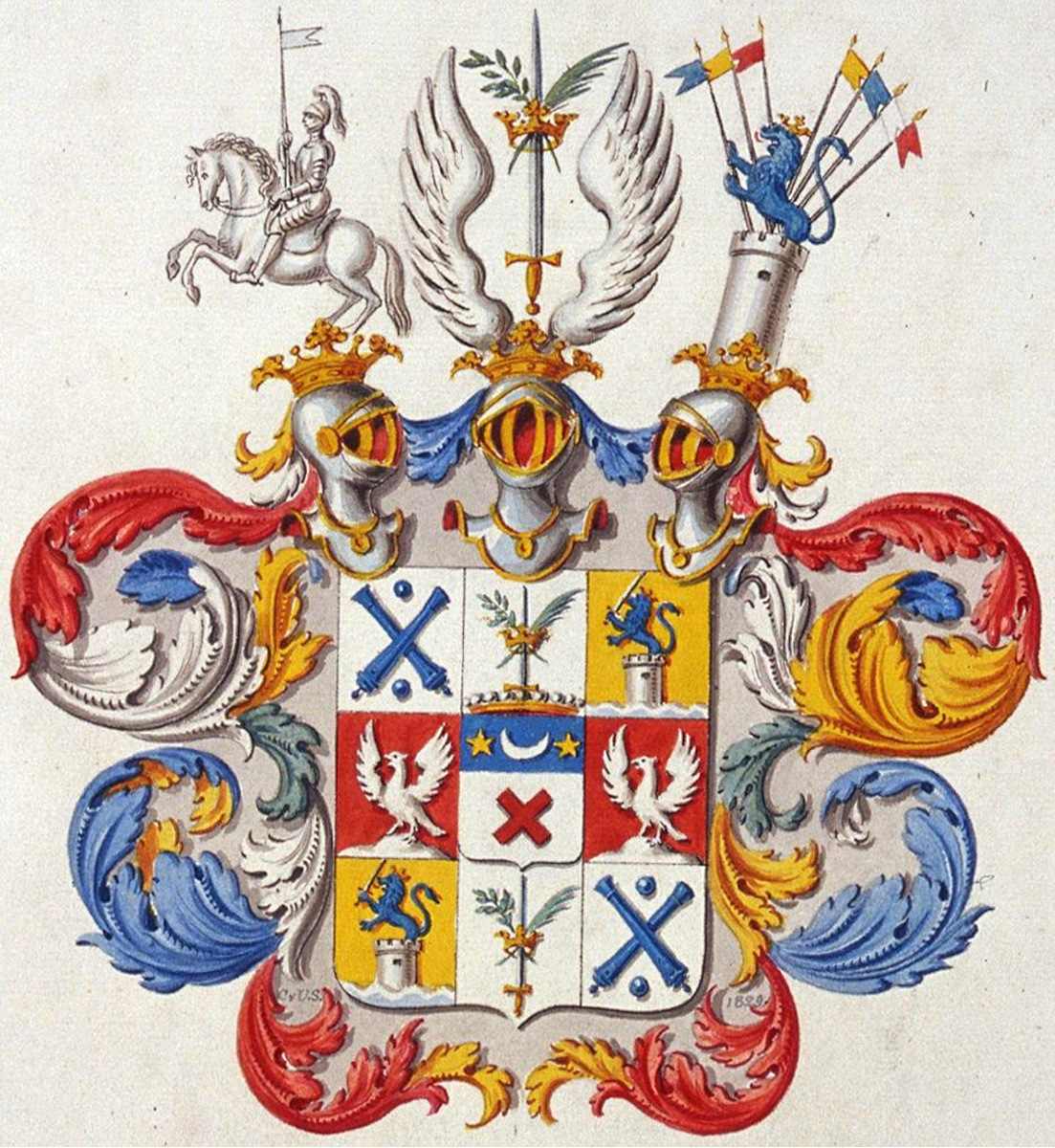
Greater coat of arms of the comital family of De la Gardie, 19th century.

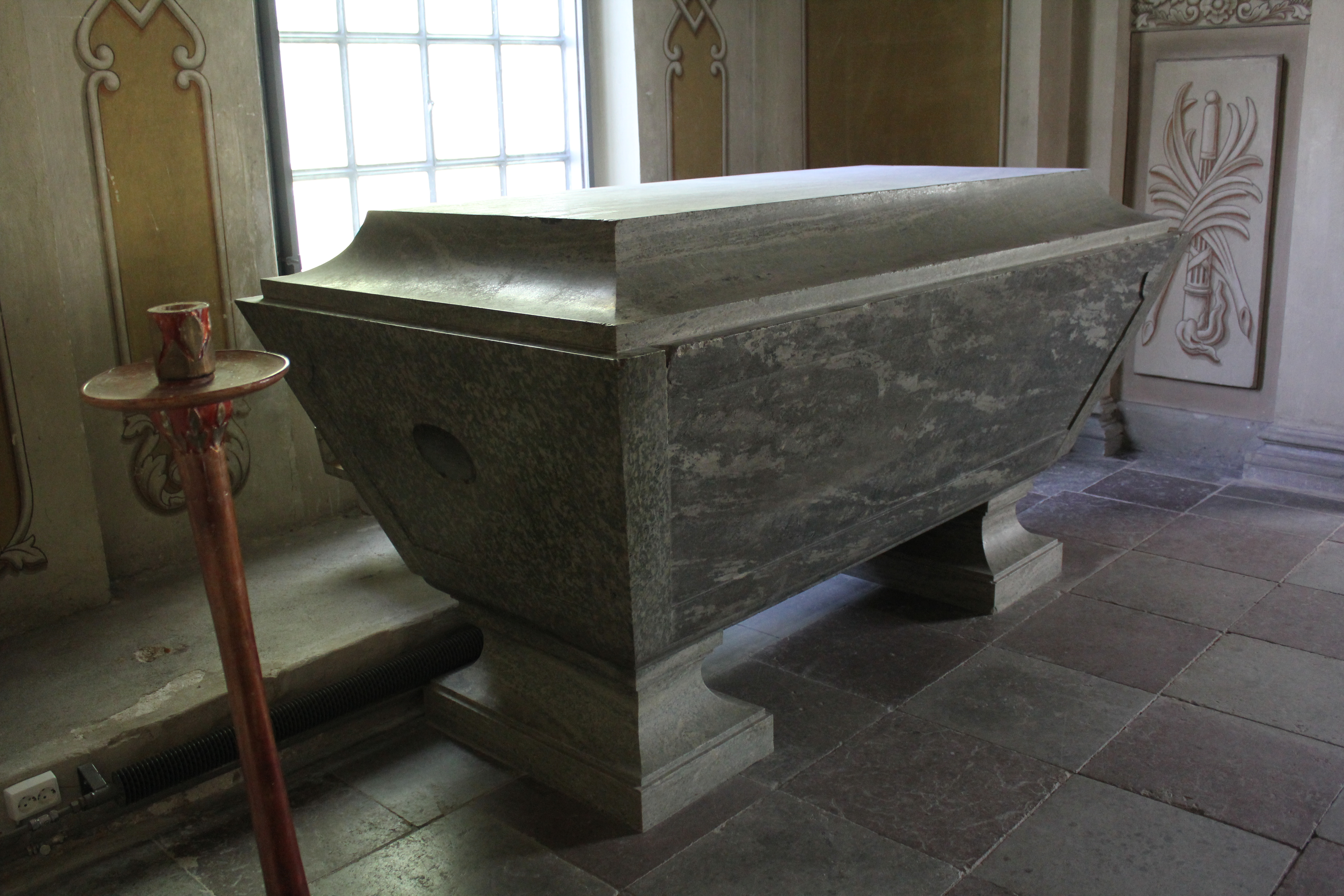
Tomb of De la Gardie within the Veckholm Church, May 2011.
