= Ljung Castle =

Building in Sweden

- Linköping Municipality, Sweden
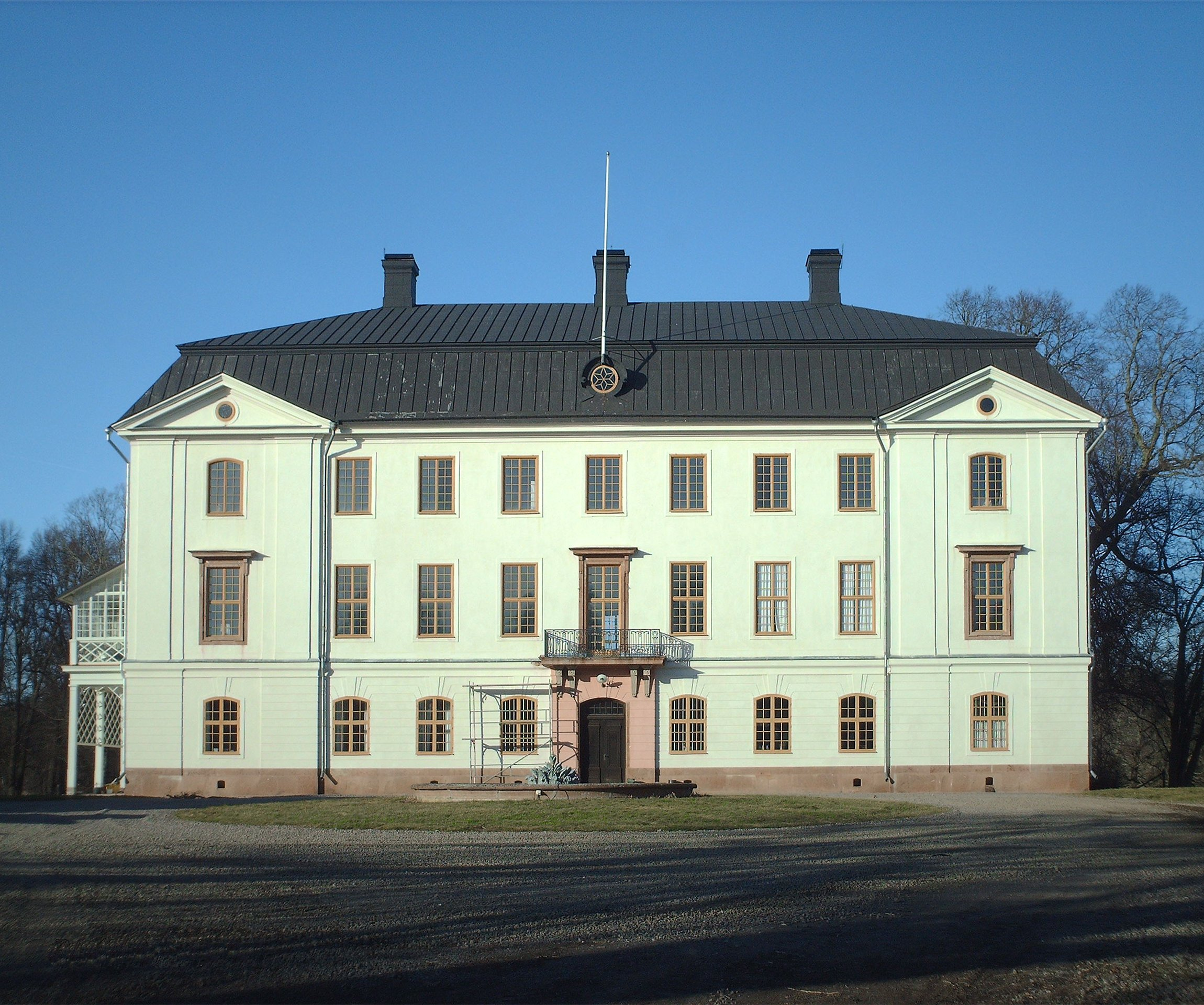

Site information
- Type: Castle

Location
- Coordinates: 58°31′42″N 15°26′37″E

Ljung Castle is a castle in Sweden. The present building was erected in 1774. It was commissioned by Axel von Fersen the Elder and designed by Jean Eric Rehn. The building is well preserved and regarded a good example of the style of the Gustavian era. The castle belongs to the Listed buildings in Sweden since 1989.

== History ==
Ljung is noted as a property of no consequence in the early 17th-century. It was bought by baron H. Hamilton in 1642. In 1665, it was bought by the famous writer Agneta Horn (1629–1672).

It was bought by the von Fersen family in 1730. It was owned by the von Fersen family until 1838, and during that time owned by Axel von Fersen the Elder, Hedvig Catharina von Fersen, the famous Axel von Fersen the Younger, Fabian Reinhold von Fersen until the von Fersen family died out in 1839 and Ljung was inherited by Louise von Fersen (1816–1879) and her spouse Carl Gyldenstolpe, who lost in their famous bankruptcy, after it was sold on public auction in 1868. It was bought by Claes von Mecklenburg (d. 1890). It was owned by a consortium from 1908, who divided up the land to various owners.

Eva Dickson was raised here.

== See also ==
- List of castles in Sweden
