= Hedda Piper =

Swedish courtwoman

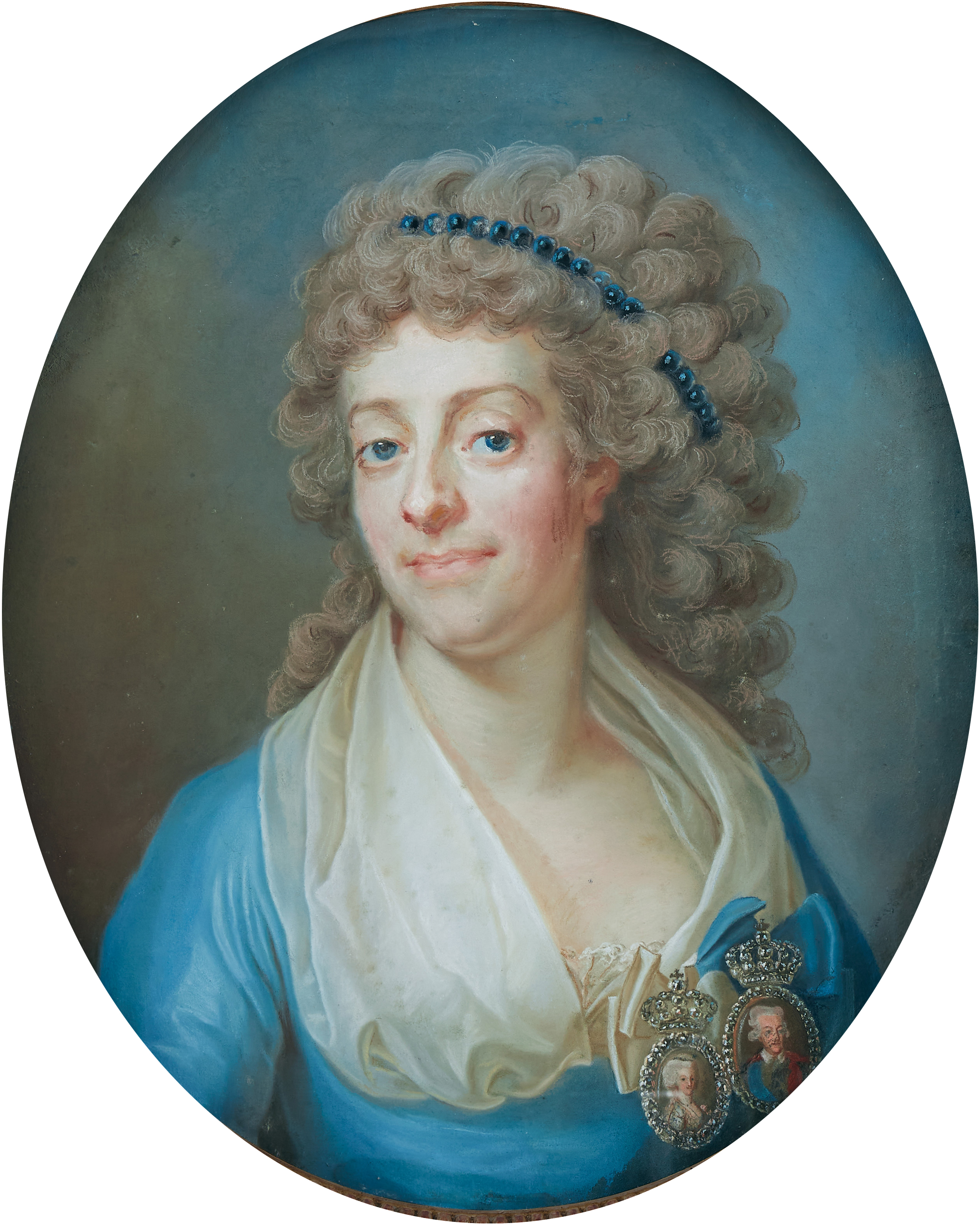
Lundberg - Hedvig Katarina Piper

Hedvig "Hedda" Catharina Piper née Ekeblad (1746–1812) was a Swedish courtier; överhovmästarinna (Mistress of the Robes) to the queen of Sweden, Frederica of Baden, from 1795 to 1805.

Born to count Claes Ekeblad the Younger and Eva Ekeblad, she married count Carl Gustaf Piper in 1769.

The marriage was unhappy because of the homosexual love affair between her husband and his manservant Beck, "as she daily finds herself compromised by his manservant, has no voice to command in her own house" because Beck: "embarrassed her in every way. She was even forced to personally buy food for her last child, as she couldn't even order broth in her own kitchen without being contradicted by The Beck", and the love affair between Beck and her spouse continued to be one of the scandals of the era until Beck's death in 1788, when it was said that "she did miss him in some aspects, as he did take her side in some rows. For her children he did anything, and as his authority was so great he was a powerful ally to have." It is noted that the famed Sophie Hagman was employed as a maid in her household prior to becoming the mistress of Prince Frederick Adolph.

Hedda Piper served as statsfru (Lady of the Bedchamber) to the queen from 1774 to '80, and was appointed hovmästarinna (Deputy Mistress of the Robes) under Charlotta Sparre in 1780. As Sparre was usually indisposed, Piper performed the actual duties of the office for fifteen years before she formally succeeded Sparre in her official role as överhovmästarinna in 1795.

Duchess Charlotte portrays her in her famous journal as quite pretty but uneducated, arrogant, unable to keep anything in confidence or control her temperament, and claims that she became disliked at court because of her way of handling her office during her service to Frederica of Baden, queen consort of Sweden.

After the arrival of Frederica in Sweden in 1797, Hedda Piper was blamed for having contributed to the new queen's difficulty to adjust to her new home country by claiming that it was against the etiquette for the queen to speak to anyone unless encouraged to do so by her head lady-in-waiting (Piper), which was in fact not at all in accordance with court protocol, and served to make the queen socially isolated and dependent upon Piper. Reportedly, the queen also complained to Charlotte that Piper treated the younger ladies-in-waiting too severely. However, Piper, in collaboration with the king's confidant Fabian Wrede, also contributed to establishing reconciliation between the king and the queen during their initial difficulty in getting to know each other. She was replaced by Louise von Fersen in 1805.

Court offices
Preceded by Charlotta Sparre	Överhovmästarinna to the Queen of Sweden; 1795–1805	Succeeded by Louise von Fersen
