= Steninge Palace =

Manor house near Lake Mälaren in Sweden

Coordinates: 59°36′07″N 17°48′16″E

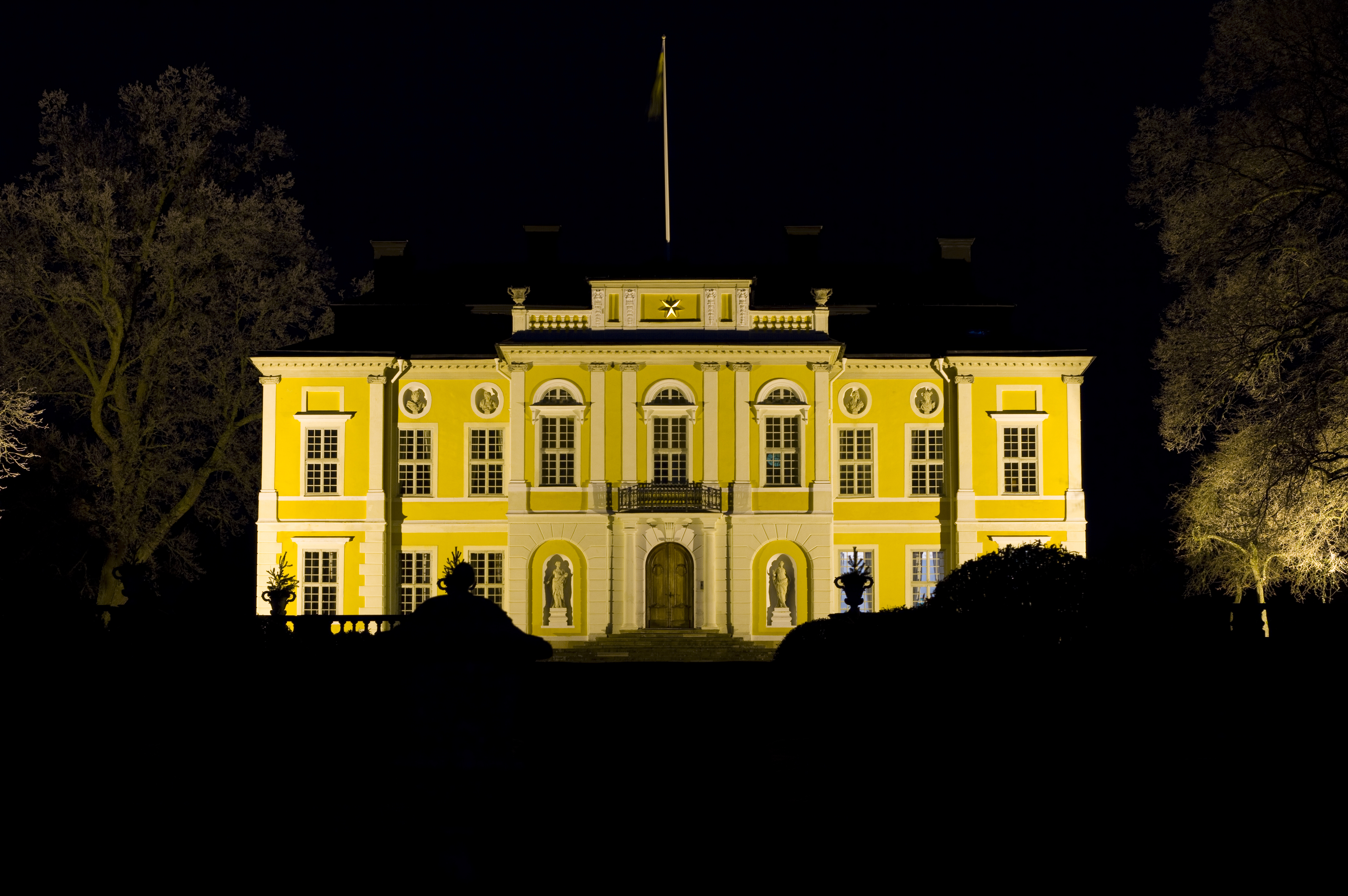
Steninge Palace at Night.

Steninge Palace (also known as Steninge Manor) is a Baroque palace overlooking Lake Mälaren near Märsta outside of Stockholm, Sweden. Built 1694–1698 to the design of architect Nicodemus Tessin the Younger, the palace is directly inspired by Château de Vaux-le-Vicomte in France, and has a reputation in Sweden as one of the most elegant examples of Baroque mansions. Steninge Palace was completed in 1705.

The estate has a history dating back to the 13th century and has seen many owners, but two families have strongly influenced the premises: those of Carl Gyllenstierna (1649–1735) and Axel von Fersen. Today the palace is privately owned by a company which keeps it accessible for visitors: Steninge Palace Cultural Centre.

== History ==
In the end of 1200 the first known settlement was established at Steninge. In 1667 Carl Gyllenstierna inherited the Steninge Estate. 1680-81 the well known Swedish architect Nicodemus Tessin was commissioned to design the palace and the two wings. In 1705 Steninge Palace was completed. In 1706 Carl Gyllenstierna married and gave Steninge Palace as a wedding gift to his bride, Anna Soop.

In 1735 the Fersen family bought Steninge. In 1747 Steninge was made a trust. In 1810 Axel von Fersen was murdered. A monument of Fersen was erected at Steninge in 1813. Steninge was inherited by his brother Fabian Reinhold von Fersen and then by his nephew Axel von Fersen (1798–1838). When Axel von Fersen died in 1838, the von Fersen family died out and Steninge was inherited by his sister Louise von Fersen and her spouse Carl August Gyldenstolpe, who lost it during their famous bankruptcy in 1867. In 1873 Baron von Otter bought Steninge and a stone barn was built west of the palace.

In 1970 G.B.A. Holm bought Steninge and employs the architect I.G. Clason to carry out a restoration work. In 1923, Hanna Lindmark bought Steninge Palace. In 1932 Steninge Palace was bought by Wolfgang Thomas, son of the US ambassador in Sweden. In 1969 Steninge Palace was declared a listed building. In 1976 a family with the common name Andersson bought Steninge. In 1979 the large stone barn was declared a listed building. In 1997 Linn and Atle Brynestad (CG Holding) bought Steninge. In 1999, the Steninge Palace Cultural centre opened. In 2009 Steninge Palace and the stone barn were bought by Gelba fastigheter.

== Gallery ==
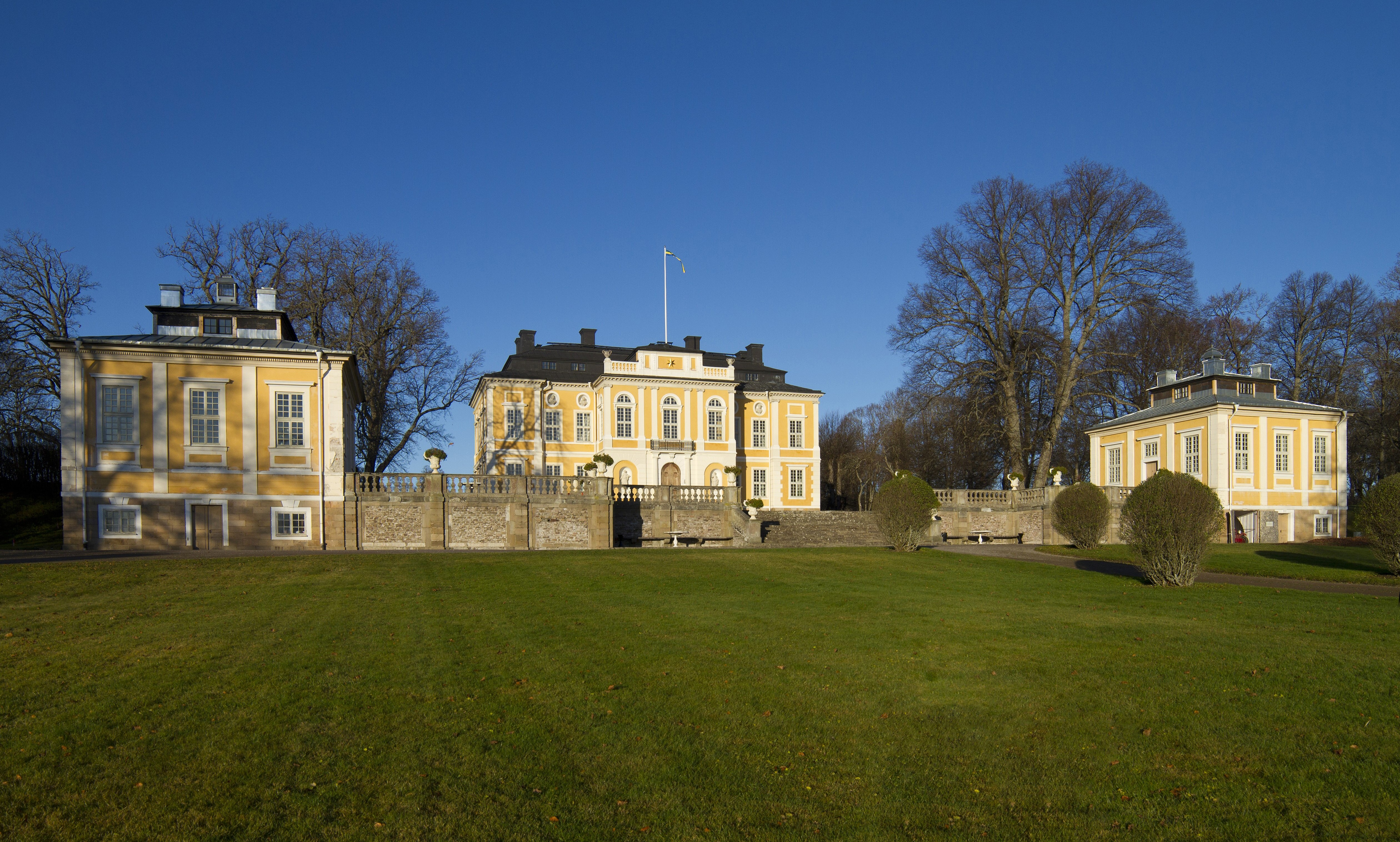
Steninge Palace.

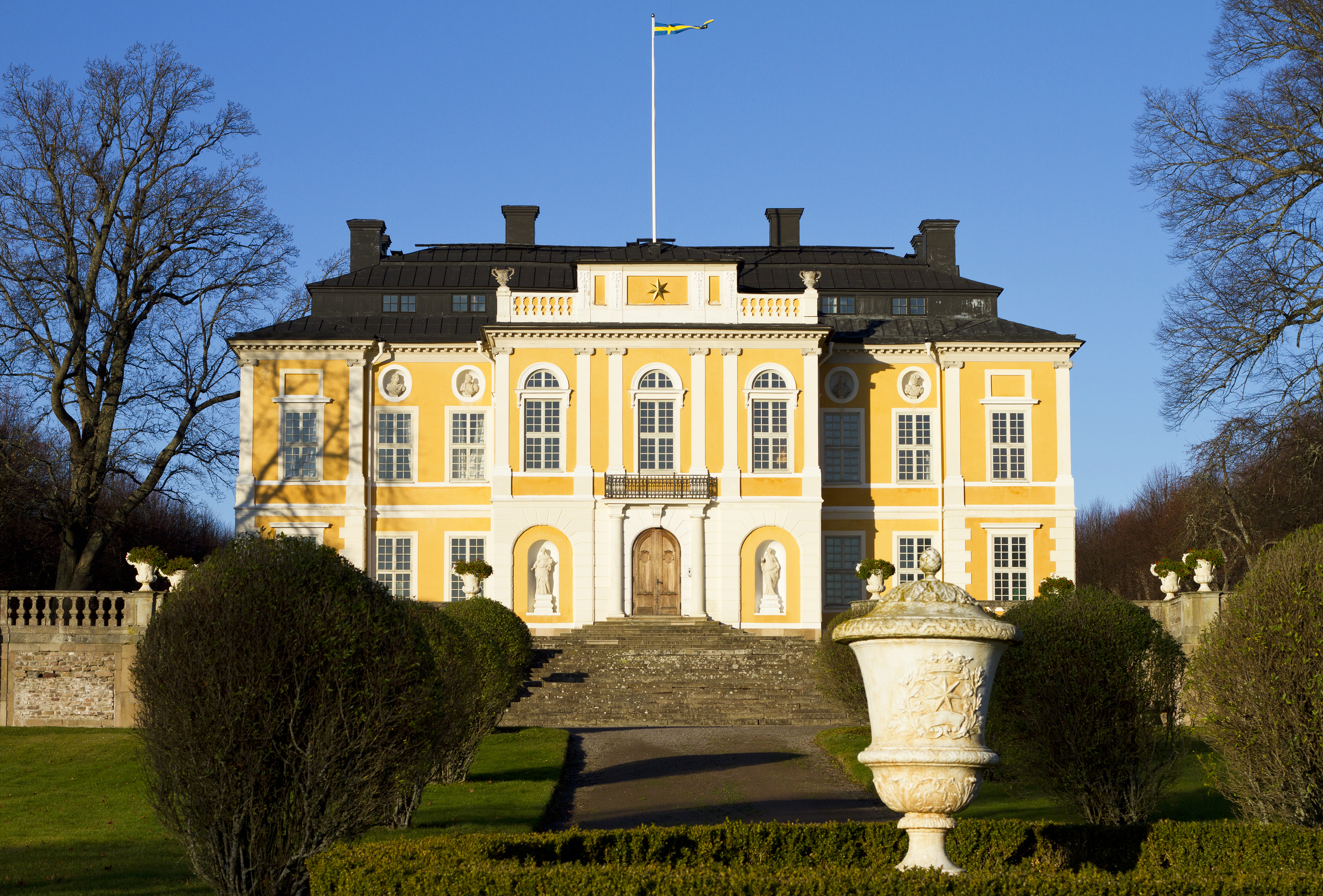
Steninge Palace main building.

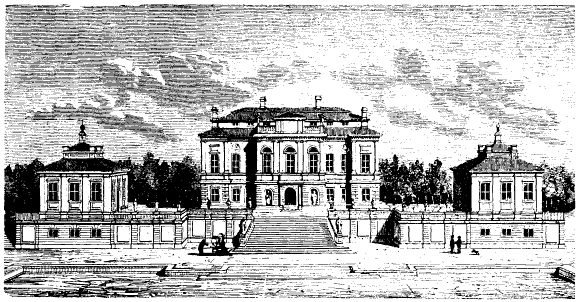
Engraving from Nordisk familjebok showing the palace in 1694.

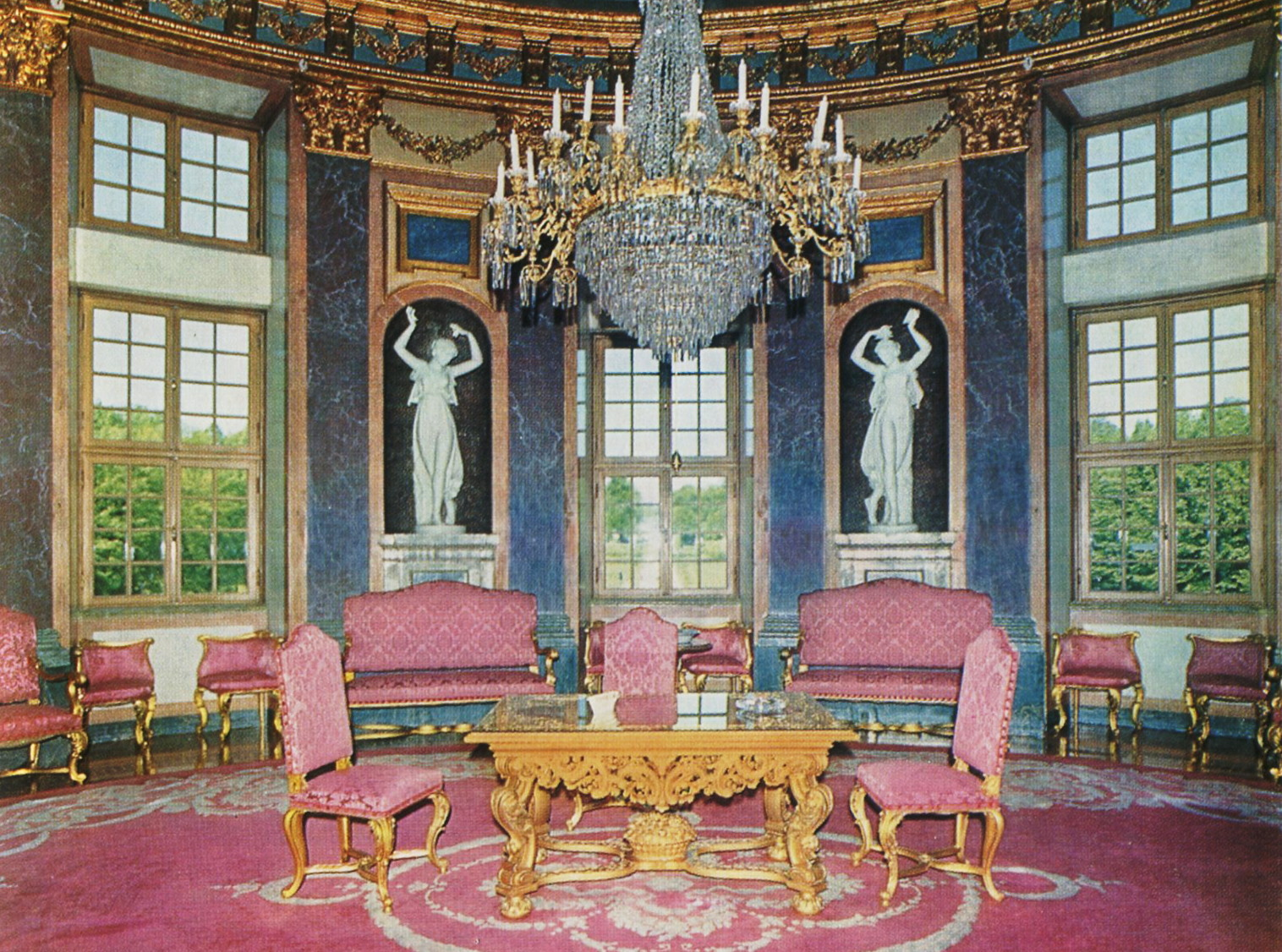
The Oval Salon

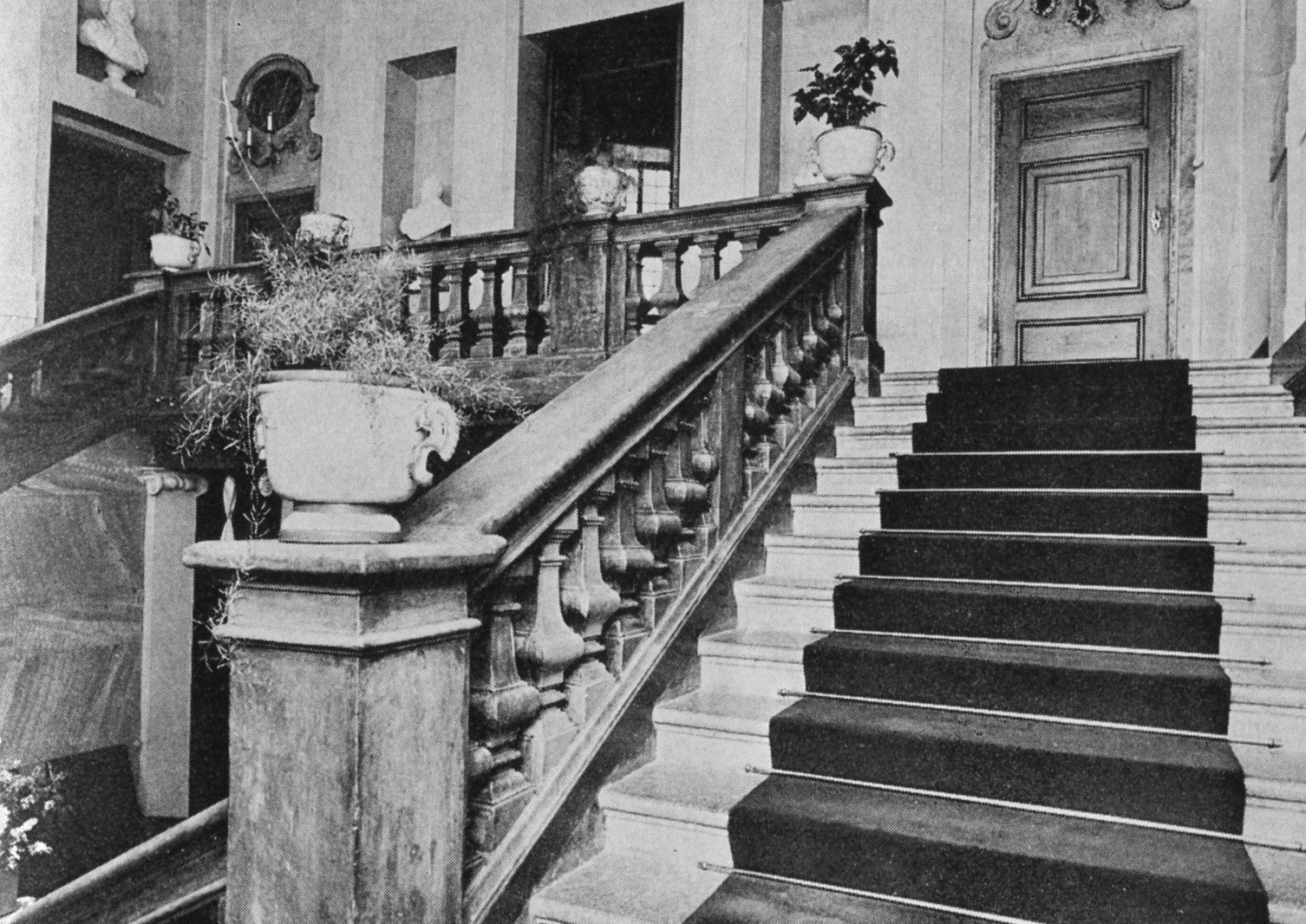
Main staircase
