= Axel von Fersen =

Axel von Fersen may refer to:

- Axel von Fersen the Elder (1719–1794), Swedish statesman and soldier
- Axel von Fersen the Younger (1755–1810), Swedish Army officer, diplomat and statesman, son of the Elder
