= Fabian von Fersen (1762–1818) =

Swedish count, politician, officer and courtier

Count Fabian Reinhold von Fersen (7 October 1762, Stockholm – 10 March 1818, Stockholm) was a Swedish count, politician, officer and courtier. He was the son of Axel von Fersen the Elder and Hedvig Catharina De la Gardie and the brother of Count Axel von Fersen the Younger, Hedvig Eleonora von Fersen and Sophie Piper.

== Life ==
Fabian von Fersen served in the Royal Life Guards from 1771 and 1796 and climbed through the ranks from an ensign to a lieutenant colonel. In 1793–1802, he was a Valet de chambre and in 1802–10 a Chamberlain (office) at the royal court. He served as a member of the nobility in the riksdag several times between 1789 and 1818.

In 1796, he belonged to the entourage accompanying Gustav IV Adolf on the king's marriage trip to Russia. Before the deposition of Gustav IV Adolf during the Coup of 1809, he prevented the monarch from the withdrawal of funds from the national bank. He participated in the funeral procession of Charles August later that same year. At that occasion, his brother Count Axel von Fersen the Younger was murdered in a riot suspected of having poisoned Carl August, and Fabian and his sister Sophie were also targeted by the mob as known followers of the Gustavian Party. In 1810, he belonged to the entourage welcoming the elected heir to the throne, Charles August, Crown Prince of Sweden, upon his arrival to Sweden. Fabian von Fersen demanded that the paper of his murdered brother be sealed, and him and his wife (at that point mistress of the Robes of the queen), both left court.

Fabian von Fersen has been given various descriptions in contemporary diaries and memoirs. Hedvig Ulrika De la Gardie, whose interests in Sweden he protected when her spouse was exiled for treason, describes him as noble et généreux, and Anders Fredrik Skjöldebrand said of him that he had: "many good qualities, such as a pure and open personality, honesty and reliability, but also the haughty bearing of his family in his way of interaction".

=== Private life ===
Fabian von Fersen is known to have been the long-term lover of the royal Duchess Charlotte. The affair is assumed to have started in the late 1780s. It was rumored at the time that the pregnancy which ended in a miscarriage of the Duchess in 1792 was caused by Fabian von Fersen. The affair was discontinued with the marriage of von Fersen in 1797.

He married countess Louise Piper (1777–1849), maid of honor to Princess Sophia Albertine of Sweden, in 1797. Their children: Axel von Fersen (1798–1838), Fabian von Fersen (1800-1800), Gustaf Hans von Fersen (1802–1839) and the great heiress Louise von Fersen (1816–1879), of whom all sons died officially childless (although Gustaf Hans had in fact several children with Carolina Brunström), were the last of the von Fersen family.
