= Charlotte Lindmark =

Swedish ballet dancer and stage actress

Charlotte Lindmark (18 October 1819 in Stockholm – 2 April 1858 in Stockholm) was a Swedish ballet dancer and stage actress. She was regarded a member of the Royal Swedish Ballet in 1834–39, and engaged as a stage actress at the Royal Dramatic Theatre (1842–45) and the Mindre teatern (1845–58) in Stockholm. She enjoyed great popularity and was one of the most famed actresses in Sweden in the mid-19th century.

== Life ==
Charlotte Lindmark was the daughter of a poor milliner. She made her stage debut in the Children's theater of Anders Selinder. She became a student of the Royal Swedish Ballet in 1829 and ballerina in 1834. She was a popular and talented ballerina, but was affected by gout to such a degree that she was forced to retire in 1839. She made her debut as an actress at the Royal Dramatic Theatre, and was regarded to have displayed good talent, but was not considered to live up to the expectations.

From 1845 until her death, she was engaged as an actress at the Mindre teatern, a theater more frequented by the wider public than the royal stage and where she enjoyed great and widespread popularity among both audience and critics. Among her most noted roles where the title role of Drottning Kristina ('Queen Christina') by Jeanette Granberg and the title role of Narcisse Rameau in which it was said that "M:ll Lindmark dies divine".

However, Charlotte Lindmark suffered severely from deteriorating health in parallel to her stage success, but still continued to work hard despite her activity contributing to her illness, which was described by J. C. Hellberg:

"She may have been the only one, who could cry onstage without pretend. She never allowed her own person shine through her character, she always kept the :child's enthusiasm for everything sweet, the fresh feelings of a child's mind. During all this she combated her constantly increasing bodily torments, so great :that she, when leaving the stage, often collapsed on the closest empty chair and the doctor declared it a wonder that she could live and act. Such a life!"

Charlotte Lindmark died of "chest pains" on the top of a very successful career in 1858.
