= Charlotta Sparre =

Swedish noble and courtier

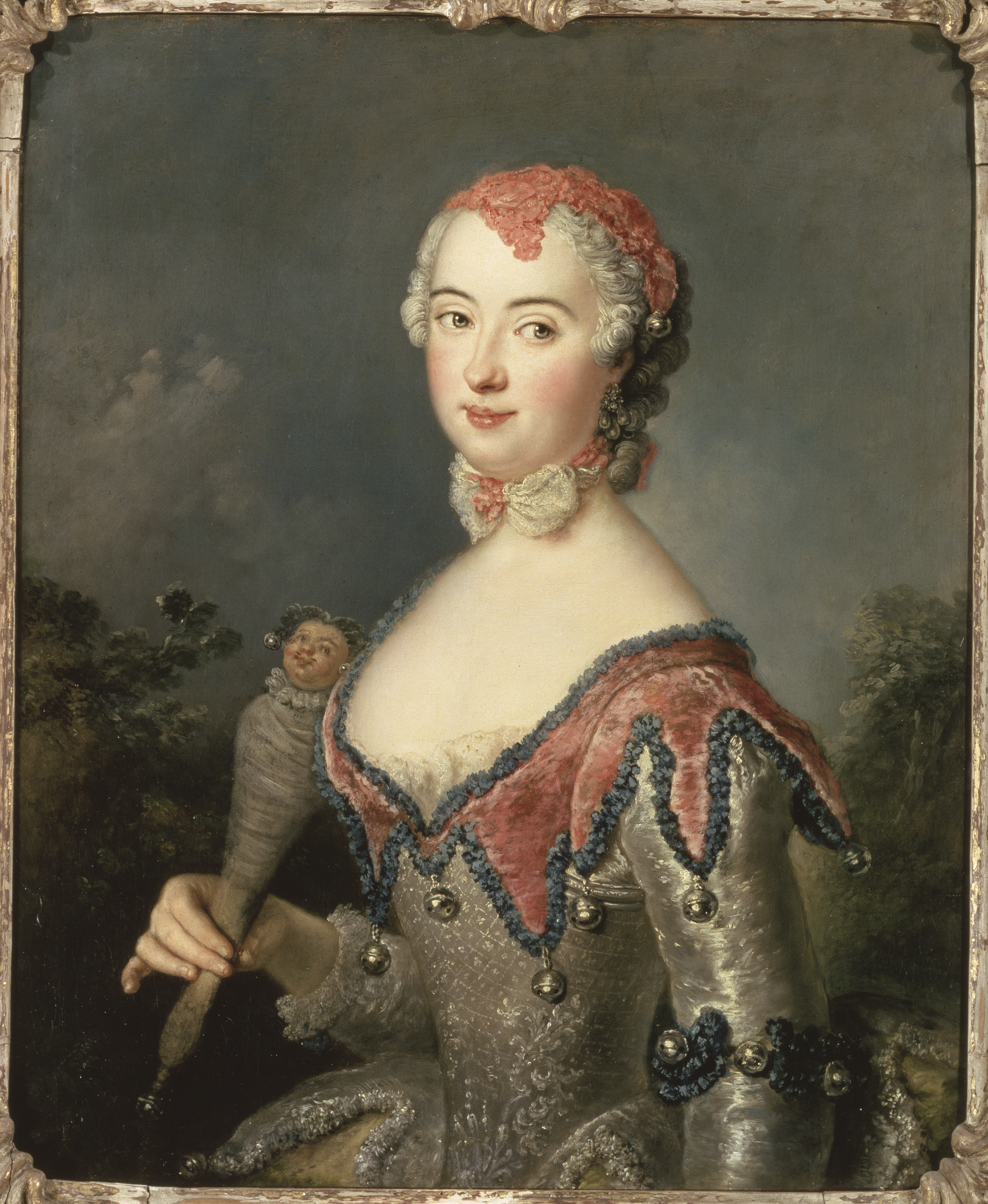
Charlotta Sparre by Antoine Pesne (1744).

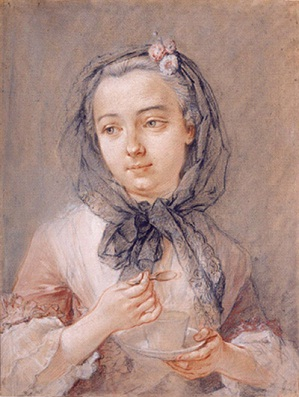
Charlotta Sparre by François Boucher, 1741.

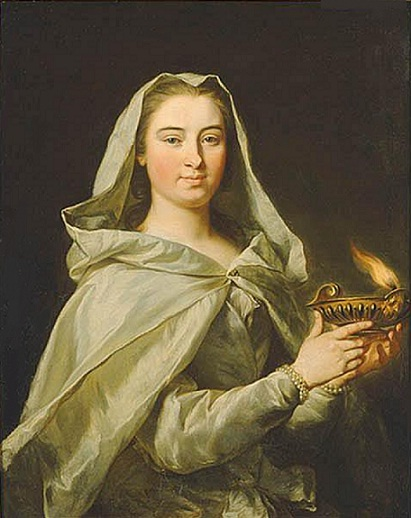
Charlotta Fredrika Sparre as vestal (1741)

Charlotta Fredrika Sparre (1719 – 20 December 1795) was a Swedish noble and courtier who was Chief Court Mistress to Queen Sophia Magdalena.

== Life ==
=== Early life ===
Charlotta Sparre, commonly known as Lotta, was the daughter of Baron Fredrik Henrik Sparre and Virginia Christina Lilliehöök af Fårdala. She was introduced at court at the age of twelve, where she was appointed hovfröken (maid-of-honor) to Queen Ulrika Eleonora of Sweden.

Her beauty made her famous at the royal French court at Versailles, where she was known as “la charmante rose” when she stayed in France from 1739 to 1742 with her relative Ulla Sparre, the wife of Count Carl Gustaf Tessin. She also followed Tessin to Berlin, where Prince Augustus William of Prussia is reported to have fallen in love with her.

On 18 February 1748 she married royal Crown Forester Count Carl Reinhold von Fersen and became the mother of Ulla von Höpken and Augusta von Fersen. During her stay in Paris, she studied dance under Marie Sallé, which she in turn taught her daughters, who were to become famous for the grace and talent within dance in the amateur theatre of Gustav III.

=== Maid of honor ===
Sparre was, with the Count and Countess Tessin, a part of the entourage which accompanied Louisa Ulrika of Prussia from Prussia to Sweden upon her marriage to the Swedish Crown Prince Adolph Fredrik in 1744, and she served as a maid of honor to Louisa Ulrika from 1744 to 1748.

During her tenure as maid of honor, she and her future spouse were described as the first stars of the amateur theatre of the royal court, which consisted of amateur actors from the court nobility, and who performed French plays at court from the autumn of 1744 until at last the Du Londel Troupe arrived in 1753.

=== Lady-in-waiting ===
She served as överhovmästarinna to the next Swedish Crown Princess and Queen, Sophia Magdalena of Denmark, consort of Gustav III of Sweden, from 1767 until 1795: first as sub-mistress under Anna Maria Hjärne and Ulrika Strömfelt and formally as head mistress of the robes from 1780; Hjärne and Strömfelt only officiated during larger ceremonies, while Sparre was in service during everyday life. During the summers of 1767 and 1768, she tried to reconcile the Crown Prince couple to consummate their marriage at Ekolsund Castle, which first seemed successful, but eventually failed. During these attempts, she blamed the Crown Prince for his infatuation with Charlotte Du Rietz.

Hedvig Elisabeth Charlotte of Holstein-Gottorp described Sparre's spouse was frivolous, and Sparre herself as a pleasing but eccentric and lazy character, and not one to meddle in intrigues. She was present at the baptism of the Crown Prince in 1778 and at the delivery of the Queen in 1782. However, Sparre's health and increasing weight caused her to spend more and more time in retirement in her rooms, and her appointment as courtier had become a mere formality when she eventually lost the position in 1795, which made her daughters leave court in solidarity with her. She was succeeded in her post by Countess Hedvig Catharina Piper, who had already served informally in this capacity for fifteen years.

Sparre died in Stockholm.

== Notes ==
Court offices
| Preceded by Ulrika Strömfelt | Överhovmästarinna to the Queen of Sweden; 1780–1795 | Succeeded by Hedvig Catharina Piper |
