= Johan Henrik Scheffel =

Swedish artist (1690–1781)

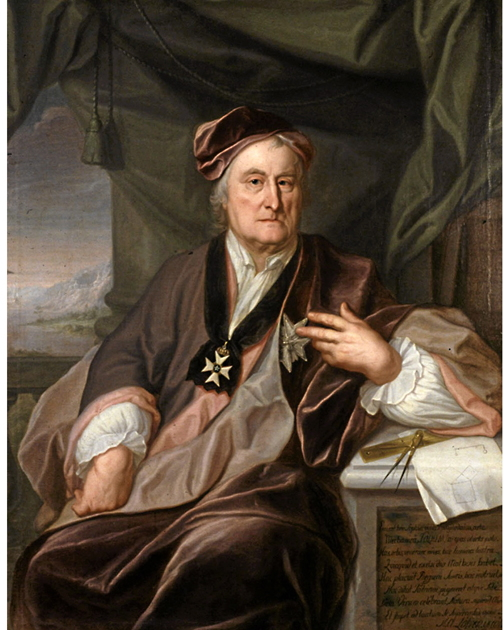
Portrait of Christopher Polhem by Johan Henrik Scheffel, 1741

Johan Henrik Scheffel (9 April 1690 – 21 December 1781) was a Swedish artist. He became known for his portraits of Carl von Linné, Christopher Polhem and Hedvig Charlotta Nordenflycht.
