= Jeanna von Lantingshausen =

Johanna "Jeanna" von Lantingshausen, née von Stockenström, (1753–1809), was a Swedish noble and courtier. She is foremost known as the instigator of the political demonstration by the noblewomen toward Gustav III in opposition of his parliamentary act of 1789.

== Life ==
She was the daughter of Riksråd count Erik von Stockenström and Johanna Bedoire and was married in 1777 to Baron Albrekt von Lantingshausen. Johanna von Lantingshausen was a popular socialite and known for her performances within the amateur theater of Gustav III of Sweden: she was formerly a maid of honor to Sophia Magdalena of Denmark and a personal friend of Hedwig Elizabeth Charlotte of Holstein-Gottorp. She was also a personal friend of Gustav III of Sweden: at Gripsholm Castle in the winter of 1776, for example, it is mentioned how she, the King and Hedvig Eleonora von Fersen persuaded Johan Gabriel Oxenstierna, Lewenhaupt and Adolf Ludvig Hamilton to join them in the prank to awake the sleeping courtiers from bed at night by surprising them in their beds.

=== Conflict with the monarch ===
At the stormy Assembly of the Estates in 1789, were Gustav III needed the support to continue the ongoing Russo-Swedish war, the monarch came into open conflict with the nobility, which was in opposition to the war and the Union and Security Act: he used the other estates to defeat the nobility and had many representatives of the nobility placed in house arrest and imprisoned. This caused a break between Gustav III and the nobility, and it was demonstrated by a social boycott of him led by the female members of the aristocracy: the noblewomen made a political demonstration of their opinions by turning down all private invitations and socializing with him in his capacity of a private person: they demonstrated by visiting the Princesses, Hedwig Elizabeth Charlotte of Holstein-Gottorp and Sophie Albertine of Sweden, who were also known to be in opposition to Gustav III, while at the same time turning down his invitations. Jeanna von Lantingshausen was the leader of this political demonstration of female nobles, and is reported to have been the instigator of it. Gustav III took deep offence of their "Fronde"-making and likened the noblewomen's way of political demonstration to the "hags" of the French Revolution and said himself to fear that they would storm him at the Gustav III's Pavilion as the Women's March on Versailles. He replied to their demonstration by writing and performing a play in which Johanna von Lantingshausen was publicly mocked. According to Elis Schröderheim, this demonstration made Gustav III lose his former friends, and to spend more time with his male favorites such as Georg Johan De Besche, in which he indulged in ill-reputed orgies with prostitutes. The demonstration also led to a conflict with the Queen in the autumn of 1790. That autumn, the King chose to remain in the summer residence of Drottningholm Palace well in to the autumn because of the social boycott. Finally, the Queen returned to the capital without his consent, which made him accuse her of having been manipulated by the oppositional of the female courtiers to participate in the political demonstration and refusing him the company of her ladies-in-waiting by leaving.

This conflict ended by a demonstration of power from the monarch: he wished to set an example, and Jeanna von Lantingshausen was chosen to play this part as the leader of the whole demonstration. In 1790, Gustav III had her officially banished from court and all places in which it was possible for her to come in contact with members of the royal house, such as the Royal Swedish Opera. Johanna von Lantingshausen asked for a formal instruction to be sent and read to her by an official, and this instruction was thereafter read to her in her by police official Nils Henric Liljensparre, who read it to her in her salon where she had her guests gathered as witnesses. This event is mentioned in many contemporary memoirs, letters and diaries and regarded as a scandal, particularly as it was read by Liljensparre, who normally arrested prostitutes, and it contributed to the unpopularity and aristocratic opposition toward Gustav III during his last years as monarch. Her banishment lasted until the death of Gustav III.

== In fiction ==
Jeanna von Lantingshausen is portrayed in the novel Pottungen (Chamber pot child) by Anna Laestadius Larsson from 2014, where she, alongside Ulrika Pasch, Anna Maria Lenngren, Ulrika Widström, Marianne Ehrenström and Sophie von Fersen, becomes a member in a Blue Stockings Society organized by Hedvig Elisabeth Charlotte of Holstein-Gottorp.
