= Anna Maria Lenngren =

Swedish writer (1754–1817)

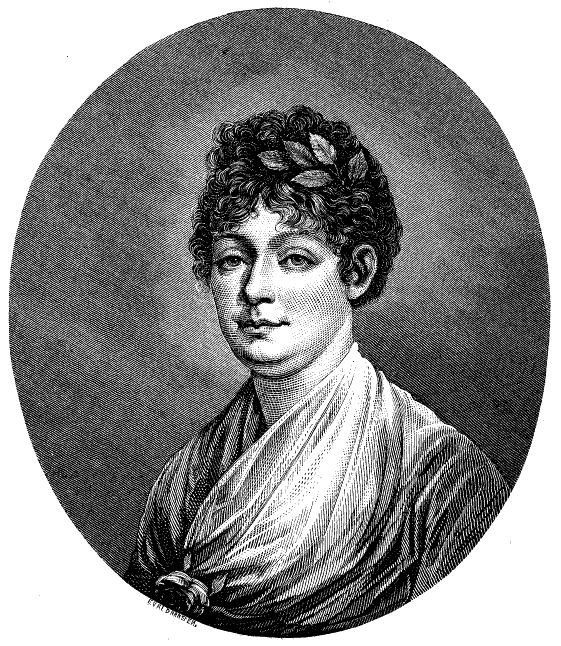
- Born: 18 June 1754; Uppsala, Sweden
- Died: 8 March 1817 (aged 62); Stockholm, Sweden
- Occupations: Writer, poet and translator
- Known for: writer, poet, and salonist
- Spouse(s): Carl Peter Lenngren; one adopted child

Anna Maria Lenngren (née Malmstedt; 18 June 1754 – 8 March 1817) was one of the most famous poets in Swedish history. Her father and brother were also poets.

One of her best-known poems is Några ord till min kära dotter, ifall jag hade någon ("Advice to my dear daughter, if I had one"). She also wrote about Sweden's class system in the satirical poems against snobbery Hans nåds morgonsömn ("His Grace's morning snooze") and Grevinnans besök ("The Countess's visit").

== Life ==
=== Early life ===
Anna Maria Lenngren was born in Uppsala as the daughter of the poet Magnus Brynolf Malmstedt (1724–1798), a professor in Latin at Uppsala University, and Märta Johanna Florin (d. 1788). Her father was a member of the Moravian Church and was known for his social work; from 1772, he hosted a school for poor children in his home. Both her parents published hymns, and her brother Johan Magnus (1749–80) wrote secular poems.

Anna Maria Lenngren became set against religion and in favor of the realism of the Age of Enlightenment through dislike of her father's passionate religious feelings; but her humanism and passion for social justice have also been attributed to her father's influence. In her social views, she felt sympathy for the working classes, opposed the privileges of the nobility and acted as a spokesperson for the "third estate", idealizing a simple and humble life style.

Her father observed her talent early on, and stated that he wished to "make of her not only a literary, but a learned woman". He gave her an advanced education, and she was tutored at home in Latin and the Classics of antiquity. Her favorite poet was Horace.

=== Early career ===
She began her career in poetry with reviews, epitomes, epigrams and translations in the 1770s. Among her earliest works were interpretations of Horace, published anonymously in the press. In 1772, she published her first poem under her own name, the funeral poem På mademoiselle Anna Lovisa Pahls saliga hemfärds dag, den 14 Maji 1772, die Corona. In 1774–77, she frequently wrote for Anna Hammar-Rosén's paper Hwad Nytt?? Hwad Nytt??.

In 1776 she was commissioned by Duke Charles, the King of Sweden's brother, for a translation of the French operetta Lucile, the first French operetta translated into Swedish. In its introduction, she defended women's right to intellectual work. It was a success: Lenngren was awarded a golden clock as a token of appreciation by the royal Duchess Charlotte, and was given several similar translation commissions by the royal house.

Lenngren enjoyed great success: already in 1774, she was inducted into a literary society in Uppsala, earned good reviews and poetic tributes in the press, became known as a defender of intellectual women, and referred to herself as a "litterata". She became a member of the Royal Society of Sciences and Letters in Gothenburg in 1775, and of the Utile Dulci in 1779. She was one of only three women members of the Utile Dulci, the others being Anna Charlotta von Stapelmohr and Anna Brita Wendelius. In 1777, she repeated her demand in favor of women's right to intellectual pursuits in Thé-conseillen.

=== Married life ===
In 1780, she married the official Carl Peter Lenngren (1750–1827). He was the chief editor of Stockholms-Posten, which the famous poet and critic Johan Henric Kellgren and he published. Kellgren worked with Lenngren on several assignments from 1778 onwards, reportedly providing her with inspiration, and sharing an interest in the ideas of Voltaire. She published poems and prose in Stockholms-Posten from 1778 onwards, but after her wedding, she only published anonymously, stopping altogether by the end of the 1780s.

Her marriage caused a great change in her life. After her wedding, she officially stopped being active in the literary world, publishing under pseudonyms, renouncing her previous stand in favor of women's intellectual and literary emancipation, and arguing that women should avoid literary pursuits in favor of developing their character as suitable wives and mothers. Whether she was honest in this change of opinion, or was using irony to make a point, has been the subject of debate. Lenngren came to admire Rousseau, and may have come to support his ideas of the role of women in the 1780s, views further supported by the religious values of simplicity and humility in her childhood home. Ingrid Arvidsson argued that Lenngren had a deeply ambivalent view on the subject, affected by her personality: "The fact that Mrs L was hurt by criticism is evident in several of her poems, but she did also have the more unusual sensitivity of being hurt by admiration".

After her marriage, she hosted a literary salon, which became a center of cultural debate frequented by Gustaf af Leopold, Nils von Rosenstein, Frans Michael Franzén and Gudmund Jöran Adlerbeth. During these years she is described as witty and intelligent but humble and modest.

Her spouse was described as "principally known as useful and boring", but the marriage was a happy one, and she used to take him to the Utile Dulci Academy and sing with him. She had no children, but adopted a daughter. In 1797 the daughter was placed in a mental asylum, but died soon after her admission, an event which affected Lenngren deeply, as did the death of her father, who drowned under suspicious circumstances in 1798.

In 1790, another great change occurred when Johan Henric Kellgren discontinued his literary production because of an illness. This damaged the paper of her spouse and Anna Maria Lenngren resumed her contributions in Stockholms-Posten for financial reasons. However, she insisted on staying anonymous and refused to officially resume her career, although unofficially her pseudonyms were known and she was known as the writer of the work which she published during these years, though she insisted on remaining officially anonymous.

Her salon at Beridarebansgatan was the center of the Royal Swedish Academy, and though she was never a formal member, they called her their "invisible member". On 20 December 1797 the Royal Swedish Academy celebrated her with the Ode till fru Lenngren ("Ode to Mrs Lenngren"), read by Gustaf Fredrik Gyllenborg. She declined their admiration with the poem Dröm ("Dream"), in which she described how the poet Hedvig Charlotta Nordenflycht had appeared to her and deemed her unworthy. However, she signed Dröm with her own name, the first that she had written under her own name since her marriage, and her last.

Lenngren died of breast cancer aged 62, and was buried in Stockholm's Klara kyrka cemetery.

== Literary career ==
Anna Maria Lenngren debuted as a writer of poems for funerals and weddings, and her earliest work has a tone of the ecstatic passion common in the religious circles of her father. This was however quickly replaced by a more sober tone in line with the scientific sense and realism of the Age of Enlightenment.

As a writer, Lenngren frequently used satire, sarcasm, and irony, and she often made parodied the genre of pastoral, opera and ballad. Her verse was often short, portraying everyday life, almost always in a city environment, and she criticized artificiality and lack of genuine value behind the facade. Ideologically, she was inspired by her personal friend and colleague Johan Henric Kellgren, with whom she often worked from 1778 onward. Fredrik Böök says that "there was every word needed and no more, almost no adjectives. She painted with only verbs and substantives", and Snoilsky writes in his poem En afton hos fru Lenngren ("An evening at Mrs Lenngren's"): "It's like a burdock, this witty meter".

Her successful early career during the 1770s was influenced by her feminist ideas, foremost her defense of women's right to participate and engage in intellectual work. This is most evident in the forewords of her translation of Lucile (1776) and her poem Thé-conseillen (1777).

Her radical change in views on the role of women, which took place in her work after her marriage in 1780, has been the subject of much debate. In her poem Några ord till min kära dotter, ifall jag hade någon ("Advice to my dear daughter, if I had one") and 'råden till Betti', she advice women to renounce intellectual aspirations and focus on shaping their character morally to that on an ideal wife and mother. She advice women to concentrate on domestic tasks rather than attempt to meddle in intellectual or political pursuits, because "Our household is our Republic; our politics is our appearance". She herself officially discontinued her career after her marriage by only publishing her works under anonymous pseudonyms and refusing to admit to them. However, Anna Maria Lenngren is famed for her great love for irony, which has created uncertainty about whether she meant what she said literary or if she wished to prove her point by irony. Her poem Dröm, which was given as a response to the admiration from the Academy in 1797, and in which she describe herself as unworthy, has also been interpreted as ironic in this regard.

Anna Maria Lenngren was a supporter of the realistic and scientific views of the age on enlightenment and disliked religion, sometimes interpreted as a protest against the religious environment of her childhood home. She had radical views on Sweden's class system, opposed the privileges of the nobility, and defended the rights of the "third estate" or working class against oppression. She criticized the snobbery of the nobility, the humble admiration their servants gave them and the anxious bowing of the working class, and portrayed the male members of the upper class as cold and merciless and the female members as snobby and ridiculous. A realist, she idealized "the third class", was inspired by the French Revolution. Above all, she fought for the intellectual freedom of women; that also women should be allowed to have opinions, and criticized male double standards.

Her best-known poems on the class system are Hans nåds morgonsömn ("Morning prayer of His Grace") and Grevinnans besök ("Visit from the Countess"), in which she satirizes snobbery, and Pojkarne ("Boys"), in which she laments the fact that children of all classes can play with each other during their childhood, but that this solidarity and friendship is destroyed when they became adults, along with the popular Det blev ingen julgröt men ändå en glad julafton ("There was no oatmeal but still a happy Christmas"), in which she describes the effects of poverty.

== Legacy ==
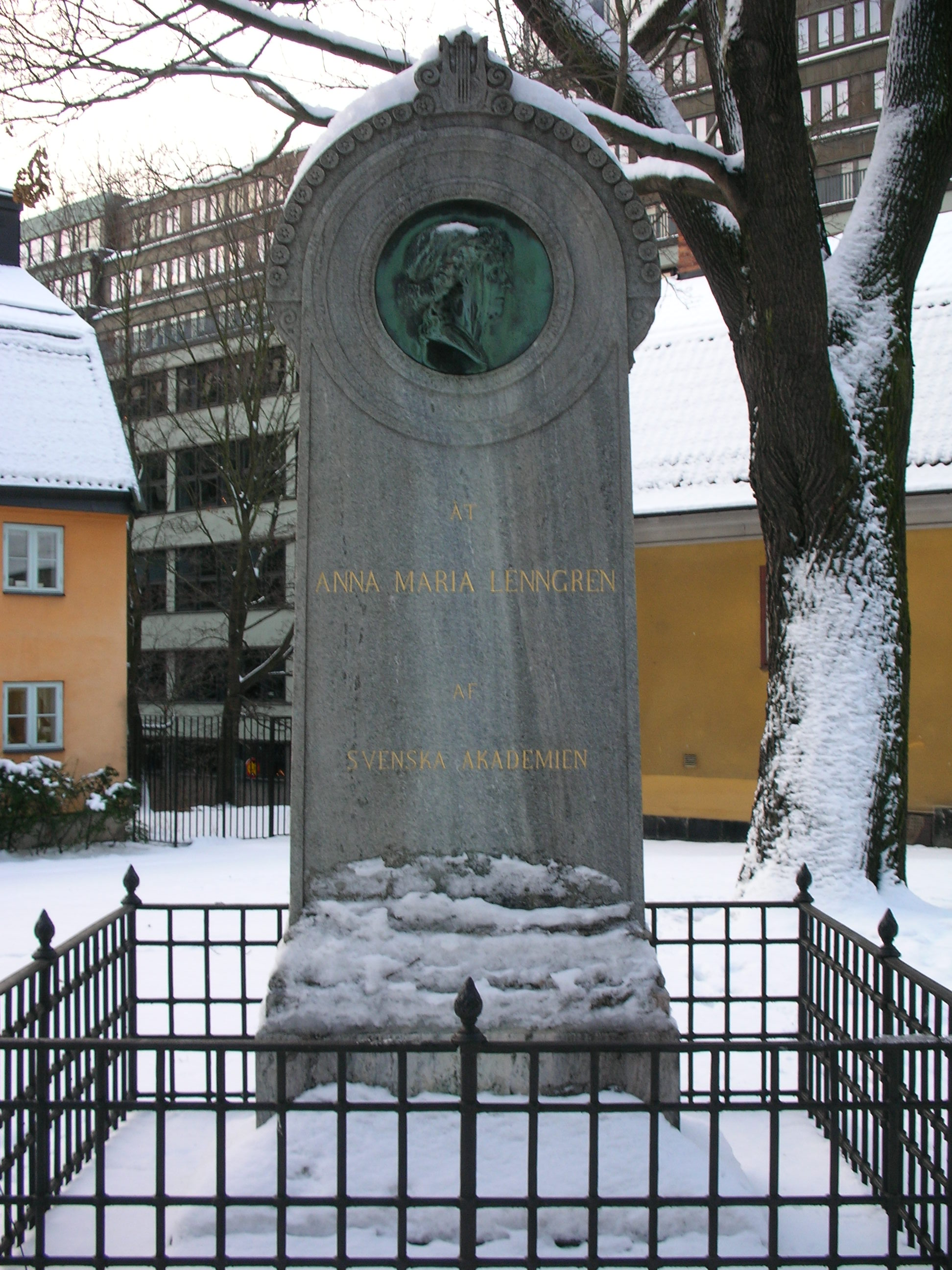
Lenngren's tombstone at Klara kyrka in Stockholm

Anna Maria Lenngren is one of the most famous poets in the history of Sweden. Her production has made her one of the few 18th-century Swedish poets who are still commonly read, and she has been published a number of times after her death during the 19th, 20th and 21st centuries.

In accordance with her instructions, her collected poems were published after her death by her widower under the name Skaldeförsök ("Attempts at Poetry"). After its publication, the Royal Swedish Academy had a memorial medal made with the inscription: "The less she sought fame, the more she gained it".

Her correspondence with her personal friend Gustaf af Leopold from 1795 to 1798 has been published.

== In fiction ==
Anna Maria Lenngren is portrayed in the novel Pottungen ("Chamber-pot child") by Anna Laestadius Larsson from 2014, where she, alongside Ulrika Pasch, Ulrika Widström, Jeanna von Lantingshausen, Marianne Ehrenström and Sophie von Fersen, becomes a member in a Blue Stockings Society organized by the Queen of Sweden and Norway, Hedvig Elisabeth Charlotte of Holstein-Gottorp.

== Works ==
Poems

- På mademoiselle Anna Lovisa Pahls saliga hemfärds dag, den 14 Maji 1772, die Corona, Upsala, 1772
- Tankar vid det nya kyrko årets början 1772, Upsala veckotidningar, 1772, Upsala
- Klagan vid mademoiselle Anna Maria Bobergs graf den 3 Julii 1774, Upsala, 1774
- Afton-qväde, Upsala vecko-tidning, 1774
- Vid caffe-pannan
- Vid archi-biskopens . . . Magni Beronii graf, den 13 Ju-lii, 1775, Uppsala, 1775
- Herrans fruktan, grunden till then bästa vishet, . . . förklarad vid . . . Magni O. Beronii . . . begrafning . . ., Uppsala, 1778
- Impromptu, Lunds vecko-blad, 1775
- Thé-conseillen, Stockholm, 1777
- Öfver hans Kongl. höghets kronprinsens födelse den 1 November 1778, 1778
- Dröm, 1798
- Skaldeförsök, 1819
- Porträtterna (The Portraits)
- Grefvinnans besök (Visit from the Countess)
- Fröken Juliana (Miss Juliana)
- Hans nåds morgonsömn (His Grace's morning snooze)
- Pojkarne (The Boys)
- Den glada festen (The happy party)
- Några ord till min kära dotter, ifall jag hade någon (Advice to my dear daughter, if I had one) 1794
- Andra tyger, andra seder! (Other fabrics, Other customs!)

Prose

- Contributions in Hwad Nytt?? Hwad Nytt??, 1774–1777
- Contributions in Stockholms Posten, 1778–1803, 1809–1810, 1814–1816
- Contributions in Musikaliskt tidsfördrif, 1789–1791, 1793, 1796–1797, 1801, 1816
- Contributions in Sommarpromenaden, 1792, 1794–1797, 1801
- Contributions in Skaldestycken satta i musik, 1795, 1796, 1798, 1800, 1803, 1816

Translations

- J F Marmontel: Lucile operetta, 1776
- Zemire och Azor, Comedie ballet, 1778
- Publius Ovi-dius Naso, Dido til Eneas, Heroide, 1778
- C-S Favart: Arsene, comedie, 1779
- O Wolff: Snart döden skall det öga sluta, 1819

== See also ==
- Sophia Elisabet Brenner
