= Marianne Ehrenström =

Swedish artist (1773–1867)

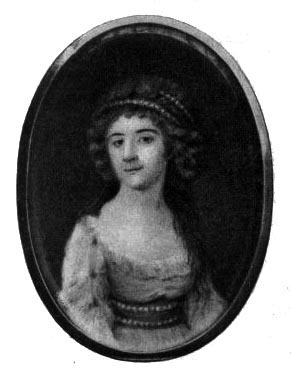
- Born: Mariana Maximiliana Christiana Carolina Lovisa Pollet; 9 December 1773; Zweibrücken
- Died: 4 January 1867 (aged 93); Stockholm
- Occupations: principal and lady-in-waiting
- Known for: Culture personality, member of the Academy of the Free Arts and an honorary member of the Royal Swedish Academy of Music.

Mariana Maximiliana Christiana Carolina Lovisa "Marianne" Ehrenström (née Pollet; 9 December 1773 – 4 January 1867), was a Swedish writer, singer, painter, pianist, culture personality, memoir writer and lady-in-waiting. She was a member of the Academy of the Free Arts and an honorary member of the Royal Swedish Academy of Music.

She is foremost known for her memoirs, which are regarded as a valuable historical documentation, especially about the contemporary cultural life.

== Life ==
Marianne Ehrenström was born in Zweibrücken, Germany, to the Swedish Commendant of Stralsund in Swedish Pomerania, Lieutenant General Johan Frans Pollett, and the dilettante painter Johanna Helena von Pachelbel-Gehag. She was given a good education, and her first language at home was reportedly French, though she also spoke German, and was later to learn Swedish.

=== Culture personality ===
Between 1790 and 1803, she served as hovfröken to the queen of Sweden, Sophia Magdalena of Denmark, who reportedly appreciated her. Ehrenström was known as a multi talented artist. She was educated in singing by the singer Christoffer Christian Karsten, in piano playing by the composer Georg Joseph Vogler and in drama by the actor Jacques Marie Boutet de Monvel.

Being a member of the nobility, she was not professionally active as an artist, but she demonstrated her talent in social life at court and high society and cultural circles, and attracted attention for her abilities. She was regarded as a gifted singer, an accomplished piano player, and admired for her landscape paintings and miniatures. She became a well regarded member of contemporary Swedish culture life, and was acquainted with a number of the leading cultural figures of the era, notably the dramatist Carl Gustaf af Leopold, with whom she corresponded and who dedicated poems to her.

Marianne Ehrenström was inducted into the Academy of the Free Arts in 1800, and became an honorary member of the Royal Swedish Academy of Music in 1814.

=== Later life ===
In 1803, she left the royal court and married Colonel Nils Fredrik Ehrenström (1756–1816). Reportedly, the marriage was a purely practical affair, as Ehrenström was an old friend of her family and she was forced to think of her future, as her family was not wealthy and she needed to marry to support herself: her spouse, on the other hand, had been appointed commandant of Gothenburg and needed a wife to handle the representational side of his position, as he had recently divorced his first wife Maria Charlotta von Scheven for having eloped with their adoptive son. After the wedding, she left Stockholm for Gothenburg, where she became a celebrated member of Gothenburg high society life. The marriage did not result in issue.

In 1812, her spouse went bankrupt and lost his position, and she separated from him and returned to Stockholm. Between 1815 and 1831, she supported herself by managing a girls' school. After having closed her school in 1831, she mainly lived on some smaller annuities given to her by old acquaintances.

== Legacy ==
In 1826, she published a book about writers, theatre, music, painting and sculpture. Ehrenström is most known for her memoirs in French, which is regarded as a valuable reference work of contemporary Stockholm and Gothenburg in 1792–1812, particularly the contemporary culture life. The unpublished manuscript is now kept at the Swedish Academy.

A selected part of her memoirs were translated and published by Henrik Schück in 1919 under the title Den sista gustavianska hofdamen ('The last lady in waiting from the age of Gustav III').

== In fiction ==
Marianne Ehrenström is portrayed in the novel Pottungen (Chamber pot child) by Anna Laestadius Larsson from 2014, in which she, alongside Ulrika Pasch, Anna Maria Lenngren, Ulrika Widström, Jeanna von Lantingshausen and Sophie von Fersen, becomes a member of a Blue Stockings Society organized by Hedvig Elisabeth Charlotte of Holstein-Gottorp.

== Works ==
- 1826 – Notices sur la littérature et les beaux arts en Suède
- 1830 – Notice biographique sur monsieur de Leopold, secrétaire d'état

== See also ==
- Margareta Alströmer
- Christina Charlotta Cederström
- Märta Helena Reenstierna
