= Snoilsky =

Snoilsky was the name of three Swedish noble families, who are all now extinct. The family originated from Carniola.

A famous member of this family is the poet Carl Snoilsky and his mother, painter Sigrid Snoilsky (née Banér).
