= Anna König =

Anna König may refer to:

- Anna König Jerlmyr (born 1978), Swedish politician
- Anna Leonore König (1771–1854), Swedish singer and musician
