= Stockholms-Posten =

Swedish newspaper

Stockholms-Posten (lit. 'The Stockholm Post') was a Swedish newspaper, published between 20 October 1778 and 1833. It belonged to the biggest papers in Swedish press during its publication, and is known for its influence upon contemporary Swedish culture.

== History ==
Stockholms-Posten was founded by the poet Johan Henric Kellgren, the book printer Johan Christopher Holmberg (1743–1810) and Carl Peter Lenngren (1750–1827), an official at the National Board of Trade (Sweden). From 1779, it was published every day except Sundays.

The paper, as was common in the contemporary press, relied heavily on articles written by the readers by Letter to the editor, which was common in a period when papers seldom had any permanent staff of journalists. It selected its articles successfully, and while most papers in this period became temporary, Stockholms-Posten became successful and has been called "edited by the public".

The paper supported science and intellectualism in oppose to religion, and was viewed as a spokes organ of the new epoch:

Only with Stockholms-Posten has the Age of Enlightenment became popular; it has now been given the words, by which it can win the support of the broader burgher classes, and in parallel acquire the light and frivolous tone, which belong to the Gustavians rather than to the Age of Liberty.

In February 1788, Johan Henric Kellgren became its sole publisher, and introduced permanent culture sections with a poetic section and critics of published poetry, theater plays and other cultural phenomena. It was often a place for literary debates and sometime controversies.

Among its more known co-workers were J. Tengström (1779–81), Anna Maria Lenngren, (from 1780), N. L. Sjöberg (1783-?) Carl Gustaf af Leopold (1785–88, 1792), Rosenstein (1787), Regnér (1790s), A. G. Silverstolpe (1793–95) and Franzén (1793–99).

In 1795, the paper was taken over by Carl Peter Lenngren, sole editor 1795–1813; he was followed by A. Wiborg 1813–21 och Anders Lindeberg 1821–33.

The last years, the paper was affected by a deteriorating economy, and found hard competition from Aftonbladet, which was founded in 1830. Three years later, Stockholms-Posten was dissolved.
