= Christina Fredenheim =

Swedish artist (1762–1841)

Christina Elisabet Fredenheim (née Hebbe) (1762–1841) was a Swedish artist, singer and noblewoman. She was a member of the Royal Swedish Academy of Music.

Christina Fredenheim was a well known and acknowledged non professional musician and singer. She was married to the noble Carl Fredrik Fredenheim, intendent of the Royal academies. She was considered a very good soprano, but her lack of professional training caused her to make some noted mistakes in her performances. Her social position made it considered to be unsuitable for her to perform professionally; as other dilettante artists from the upper classes, she performed in public only at charity concerts and such, otherwise only in private.

In 1799, for example, she performed in a concert in Stockholm in a duett with Marianne Ehrenström accompanied by Christoffer Christian Karsten and with Margareta Alströmer playing Clavichord, and in 1801, she sang the parts of Eve and the angel Gabriel in the performance of creation by Haydn.

In 1795, she was elected as a member in to the Swedish Royal Academy of Music, together with Margareta Alströmer, Ulrica Bouck, and Anna Brita Wendelius.

== See also ==
- Brita Catharina Lidbeck
- Anna Leonore König
