= Anna Charlotta Schröderheim =

Swedish noble

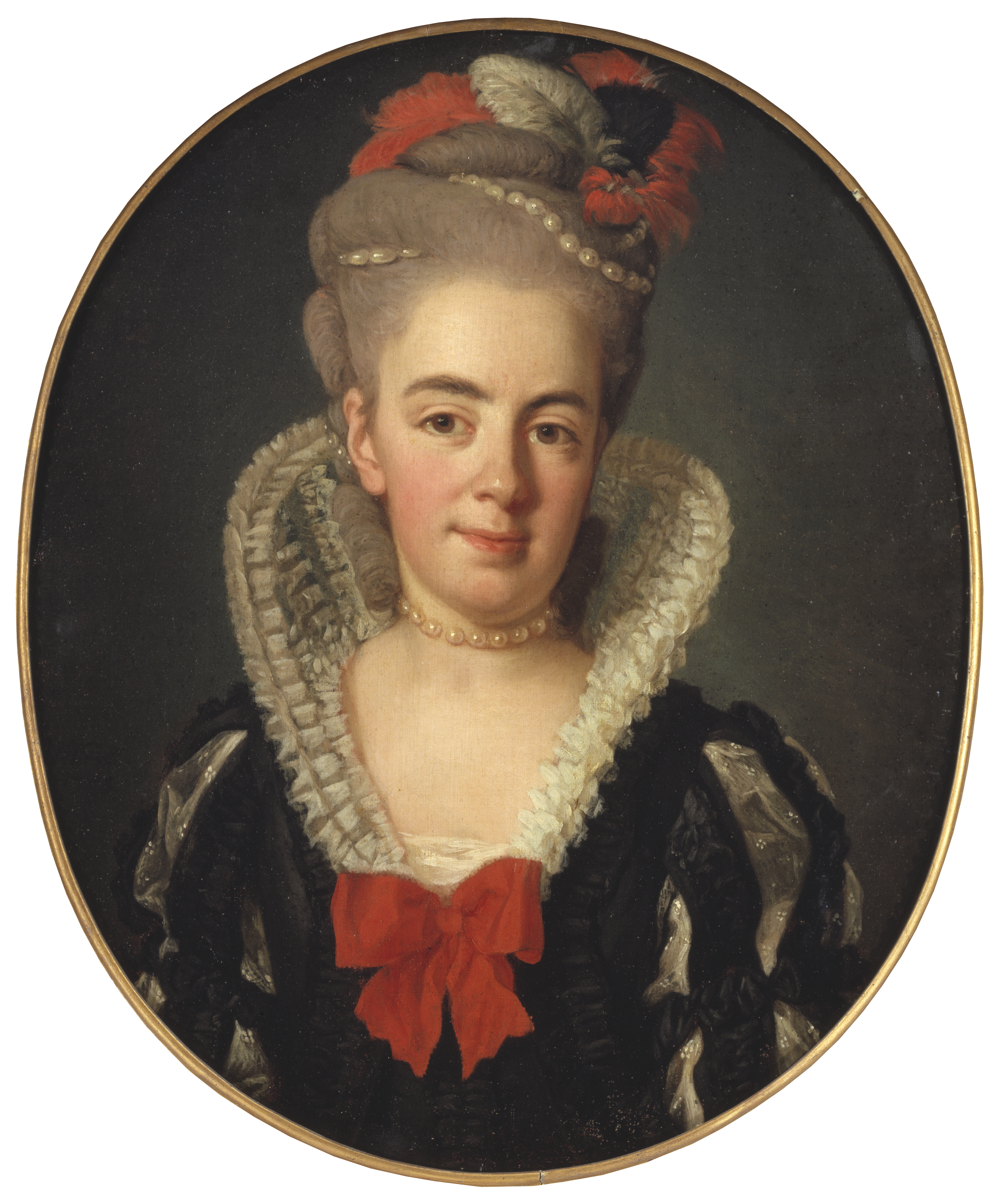
- Anna Charlotta Schröderheim, wearing the Nationella dräkten with its high collar, used by ladies-in waiting or women presented at court.
- Born: Anna Charlotta von Stapelmohr; 24 September 1754; Stockholm, Sweden
- Died: 1 January 1791 (aged 36); Stockholm, Sweden
- Other names: Ann-Charlotte Schröderheim, Anne-Charlotte Schröderheim
- Known for: Salonist and wit, love affairs

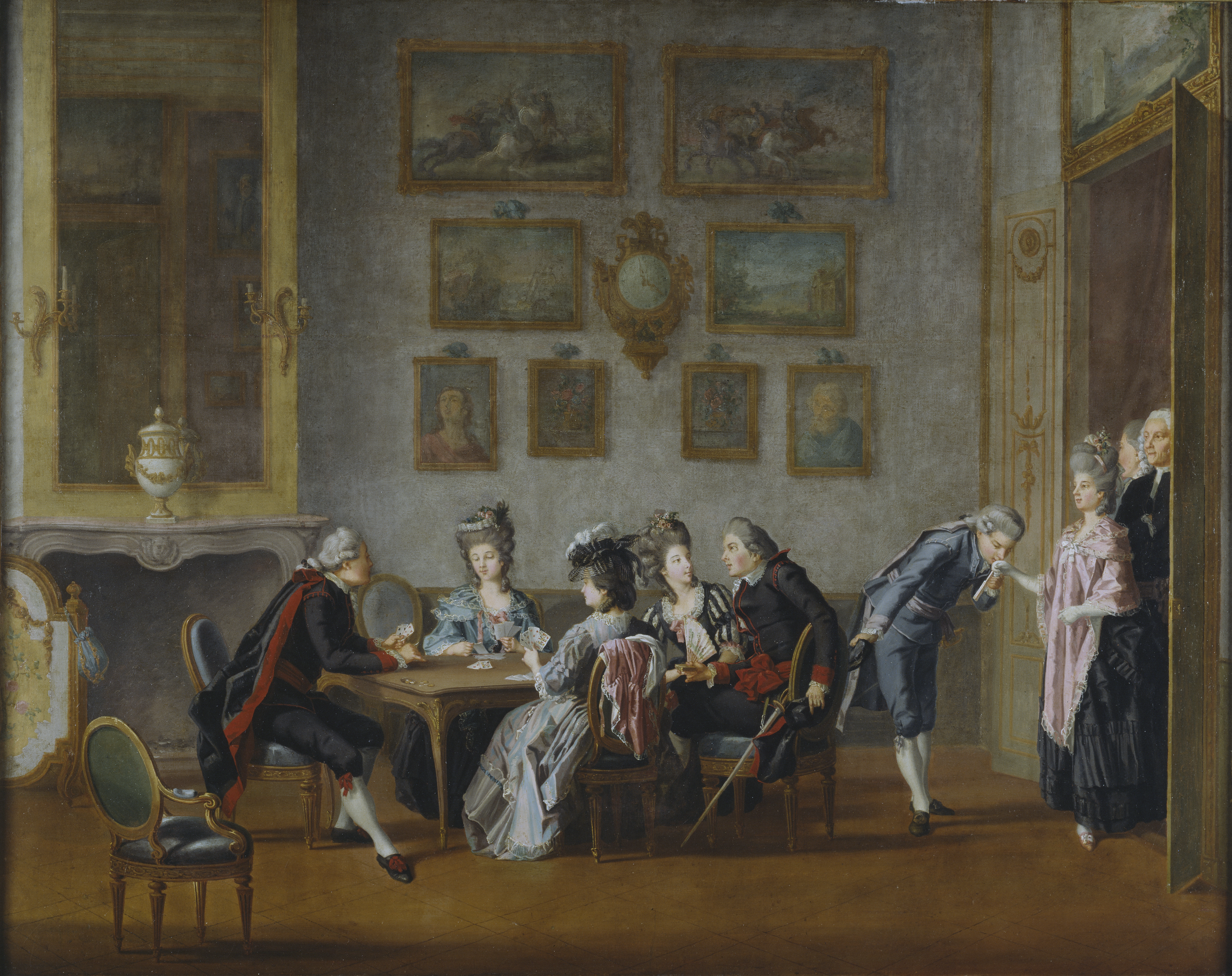
Card-Party in the Home of Elis Schröderheim by Pehr Hilleström.

Anna Charlotta Schröderheim, née Anna Charlotta von Stapelmohr, also called Ann-Charlotte or Anne-Charlotte, (24 September 1754 – 1 January 1791), was a Swedish noble, wit and salonist, spouse of the politician Elis Schröderheim. She was one of the most known socialites of her time and became one of the more known symbols of the Gustavian age. She was the inspiration for several poets; poems by Crusenstolpe, Bellman and Carl Gustaf af Leopold was dedicated to her.

== Biography ==
=== Socialite ===
Anna Charlotta was born daughter of the wealthy Christoffer Lorentz von Stapelmohr and Maria Lucretia Dittmer: her father was director of the sea customs and was ennobled in 1756. Her parents home was a center for the capital's high society and Charlotta was a celebrated beauty.

After her marriage to the noble (since 1759) Elis Schröderheim in 1776, she became the greatest socialite and society hostess of Stockholm. Her husband was then minister and the second most powerful man in the country, and her salon became a center of the aristocracy, where her husbands "amiable jokes" mingled with the conversation and sharp tongue of his spouse. She is described as passionate, intelligent and wit as a person, beautiful with "burning brown eyes" to her appearance. She was a member of the order Stora Amaranther-orden (1779), and of the academy Utile Dulci. She was one of only three females known to have been a member of the Utile Dulci, the other being Anna Maria Lenngren and Anna Brita Wendelius.

The marriage was not a marriage of love, but rather a union of friendship. Several of the friends of the couple were pointed out as her lovers, and she was known for her love affairs, but her husband was tolerant, and the couple lived in harmony. In 1789, the young royal secretary Carl Wilhelm Seele was her lover: Seele was called l'Adonis de la Roture and known for changing clothes three or four times a day to "coming, going and riding to demonstrate his beauty".

Among her lovers were Crusenstolpe and his father. Several of her lovers belonged to the opposition of Gustav III, and her salon became a center of political opposition, where the political acts as well as the personal life of the monarch were exposed to criticism through witty remarks. This disturbed the political career of her spouse, a loyal supporter of the monarch, who demanded of him to close his home to his enemies and tell his wife not to interfere in politics. A conflict arose between Anna Charlotta and the monarch.

=== Scandal and death ===
In 1790, Charlotta was pregnant by Seele. In contrast to his usual behavior, Schröderheim demanded a divorce and declared that the child was not his and would be taken from her and registered as dead after the birth. It became a scandal. The reason for the changed behavior of her husband was said to be the king: during a political disagreement, Gustav III, made a remark about her childless marriage and her latest interest in Bruse, one of his stable masters, upon which she answered him: "Your Majesty, we can not afford to keep an equerry"

This remark deeply offended the King, who quite correctly took it as a remark about his and the queen's rumored relationship with the royal stable master, equerry Count Adolf Fredrik Munck af Fulkila: the rumor at the time claimed that the King had asked Munck to impregnate the queen.

The sympathies was largely on Anna Charlotta's side during the scandal. She gave birth to a daughter on Christmas day 25 December 1790 and died shortly after the childbirth 1 January 1791, "of sorrow" according to the gossip. In 1796, Elsa Fougt gave a memorial speech to her in the order Stora Amaranther-orden:

Court and city admired her exquisite taste, her playful mind. Learning and the beautiful arts were flattered by her support. Her house became the center of the best company and the school for good tone, the true amiability, the decent joy. One gathered around her, to hear her every word; one admired and praised her wit. Every whim was considered to be better than what preceded it, and there were those, who thought themselves to be wits, only by hearing her and repeating what she, even without effort, had babbled forth. So passed some happy years, by which she, flattered by everyone's applause and safe by the nature of her own good heart, free from sorrow abandoned herself to the shining pleasures of the grand world.

Her daughter, Charlotte Schröderheim, was raised as a foster-child at the home of her close friend, Beata Elisabeth Théel (1744–1805). In her memorial speech over Anna Charlotta Schröderheim, which can be described as a forceful defense of a controversial woman, Elsa Fougt describes her a person of great intellectual abilities who could have become much more if the attitude toward women had been more liberal: "the learned Utile Dulci was honored to count her among its members. How worthy was she not of this calling, and how long she could have gone in the learned professions, had she seen them as becoming of her sex"

== In fiction ==
Anna Charlotta Schröderheim has been portrayed by actress Brita Appelgren in the movie Ulla, min Ulla (1930) and by Renée Björling in the movie Två Konungar (1925).

She is also the subject of the novel God natt, madame ("Good night, madame") by Carina Burman (2021).

== See also ==
- Eva Helena Löwen
- Henrika Juliana von Liewen
- Ulrika von Fersen
