= Julia Nyberg =

Swedish poet and songwriter

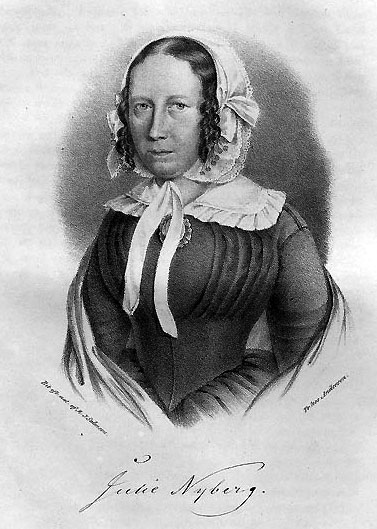
Nyberg

Julia Kristina Nyberg (née Svärdström; 17 November 1784 – 16 April 1854), was a Swedish poet and songwriter. She published two collections of poetry and was awarded by the Swedish Academy. She wrote the vast majority of her works under the pseudonym Euphrosyne.

== Biography ==
Julia Kristina Nyberg was born in the parish of Skultuna in Västmanland County, Sweden. Her parents, Per Svärdström (1726–1789) and Beata Eliasdotter Almgren (1747–1799), both died while she was young. She grew up as the foster daughter of industrialist and mill owner, named Adlerwald. In 1809 she moved to Stockholm, where she was influenced by the Aurora League (Aurora-förbundet), an artistic society under the leadership of Per Daniel Amadeus Atterbom. In 1822, she moved back to Skultuna and was married the same year to Anders Wilhelm Nyberg (1793–1851).

Nyberg is most famous for her songs written for the Walpurgis Night holiday, many of which are still sung and recorded today, including "Vårvindar friska" and "Fruktmånglerskan med tapperhetsmedalj". For the majority of her literary career she belonged to the circle of writers that formed around the Romantic poet Per Daniel Amadeus Atterbom and regularly published her poetry in the group's journal: Poetisk kalender. She never aspired to the epic poetry that characterized many of her contemporaries' works, but instead focused on writing shorter poems inspired by nature.

== Bibliography ==
- Dikter af Euphrosyne (1822)
- Nyare Dikter af Euphrosyne (1828)
- Vublina (1828)
- Samlade Dikter af Euphrosyne (1832)
- Nya Dikter af Euphrosyne (1842)

== See also ==
- Anna Maria Lenngren
- Ulrika Widström
