= Georg Johan De Besche =

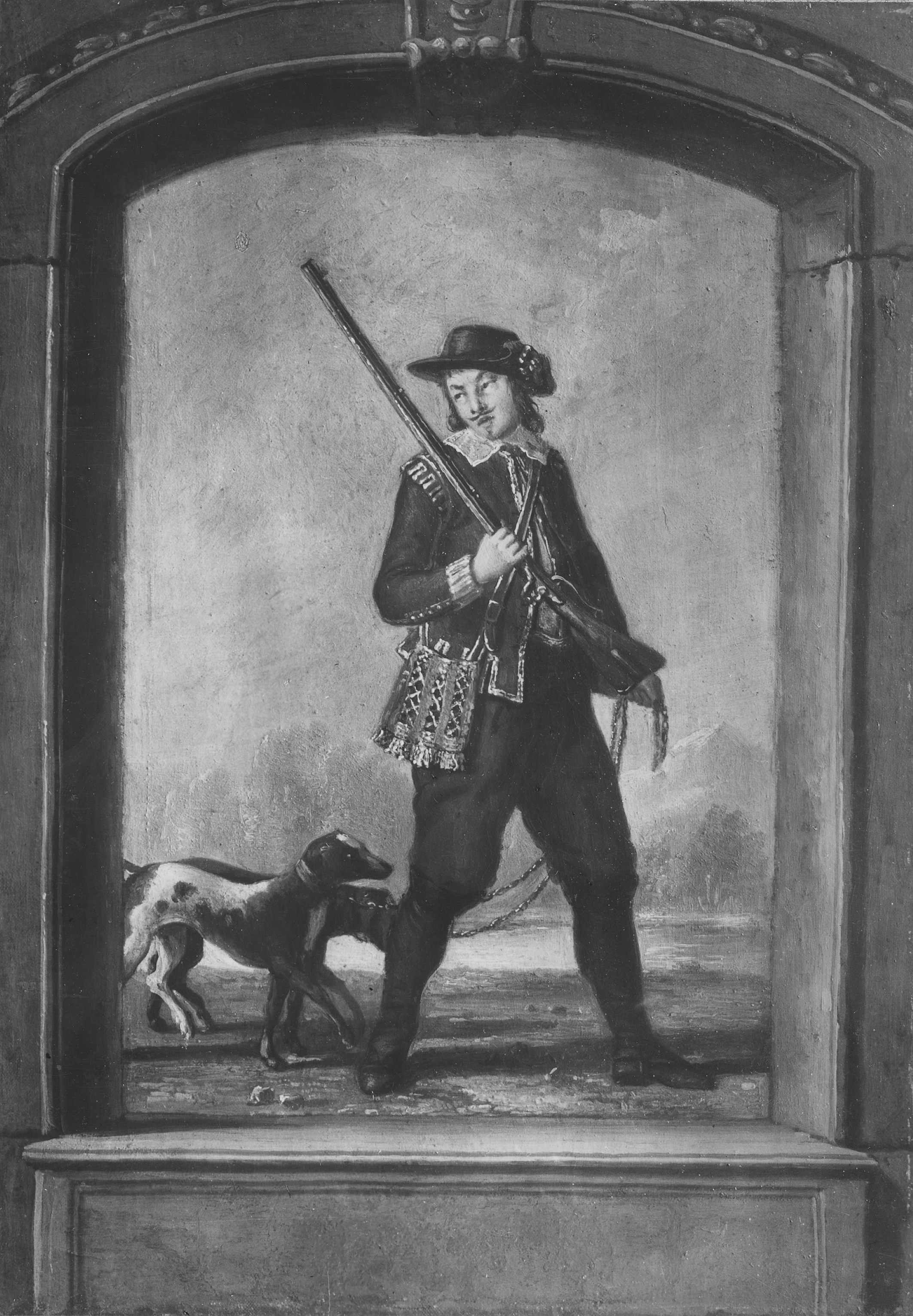
Georg Johan De Besche, on stage as a member of the Amateur Theater of king Gustav III, by Pehr Hilleström, Nationalmuseum.

Georg Johan De Besche (1754–1814) was a Swedish courtier, colonel, governor and a favorite of Gustav III of Sweden.

Georg Johan De Besche was the son of Johan Jacob De Besche and Anna Catharina Hilchen. He never married. He became page to Gustav III in 1770, chamber page in 1774, courtier in 1783 and governor of Stockholm Royal Palace in 1793–94. He had a career in the Västgöta cavalry regiment, where he became a cadet in 1765, lieutenant in 1776, major in 1787 and colonel in 1792.

Georg Johan De Besche belonged to the group of male favorites of Gustav III consisting of Adolf Fredrik Munck, Gustaf Mauritz Armfelt, Fabian Wrede and the brothers Evert Vilhelm Taube and Karl Edvard Taube who was referred to as pet-youths. Like several others of the King's male favorites, he himself was known for his love affairs with women; he was known for his taste for "Vulgar girls", and according to Princess Charlotte, he had a bad reputation and was considered to be debauched. According to Elis Schröderheim, after the parliament of 1789, when Gustav III had punished the noble opposition and as a consequence was punished by being socially ostracized from high society by a demonstration of female nobles led by Jeanna von Lantingshausen, he became completely socially dependent upon this group of favorites, with whom he isolated himself at the Gustav III's Pavilion by Haga Palace, where he engaged in ill-reputed orgies with prostitutes.

After the death of Gustav III, the position of the De Besche deteriorated, and in 1795 he finally lost all his remaining offices with the motivation that he was a Gustavian. In 1806, he was given the position of chamberlain at the court of Queen Dowager Sophia Magdalena who, while she disliked all the male favorites of Gustav III while he were alive, with the exception of Munck, treated them with consideration after he was dead.
