= Elsa Fougt =

Swedish publisher and editor (1744–1826)

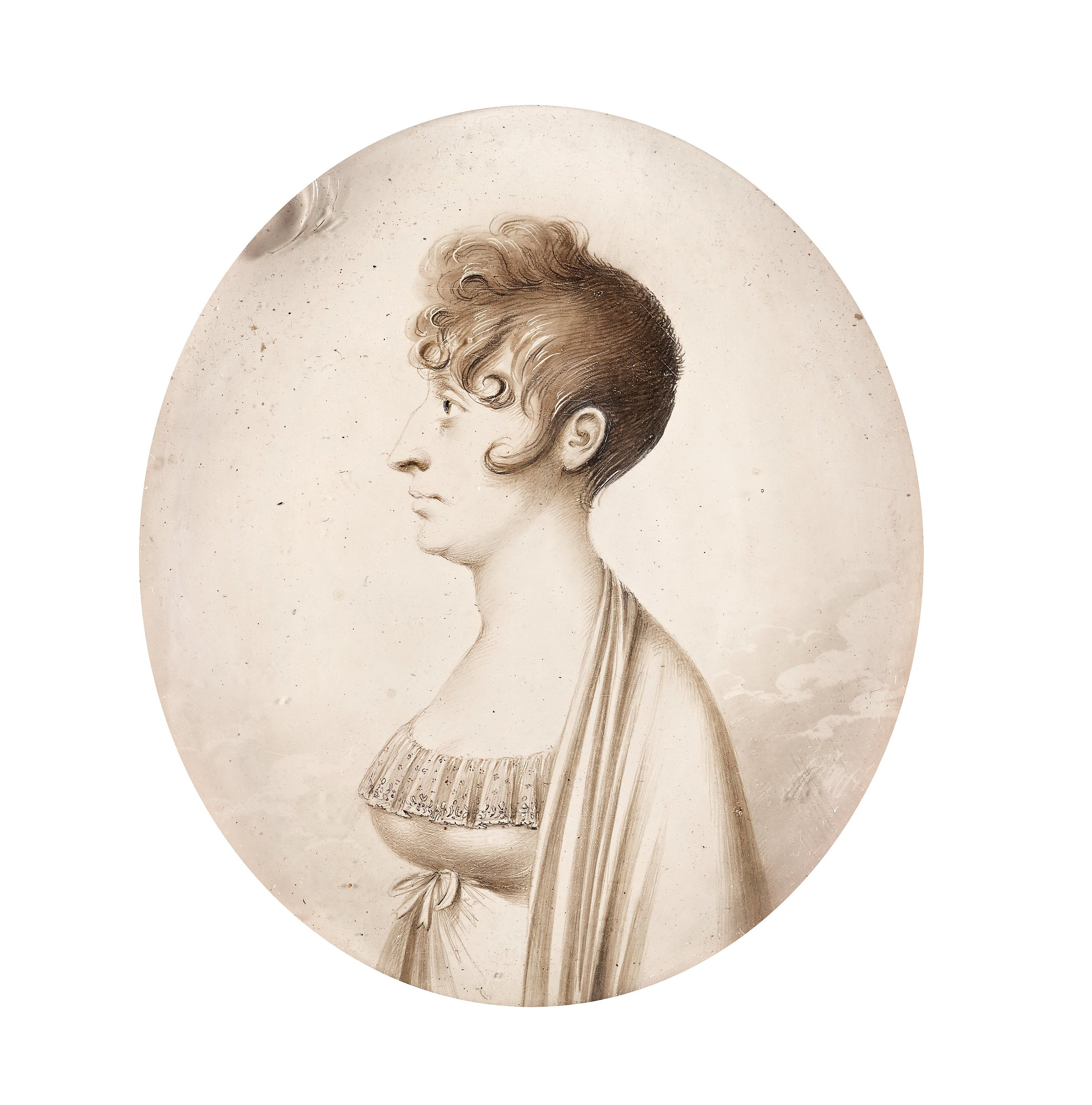
- Born: December 15, 1744; Sweden
- Died: June 19, 1826 (aged 81)
- Occupations: Printer, newspaper editor
- Years active: 39
- Spouse: Henric Fougt Sr.

Elsa Fougt (15 or 25 December 1744 – 19 June 1826) was a Swedish printer and newspaper editor. She managed the Royal Printery between 1772 and 1811 (first as a coworker with her spouse, from 1782 alone as director), and was responsible for the country's official print. She was also and the publisher and chief editor of the newspaper Stockholms Weckoblad from 1774 to 1779. She was an important figure in the literary market in Sweden.

== Life ==
Fougt was the daughter of the royal printer Peter Momma and the publisher Anna Margareta von Bragner. In 1762 she married the official Henric Fougt Sr.

When her parents died, both in 1772, Elsa and her spouse took over their businesses. The most important business was the Royal Printery, which they managed together until the death of her spouse in 1782. As a widow, she managed the business herself and in her own name for nearly thirty years. Elsa Fougt published French, German and Swedish drama, and imported books from the Société typographique de Neuchâtel in Switzerland.

She was herself also editor for the paper Stockholms Weckoblad from 1774 to 1779.

She was a member of the order Amarenterorden, in which she gave memorial speeches of the salonist Anna Charlotta von Stapelmohr and one of the co-founders of the order, Beata Elisabeth Théel.

In 1811, she retired and was succeeded by her son Henric Fougt Jr. in May, 1811. Henric Fougt Jr. laid down the business by the end of 1833. Norstedt & Söner acquired it in 1835. Henric Fougt Jr., like his parents, held the privilege to print all official publications in the Swedish Realm.

Prior to Henric Fougt Sr. and his wife Elsa Fougt and their son Henric Fougt Jr., the father of Elsa Fougt - Peter Momma - had held the same position; they all were the official "Royal Printers" of the Swedish Realm.

== See also ==
- Catharina Ahlgren
- Anna Hammar-Rosén
