= Anna Brita Wendelius =

Swedish artist (1741–1804)

- Born: 1741
- Died: 1804 (aged 62–63)
- Known for: Musician, Poetry
- Spouse: Anders Wendelius

Anna Brita Wendelius, née Ramklou (1741–1804), also known as Wendelia, was a Swedish artist and singer. She was a member of the Royal Swedish Academy of Music and the Utile Dulci.

Anna Brita Wendelius was married to a wealthy merchant, Anders Wendelius. She was known as a non professional musician and singer, and was also a published poet. She was one of only three females known to have been a member of the Utile Dulci, the other being Anna Charlotta von Stapelmohr and Anna Maria Lenngren. In 1777, it is mentioned that she performed at one of the ceremonies of the Utile Dulci with her own written recitative and aria. In 1795, she was elected as a member into the Swedish Royal Academy of Music, together with Margareta Alströmer and Christina Fredenheim.
