= Utile Dulci =

The Utile Dulci was a learned and musical Academy and Secret Society in Stockholm in Sweden. It was founded in memory of Olof von Dalin in 1766, and held its last session in 1795.

== History ==
The Utile Dulci was alongside the Royal Swedish Academy of Letters, History and Antiquities the predecessor of the Swedish Academy (1786) and the Royal Swedish Academy of Music (1771), and the Utile Dulci suffered hard competition when the latter was founded. It was an important part of the Swedish culture life and, among other things, hosted public concerts. During the 1780s, it had 540 members.

== Notable members ==
- Anna Maria Lenngren
- Hedvig Löfwenskiöld
- Johan Gabriel Oxenstierna
- Anna Charlotta Schröderheim
- Nils Lorens Sjöberg
- Anna Brita Wendelius
- Georg Adlersparre

== Sources ==
- Utile Dulci i Nordisk familjebok (andra upplagan, 1921)
- Nationalencyklopedin
