= Anna Leonore König =

Swedish singer and musician

Anna Leonore König, née Falck (29 October 1771 – 20 March 1854), was a Swedish singer and musician (keyboard). She was solo singer in the "Musikaliska inrättningen" (The Musical Institution) in Norrköping in 1797–1801. She was married to Georg Henric König.

König was elected as a member (chair 153) by the Royal Swedish Academy of Music 31 December 1794.

== See also ==
- Christina Fredenheim
- Margareta Alströmer
