= Anna Hammar-Rosén =

Swedish newspaper editor

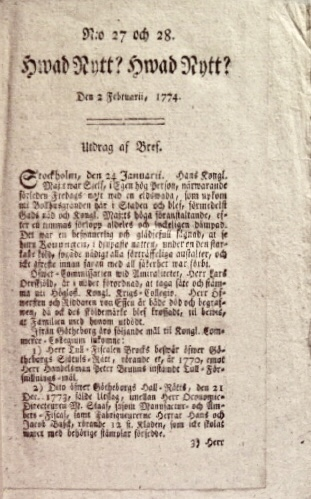
HwadNytt 1774-02-02

Anna Hammar-Rosén, née Hammar (1735–1805), was a Swedish newspaper editor. She was the director, chief editor and publisher of the popular newspaper Hwad Nytt?? Hwad Nytt?? in Gothenburg between 1773 and 1795. She was a pioneering figure for women in journalism in Sweden.

== Life ==
Anna Hammar-Rosén was the daughter of the vicar Anund Hammar and Elisabeth Maria Agrell. She married the Johan Rosén (1726–1773), professor at the Hvitfeldtska gymnasiet in Gothenburg, in 1759, and became the mother of the writer Gustaf Rosén (1772–1836).

In 1772, Johan Rosén founded the newspaper Hvad nytt, hvad nytt? ("What's new, What's new?"). When he died the following year, Anna succeeded him as chief editor and managed the paper until 1795.

Hvad nytt, hvad nytt? was a popular paper which included news and politics as well as cultural topics and was published two or three times a week, at that time a good number. Several of the most famed writers of the Gustavian age were published in the paper: Bengt Lidner and Anna Maria Lenngren (1775) both debuted there. Despite her success, she officially commented on its success with customary humility, replying that she herself doubted that a paper published by an uneducated female was much worth having.

Anna Hammar-Rosén was not the first woman editor and journalist in Sweden - Margareta Momma had debuted as such already in 1738 - but in contrast to many other women, she did not publish herself anonymous pseudonyms, which was otherwise the common custom for female journalists of the time. While female publishers were fairly common in 18th-century Sweden, were widows inherited the business of their late husbands, the vast majority of them did so only for a few years before they remarried, and Anna Hammar-Rosén was uncommon in being a career-publisher who managed her business for a considerable time and made a mark on her industry of business.
