= Sigrid Snoilsky =

Swedish painter and countess

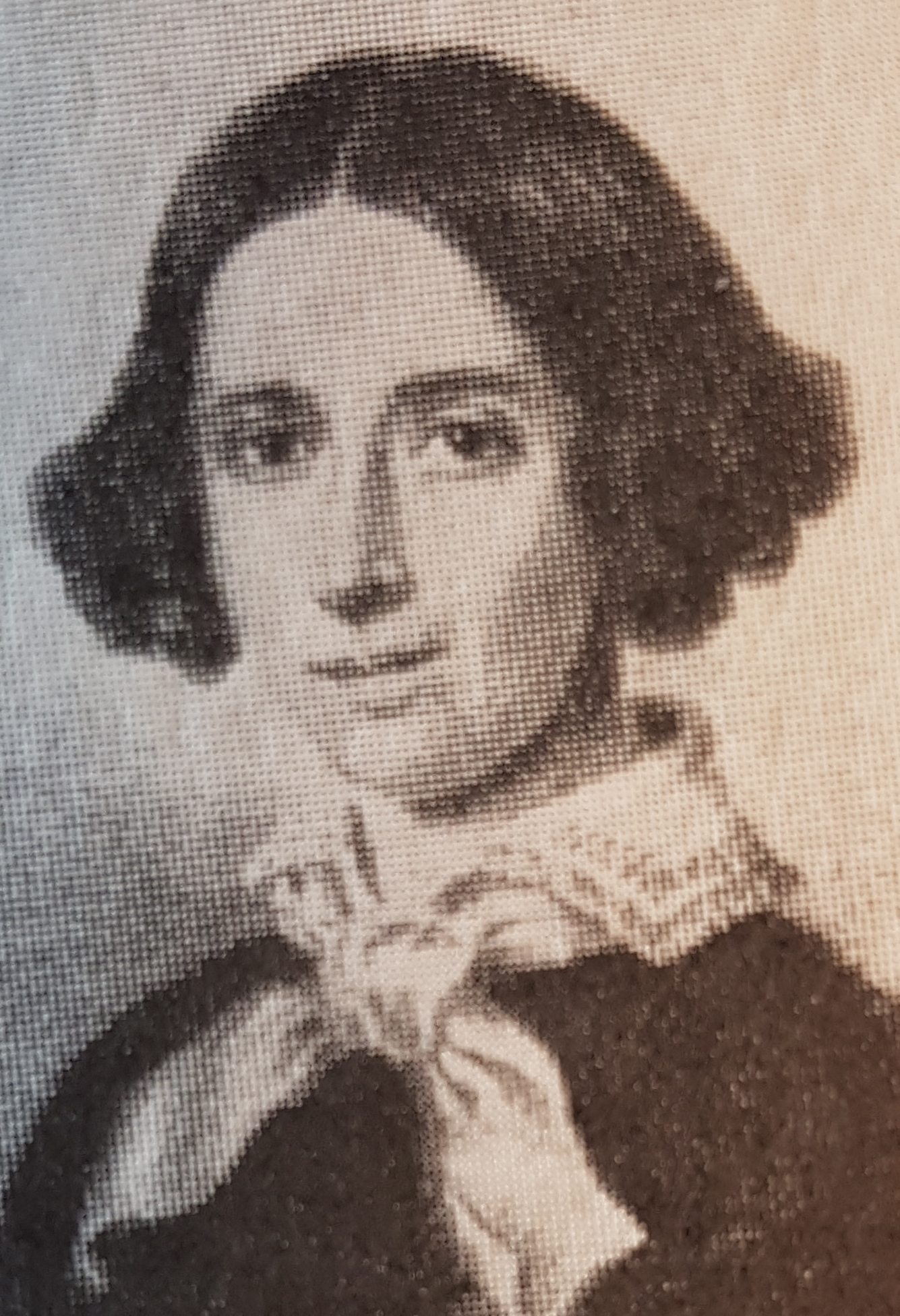
- Sigrid Snoilsky
- Born: Sigrid Fredrika Juliana Banér; 14 November 1813; Östra Ryd, Sweden
- Died: 19 August 1856 (aged 42); Stockholm, Sweden
- Other names: Sigrid Baner
- Known for: painting, countess

Sigrid Fredrika Juliana Snoilsky (1813–1856) was a Swedish painter and countess.

She was born Sigrid Fredrica Juliana Banér on 14 November 1813 in Östra Ryd parish, Östergötland, Sweden. Her parents were Margareta von Both and Johan Gustaf Banér, a lieutenant colonel. She married in 1840 to Nils Snoilsky, a Justice and Chamberlain Count. Together they had a son, Carl Johan Gustaf Snoilsky who went on to become a known poet.

Her work is included in various public museum collections including the Nationalmuseum in Sweden, amongst others.
