= Carl Snoilsky =

Swedish poet (1841–1903)

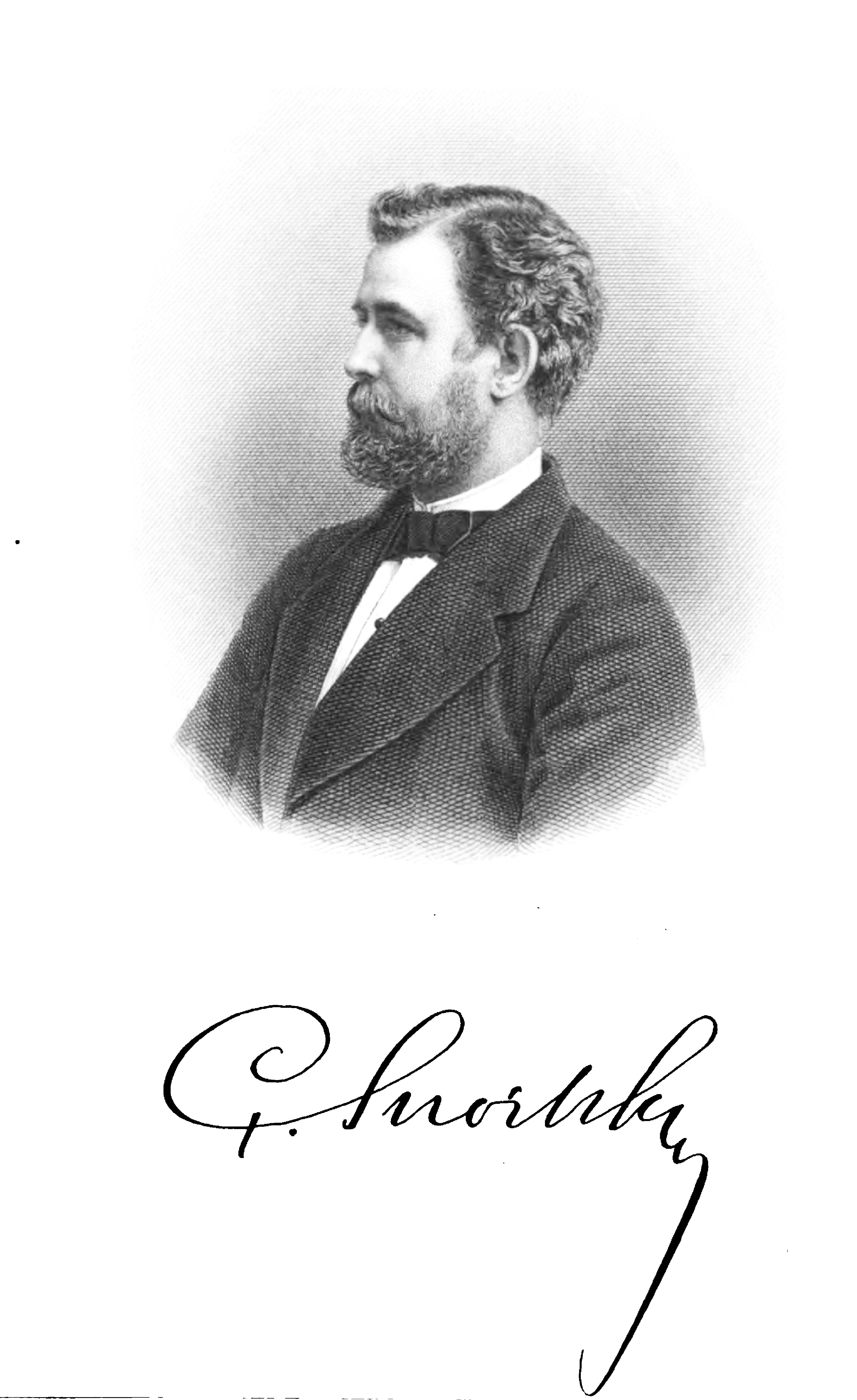
Carl Snoilsky (1841–1903)

Count Carl Johan Gustaf Snoilsky (8 September 1841 – 19 May 1903) was a Swedish diplomat and lyricist of probable Slovene descent. He was regarded as an early realist. and was a member of the Swedish Academy. His life and work influenced playwright Henrik Ibsen, particularly in Rosmersholm.

== Biography ==
Snoilsky was born in Stockholm to Sigrid (née Banér), a painter and countess, and Nils Snoilsky, a Justice and Chamberlain Count. He was educated at the Clara School and Stockholms lyceum and in 1860 became a student at the University of Uppsala. He was trained for diplomacy, which he quit for work at the Swedish Foreign Ministry. As early as 1861, under the pseudonym of Sven Tröst, he began to print poems, and he soon became the center of the literary society of the capital. In 1862 he published a collection of lyrics called Orchideer ("Orchids"). During 1864 and 1865 he was in Madrid and Paris on diplomatic missions. It was in 1869, when he first collected his Dikter under his own name, that Snoilsky took rank among the most eminent contemporary poets. His Sonnetter in 1871 increased his reputation. Then, for some years, Snoilsky abandoned poetry, and devoted himself to the work of the Foreign Office and to the study of numismatics.

In 1876, however, he published a translation of the ballads of Goethe. Snoilsky had in 1876 been appointed keeper of the records (expeditionssekreterare) and head of the Foreign Ministry`s political department, in 1878 he was raised to deputy director (kansliråd), and succeeded Bishop Paul Genberg as one of the eighteen of the Swedish Academy. But in 1879 he resigned all his posts, and left Sweden abruptly for Florence with the Dowager Countess Ebba Piper, née Baroness Ruuth, whom he married in 1880. Snoilsky sent home in 1881 a volume of Nya Dikter ("New Poems"). Two other volumes of Dikter appeared in 1883 and 1887, and 1897; Savonarola, a poem, in 1883, and Hvita frun ("The White Lady") in 1885. In 1886, he collected his poems dealing with national subjects as Svenska bilder (2nd ed., 1895), which ranks as a Swedish classic. In 1891 he returned to Stockholm and was appointed principal librarian (överbibliotekarie) of the Royal Library. He died at Stockholm on May 19, 1903. His Samlade dikter were collected (Stockholm, 5 vols.) in 1903–1904.

Regarding his origins, the slavist Alfred Jensen reported to the Slovenian poet Anton Aškerc that Snoilsky was of Slovene descent. Snoilsky said that his ancestor was a Protestant pastor Snoilshik from Znojile in Carniola who titled himself Labacus (from Ljubljana). The claim, which was popularised in Slovenia by the poet Anton Aškerc, has not been fully proven, but it is plausible. The name has been associated with the Carniolan protestant reformer Johann Snoilshik.

== Evaluation ==
His poetry focused on themes of joy, liberty, and beauty, and in his lyrics, more than in most modern verse, with themes that emphasize youthful enthusiasm. His verse has been noted for its delicacy and melodiousness.

Cultural offices
Preceded by Paul Genberg	Swedish Academy; Seat No.10; 1876-1903	Succeeded by Harald Hjärne
