= Margareta Momma =

Swedish publisher, chief editor and journalist

Anna Margareta Momma (née von Bragner; 1702–1772) was a Swedish publisher and journalist. She was the chief editor and publisher of the political essay Samtal emellan Argi Skugga och en obekant Fruentimbers Skugga (1738-1739) as well as the chief editor and publisher of the Stockholm Gazette (1742-1752). Chronologically, she may be counted as the first identified female journalist in Sweden.

== Early life ==
Momma was born in the Netherlands, possibly as a descendant of French Huguenots.

In 1735, she married the Swedish publisher Peter Momma (d. 1772), himself of a Swedish family of Dutch origin, and settled in the Swedish capital of Stockholm. She was the mother of Petter (1738-1758), Wilhelm (1740-1772) and Elsa (1744–1826). Peter Momma was the owner of the Royal Printery and the publisher and editor of popular papers such as the Stockholm Gazette (1742) and the Stockholms Weckoblad (1745), and she played an active part as his business partner.

== Career ==
Momma was identified as the author behind the Swedish language essay paper Samtal emellan Argi Skugga och en obekant Fruentimbers Skugga (English: 'Conversation between the Shadow of Argus and the unfamiliar Shadow of a Female'), or popularly Samtal (Conversation), which has become her most known work. As a female journalist, she was rare in Europe and possibly the first identifiable one in Sweden. The essay aroused great attention in contemporary Sweden, but the author was anonymous and unknown during her own lifetime. The essay was published in ten issues in connection with the Riksdag of 1738-1739. Essay papers was a new form of media in contemporary Europe, and hers was among the first to introduce this media form in Sweden. The paper was contemporary to similar publications in Sweden such as Skuggan Af den döda Argus (The Death Shadow of Argus), Samtal, I The Dödas Rijke, Emellan Den Sedo-Lärande Mercurius (Conversation, In the Kingdom of the Dead, With the Instructive Mercurius) and Den Swänska Argus, and was likely inspired by them.

Samtal discussed foreign policy, social policy, morality, and independence and subjects of the Age of Enlightenment. The essay numbers were written in the form of a fictive argumentative conversation - hence the name of the paper - between two fictions figures, the male Argi skugga (Shadow of Argi) and the female Fruentimbers skugga (Shadow of a Female), of various topics. Other characters sometimes participate in the conversation, such as Muselmanen (The Moslem) and Philosophen (The Philosopher). Criticism against the Catholic church within the subject of enlightenment, until then uncommon in Sweden but common in the Netherlands, was often presented. In the conversations, the essay promoted freedom of speech, freedom of religion, advocated to translate knowledge to the Swedish language to make it available to more people rather than to restrict most such literature to foreign languages in the universities, and stated that women should also been given higher education and participate in public debate. In it, she satirizes the letters from some readers who criticize the thought of a woman discussing philosophy. Affected strongly by the continental ideas of enlightenment, it was regarded as radical and progressive and came in conflict with the contemporary censorship laws. It was not banned by the censorship, but discontinued for unknown causes after ten issues in 1739, despite having planned further issues.

During the 18th-century Age of Liberty and the Gustavian Age, there were several publications in Sweden written by and for women which, except for the more common topics of the Age of Enlightenment, discussed and questioned the rights and status of women in society, often written in the form of essays, letters and fictions conversations, of which the publication of Margareta Momma was arguably the first. Most of the female journalists and writers in 18th-century Sweden wrote under pseudonym (normally a French name), and few have been identified.

Momma is also identified as the editor behind the French language edition of the Stockholm Gazette, which she published between 1742 and 1752. In 1772, she died along with her spouse and her remaining son, and the family business was inherited by her daughter Elsa Fougt.

== Legacy ==
The award "Mommapriset - Årets Utgivare" ('Momma Award - The Publisher of the Year') is named after Momma.

== See also ==
- Catharina Ahlgren, another female publisher who wrote about women's rights during the Swedish age of liberty.

== Sources ==
- Samtal emellan Argi Skugga och en obekant Fruentimebers Skugga. Nyligen ankommen til de dödas Rijke (1738–39).
- Stockholm Gazette: redacteur tussen 1742 en 1752.
- Margareta Berger, Pennskaft. Kvinnliga journalister i svensk dagspress 1690-1975 (Stockholm 1977).
- Lisbeth Larsson, ‘Min kære søster og uforlignelige ven! Om 1700-tallets svenske presse og dens fruentimmer tidsskrifter’, in: Eva Haettner Aurelius en Anne-Marie Mai red., Nordisk kvindeliteraturhistorie 1 (Kopenhagen 1993) 427-439.
- Lotte Jensen, ‘Bij uitsluiting voor de vrouwelijke sekse geschikt’. Vrouwentijdschriften en journalistes in Nederland in de achttiende en negentiende eeuw (Hilversum 2001) 55-56.
- Ann Öhrberg, Vittra fruntimmer. Författarroll och retorik hos frihetstidens kvinnliga författare (Uppsala 2001) 165-187, 339-345.
- Mikaela Lirberg en Anna-Karin Skoglund, ‘Ett vittert fruntimmer’. En studie av boktryckaränkor och speciellt fru Fougt (Magisteruppsats i bilioteks- och informationsvetenskap vid bibliotekshögskolan/biblioteks- och informationsvetenskap 2002) 49 [ook op University of Borås].
- Signum Svenska kulturhistoria: Den Gustavianska tiden
- Mikaela Lirberg och Anna-Karin Skoglund: Ett vittert fruntimmer
