= Ulrika Widström =

Swedish poet and translator

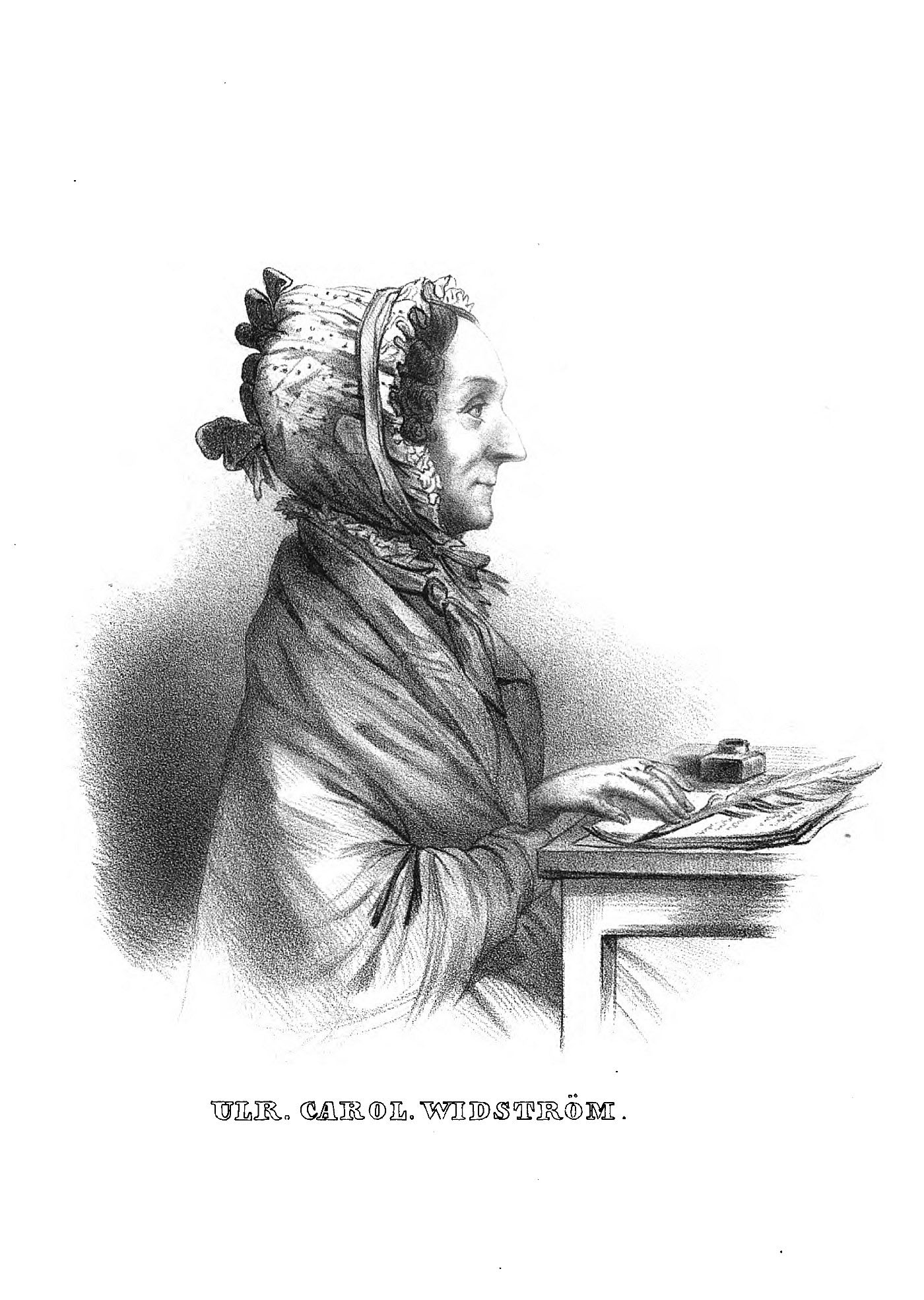
Ulrika Widström

Ulrika Carolina Widström (24 November 1764, in Stockholm – 19 February 1841), was a Swedish poet and translator. She is remembered for her successful collection Erotiska sånger (Erotic songs) which was published in 1799. She was awarded a gold medal by the Swedish Academy for her literary output.

== Early life and education ==
Ulrika Carolina Widström was born to the organ manufacturer Peter Forsberg and Katarina Maria Grip, who both served at the royal palace, on 24 November 1764, in Stockholm. One of her godparents was Charlotta Fredrika von Fersen, lady in waiting to Queen Sofia Magdalena. Thanks to her godmother, Widström was educated in both French and German, and learned languages and music.

== Career ==
Widström debuted as a poet in the 1780s, when she aroused attention by some poems, published in the literary papers of the day. Her breakthrough came by the publication of Erotiska sånger (Erotic songs) in 1799. Her poetry was described as very affected by the Gustavian era. Her collected work was published by Carl Julius Lénström in 1840. This was a success, and was reprinted many times. Widstrom was well known and admired by her contemporaries and artists, such as Carl Gustaf af Leopold, Bengt Lidner, Thomas Thorild and Per Daniel Amadeus Atterbom.

Widström's translations include Matthew G. Lewis's 1796 horror novel The Monk, which she collaborated with Herman Anders Kullberg to translate. Other translated works include F. G. Ducray-Duminil's Victor, ou l’Enfant de la forêt (Victor, a Child of the Forest), published as Victor eller Skogs-Barnet, and Les enfants de l'Abbaye (The Children of the Abbey) by Regina Maria Roche.

She married Sven Widström (d. 1814), a violinist in the royal Capell, in 1790. They had five children together. They suffered financial hardship when the royal orchestra was fired wholesale in 1807. Sven died in 1812, and in 1814, Widström moved to Mariestad, where she opened a girls' finishing school in 1830, run by one of her daughters. She also at times worked as a governess. She was awarded the gold medal of the Swedish Academy in recognition of her literary output in 1841, just before her death.

== See also ==
- Julia Nyberg
