= Elis Schröderheim =

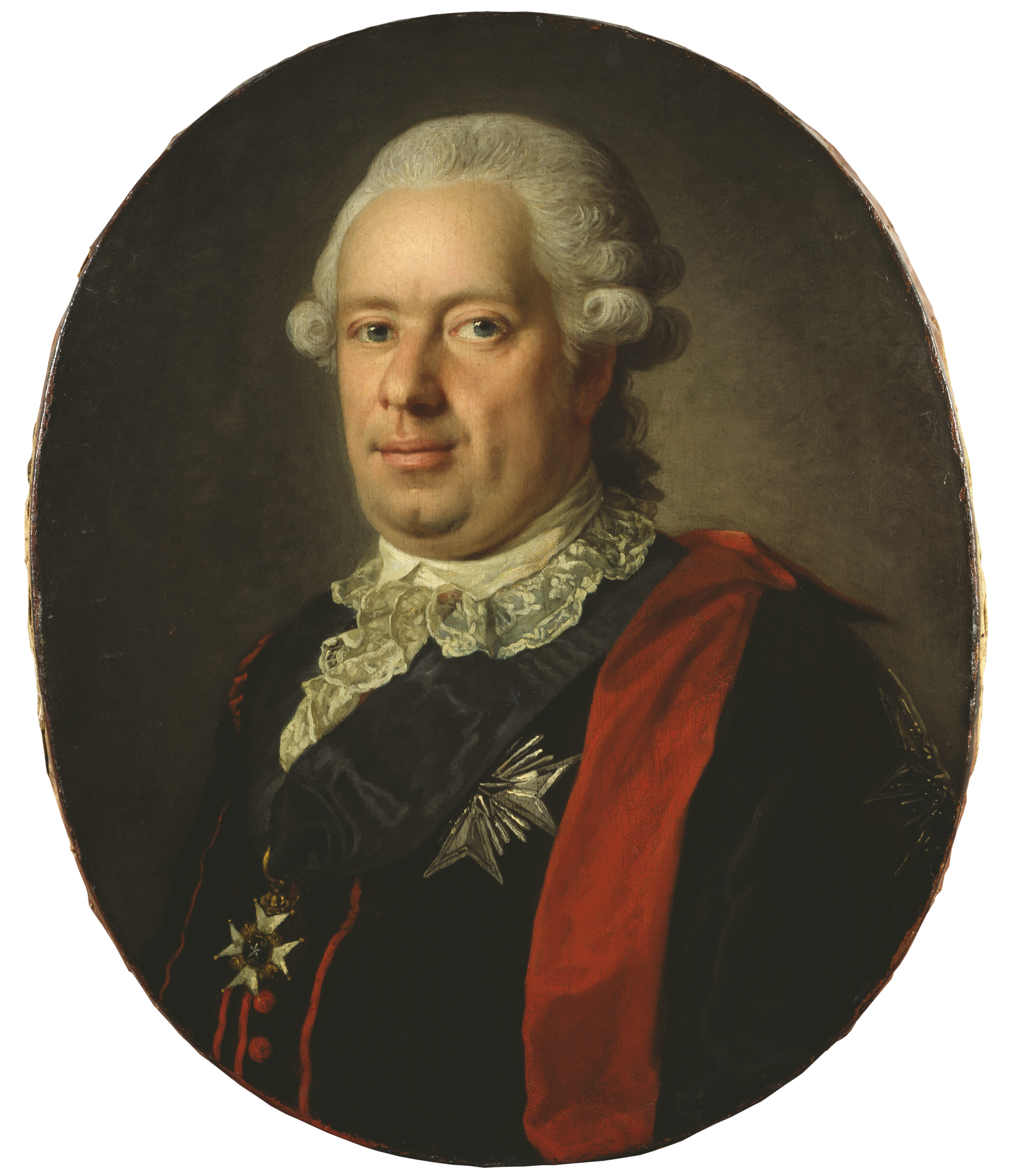
Eli's Schröderheim 1747 - 1795

Elis Schröderheim (26 March 1747, Stockholm – 30 August 1795), was a Swedish official, politician and a member of the Swedish Academy 1786-1795 (chair nr 12) as well as member number 233 of the Royal Swedish Academy of Sciences. He was an influential favorite of Gustav III of Sweden. He was married to the intellectual Anna Charlotta von Stapelmohr.

He was the son of bishop Georg Claes Schröder and Margareta Elisabeth Elis. As was the custom, he was ennobled alongside his siblings for the sake of his father in 1759. From 1764, he pursued a career within civil service. He served as protocol secretary within the royal council 1773, first secretary within the civil office in 1775, Secretary of State in 1782-85, director of the custom service in 1785-91, and governor of Uppsala 1794-95.

Elis Schröderheim was a personal friend of Gustav III from 1768, and his career was favored by the latter after he became monarch in 1771. Gustav appreciated his humor and easy going personality. He had the position of Secretary of State for internal affairs from 1775 until 1785, even if he was only formally given the position in 1782. As confidant of the King, he was reportedly used for all sorts of personal errands. His name was associated with the corruption regarding clerical offices during the reign of Gustav III, as neither him nor the monarch were religious, they did not find it immoral to sell clerical offices, but in 1786, the King was forced by the clergy to give up the plans of making him bishop. He was also a personal friend of Bellman, who at one point served as his secretary.

As a representative of the peasant party during the Riksdag or Assembly of the Estates of 1778 and 1786, he benefited the interests of the monarch. The riksdag of 1786, however, was a failure, and after, his position as favorite was somewhat replaced by Carl Gustaf Nordin.

Cultural offices
Preceded by First holder	Swedish Academy; Seat No.12; 1786-95	Succeeded by Isac Reinhold Blom
