= Anna Laestadius Larsson =

Swedish author and journalist

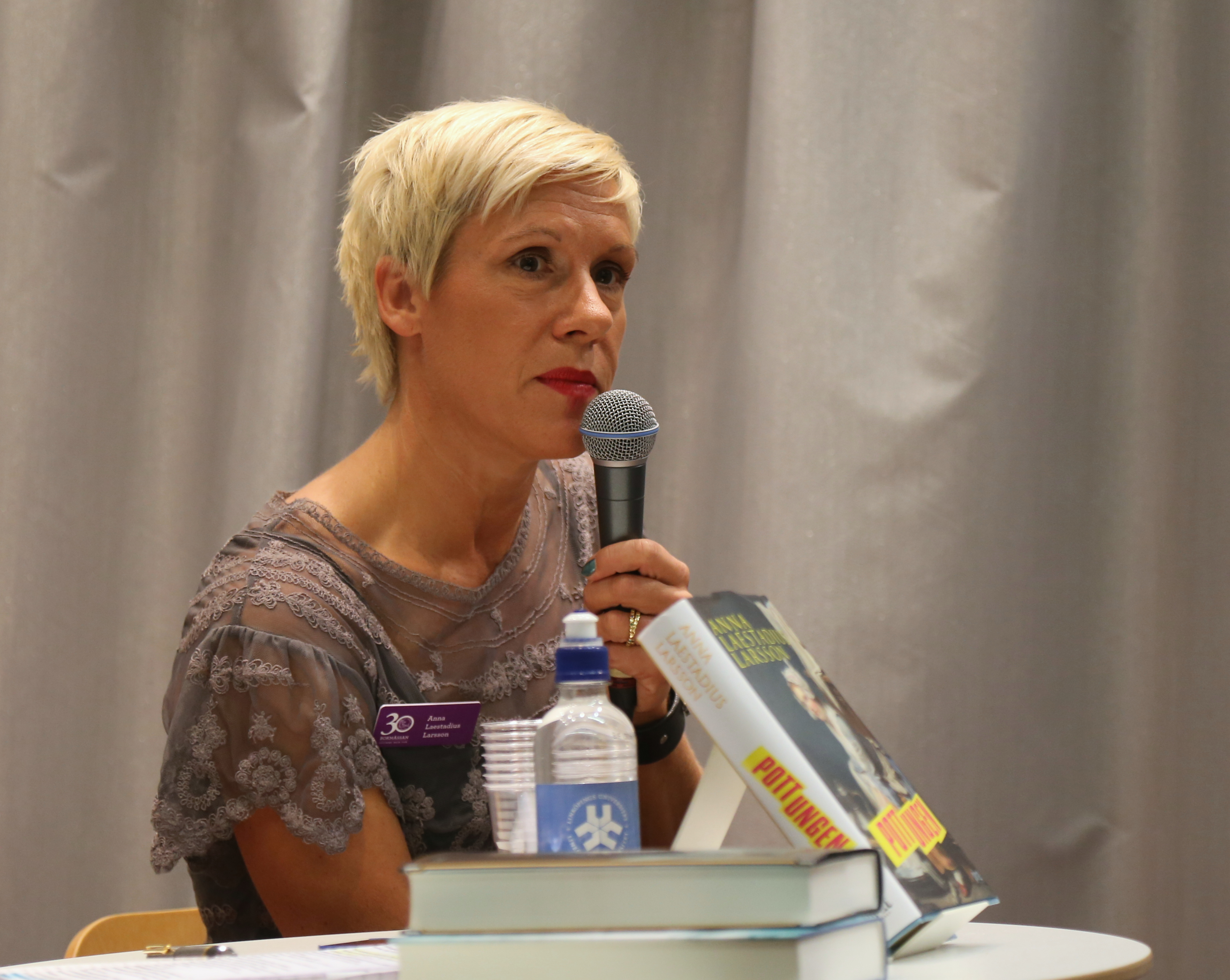
Anna Laestadius Larsson (2014)

Anna Gerd Laestadius Larsson (née Larsson; born 6 April 1966) is a Swedish journalist and historical novelist. She made her debut in 2013 with Barnbruden (The child bride), the first part of a trilogy about 18th-century Swedish women. In 2017, she published the successful novel Hilma: En roman om gåtan Hilma af Klint (Hilma: A novel about the enigma that was Hilma af Klint). Laestadius Larsson has also been editor of the Swedish magazine Amelia as well as a columnist for Svenska Dagbladet.

== Biography ==
Anna Gerd Larsson was born in Leksberg near Mariestad on 6 April 1966. After first working as a reporter for Aftonbladet and Expressen, she was an editor at Aftonbladet Kvinna. In 2007, she went on become a columnist at Svenska Dagbladet where she served for almost 11 years.

Laestadius Larsson was inspired to embark on writing historical novels when she took her nine-year-old daughter to visit Drottningholm Palace. Commenting on a portrait of Hedvig Elisabeth Charlotte, the guide explained that she was only 15 when she was forced to marry the king's brother and that she had kept a diary. Laestadius Larsson bought the nine-volume diary from an antique dealer and based her novel Barnbruden on its 5,000 pages of intrigue. Her novel Kurtisanen (The courtisn, 2019) was based on letters written by Charlotte Eckerman (1759–1790) while on a study trip to Italy.

Her highly acclaimed novel Hilma (2017) received additional interest when Hilma af Klint's paintings were exhibited at the Guggenheim in New York.

== Personal life ==
She is married to the journalist Sverker Laestadius (born 1954) with whom she has one daughter.

== Novels ==
- Barnbruden, Piratförlaget, 2013 ISBN 978-91-642-0394-6
- Pottungen, Piratförlaget, 2014 ISBN 978-91-642-0420-2
- Räfvhonan, Piratförlaget, 2015 ISBN 978-91-642-0454-7
- Hilma – en roman om gåtan Hilma af Klint, Piratförlaget, 2017 ISBN 978-91-642-0489-9
- Kurtisanen, Piratförlaget, 2019 ISBN 978-91-642-0527-8
- Svårmodets döttrar, Piratförlaget, 2020 ISBN 978-91-642-0744-9
