= Carl Gustaf af Leopold =

Swedish poet

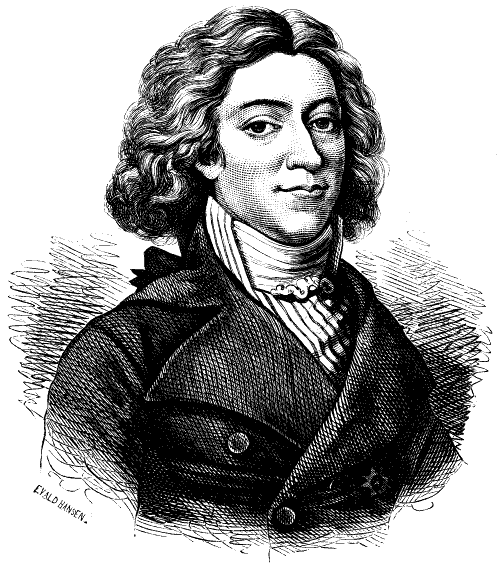

Carl Gustaf af Leopold (1756 in Stockholm – 9 November 1829 in Stockholm) was a Swedish poet.

== Biography ==
He attained distinction in Swedish letters, his first work to attract wide attention being his Ode on the Birth of the Prince-Royal Gustavus Adolphus (1778). He was appointed private secretary to Gustavus III in 1788 and stood high in the regard of that monarch. His odes on the martial achievements of the Swedes were among his most popular productions, and his tragedies Odin (1790) and Virginia (1802) were highly successful. He attempted all forms of poetry save the epic. In 1799 he was made deputy director (Swedish: kansliråd). In 1818 he was appointed State Secretary.

He was a bulwark of French Classicism against the attacks of the Romantic Phosphorists. He has been compared to the German Johann Christoph Gottsched. His Samlade skrifter were published (Vols. I-III, 1800–02; Vols. IV-VI, 1831–33).

== Notes ==
Cultural offices
Preceded by First holder	Swedish Academy, Seat No 16; 1786–1829	Succeeded by Samuel Grubbe
