= Anna Maria Hjärne =

Anna Maria Hjärne née Ehrensvärd (1718–1798) was a Swedish courtier, Chief Court Mistress to the queen of Sweden, Sophia Magdalena of Denmark, from 1766 to 1777.

== Biography ==
Born to Johan Jacob Ehrensvärd and Anna Maria Mannerheim, she married riksråd count Gustaf Adolf Hjärne in 1739. She and her spouse were both known sympathizers of the Hats. During the Age of Liberty, the Hats and Caps often maneuvered to have their sympathizers placed in court offices, and when the office of senior lady in waiting to the crown princess (from 1771 queen) Sophia Magdalena was to be permanently filled after Ulrica Catharina Stromberg in 1766, the Hats managed to have Hjärne appointed to the office. The appointment was however mostly formal: it was understood that Hjärne would only serve during grander occasions, and that the office would in practice be performed by her deputy (first Ernestine Palmfelt, from 1767 Charlotta Sparre).

Hjärne was acceptable to the office because of her status as riksrådinna, wife of a riksråd, but Axel von Fersen the Elder considered her to be unsuitable and not of sufficient character, sense and knowledge in the French language for the office. The conflict between Sophia Magdalena, who had the support of the Cap Party, and her mother-in-law, the Hat Party sympathizer Louisa Ulrika of Prussia was publicly known and disliked, and the sympathies were on Sophia Magdalena's side. Anna Maria Hjärne was a Hat sympathizer and reportedly slandered and spread rumors about Sophia Magdalena.

In the contemporary paper Dagligt Allehanda, a fable was presented about Rävinnan och Turturduvan [The She Fox and the Turtle Dove] in 16 February 1771. The fable was about the innocent Turtle Dove (Sophia Magdalena) who was slandered by the wicked She Fox (Louisa Ulrika), who was supported by the Second She Fox (The Mistress of the Robes Anna Maria Hjärne) and the other Foxes (the nobility). The fable was believed to have been sent from the Caps Party.

During the Revolution of 1772, queen Sophia Magdalena confided to Anna Maria Hjärne that she was afraid that the now all powerful monarch would divorce her because she knew he did not care for her, because she had not given him a child and because she knew she was being slandered before him. King Gustav III was informed of this and confided in Axel von Fersen the Elder that he was contemplating to divorce the queen for pro-Danish plots and adultery with riksråd Fredrik Ribbing, who was known to court her, and the Danish envoy baron Rosencrone, who forwarded letters from her to Denmark. The queen was known to enjoy the company of Ribbing, who amused her with compliments and once made her laugh by caricaturing her senior lady-in-waiting Anna Maria Hjärne, who reportedly told the king that the queen was pregnant "and the riksråd Ribbing is her favorite". The king gave Ulrica Catharina Stromberg, who was very well liked by the queen, the task to examine the statements made by Hjärne. Stromberg reported that she could not bring herself to ask the queen herself, but she did ask her kammarfru Charlotta Hellman, from whom she was given "information that left little doubt, particularly as the clearest evidence could be extracted from the linen of the queen." Axel von Fersen the Elder however, advised against a divorce and stated that there was no other reason to suspect her of pro-Danish views than her affection for her Danish maids Ingrid Maria Wenner and Hansen, and that the understandable pleasure the queen, as a neglected wife, felt for the compliments of Ribbing was not sufficient to suspect her for actual adultery. The whole affair resulted in nothing. When the royal couple consummated their marriage with the assistance of Adolf Fredrik Munck in 1775, the king reportedly apologized to the queen for believing Hjärne's story. Anna Maria Hjärne was replaced in her office by Ulrika Strömfelt in 1777.

Court offices
Preceded by Ulrica Catharina Stromberg	Överhovmästarinna to Sophia Magdalena of Denmark; 1766–1771	Succeeded by Ulrika Strömfelt
Preceded by Brita Christina Sparre	Överhovmästarinna to the Queen of Sweden; 1771–1777	Succeeded by Ulrika Strömfelt
