= Maria Aurora Uggla =

Swedish lady in waiting and noble

Maria Aurora Uggla, married name Ehrengranat (1747–1826), was a Swedish lady in waiting and noble. She was the lady in waiting and confidant of the Swedish Queen, Sophia Magdalena of Denmark, and later the head of the court of Crown Prince Gustav Adolf.

== Life ==
Maria Aurora Uggla was the daughter of nobleman Clas Fredrik Uggla and Anna Magdalena Hierta. She was appointed as a maid of honor to Sophia Magdalena upon her arrival to Sweden in 1766, and was one of the three ladies to carry the train of Sophia Magdalena in the second marriage ceremony in the Royal Palace, Stockholm, on 4 November 1766. Uggla is described as the trusted favorite and close confidant of Sophia Magdalena: otherwise very reserved and with few friends, the Queen is reported to have given Uggla her trust and followed her advice. The only other lady in waiting the queen is said to have been close to, was Virginia Charlotta Manderström.

As a person, Uggla is described as gifted and cultivated, although sometimes sharp. Maria Aurora Uggla was the star of the amateur theater of the royal court and recognized and regarded for her dramatic talent: she and Caroline Lewenhaupt are described as the primadonnas of the amateur theater of the royal court of Gustav III. Already in 1767, she is mentioned to have participated in the performance given at Ulriksdal Palace to the birthday of Sophia Magdalena. In 1774, she was ordered by the king to instruct Charlotte Eckerman in the part of Mechtild in the opera Birger jarl by Gyllenborg and Adlerbeth, after the part had been refused by Elisabeth Olin. Charlotte Eckerman made a great success in the part at the Royal Opera in Stockholm, and was called in by the audience. Prince Charles started to shout: "Miss Uggla! Miss Uggla!", after which the audience applauded also Maria Aurora Uggla in her box as well as the author Gyllenborg for having instructed Eckerman in the part.

Uggla was first considered as a messenger when the King decided to reconcile with the Queen in 1775 in order to consummate the marriage, but instead, Count Adolf Fredrik Munck af Fulkila was chosen, having then a relationship with the Queen's chamber maid Anna Sofia Ramström. After the Queen gave birth to the Crown Prince in 1778, however, there were rumours that the father of the child was Munck. In the diary entry of Hedwig Elizabeth Charlotte of Holstein-Gottorp in June 1778, Uggla was quoted as saying in a private conversation:

"In any case, even if we for just a moment were to assume, that the child was truly illegitimate, then what difference would it make to the King? He will still always regard it as his own. And the matter may also very well be meaningless, as long as Sweden is provided with an heir."

Maria Aurora Uggla married noble Colonel lieutenant Karl Adam Ehrengranath in 1778. Gjörwell noted about her at her wedding: "The Queen gave her 20.000 $ in dowry and a pension of 6.000 $ for life. She has so to speak been the only friend of the Queen and the one, to whom Her Majesty has kept an unlimited confidence."

In 1778, she was appointed one of the two deputy överhovmästarinna or heads of the court of the Crown Prince (in effect sub-royal governess) under Hedvig Sofia von Rosen. Uggla, as well as her former colleague Virginia Manderström, continued to be the favorite and close friend of the Queen until her death. At the coup which deposed King Gustav IV Adolf of Sweden, the son of Sophia Magdalena, in 1809, Uggla was the one to first notify Sophia Magdalena of what had happened. In her company, Sophia Magdalena attempted to gain access to her son, but was prevented by guards. When she was prevented from seeing her son, she burst in tears in the arms of Uggla. Maria Aurora Uggla was present at the deathbed of Sophia Magdalena in 1813.

== In fiction ==
Maria Aurora Uggla is portrayed in the novel Drottningens förtrogna (The Queens Confidante) by Anna Sparre (1994).

She was portrayed by Sanna Mari Patjas in The Marriage of Gustav III, 2001.
