= Ulrica Catharina Stromberg =

Swedish courtier (1710–1777)

Ulrica Catharina Stromberg (1710-1777) was a Swedish courtier; överhovmästarinna (Mistress of the Robes) to the queen of Sweden, Louisa Ulrika of Prussia, from 1754 to 1761.

Born to count Carl Julius Lewenhaupt and Christina Gustaviana Horn af Marienborg, she married riksråd count Claës Stromberg in 1732. The couple had one daughter. Stromberg served as hovfröken (maid of honour) to queen Ulrika Eleonora of Sweden prior to her marriage, from 1726 until 1732. In 1754, when Carl Gustaf Tessin and Ulla Tessin lost their court offices as royal governor and mistress of the robes respectively, Claës Stromberg and Ulrica Catharina Stromberg replaced them in these offices. She served as mistress of the robes to queen Louisa Ulrika for seven years until 1761, when she retired in favor of Ulrika Juliana Gyllenstierna.

Five years later, in 1766, Stromberg was appointed temporary mistress of the robes to the new crown princess, Sophia Magdalena of Denmark, who arrived to Sweden to marry Gustav III of Sweden that year. This was a purely temporary position however: she was given the task to head the newly appointed Swedish court of the new crown princess upon her arrival in Helsingborg and then accompany her during her trip through Sweden to her wedding in Stockholm, after which she was replaced by the permanent mistress of the robes, Anna Maria Hjärne, and her deputy Ernestine Palmfelt. During her short service, however, Sophia Magdalena was given such a good impression by Stromberg that she often mentioned her good qualities in conversation to others, and repeatedly expressed a wish to visit her (requests which was however denied by her mother-in-law).

During the Revolution of 1772, queen Sophia Magdalena confided to Anna Maria Hjärne that she was afraid that the now all powerful monarch would divorce her because she knew he did not care for her, because she had not given him a child and because she knew she was being slandered before him. King Gustav III was informed of this and confided in Axel von Fersen the Elder that he was contemplating to divorce the queen for pro-Danish plots and adultery with riksråd Fredrik Ribbing, who was known to court her, and the Danish envoy baron Rosencrone, who forwarded letters from her to Denmark. The queen was known to enjoy the company of Ribbing, who amused her with compliments and once made her laugh by caricaturing her senior lady-in-waiting Anna Maria Hjärne, who reportedly told the king that the queen was pregnant "and the riksråd Ribbing is her favorite". The king gave Ulrica Catharina Stromberg, who was very well liked by the queen, the task to examine the statements made by Hjärne. Stromberg reported that she could not bring herself to ask the queen herself, but she did ask her kammarfru Charlotta Hellman, from whom she was given "information that left little doubt, particularly as the clearest evidence could be extracted from the linen of the queen." Axel von Fersen the Elder however, advised against a divorce and stated that there was no other reason to suspect her of pro-Danish views than her affection for her Danish maids Ingrid Maria Wenner and Hansen, and that the understandable pleasure the queen, as a neglected wife, felt for the compliments of Ribbing was not sufficient to suspect her for actual adultery. The whole affair resulted in nothing. When the royal couple consummated their marriage with the assistance of Adolf Fredrik Munck in 1775, the king reportedly apologized to the queen for believing Hjärne's story. Anna Maria Hjärne was replaced in her office by Ulrika Strömfelt in 1777.

Court offices
Preceded by Ulla Tessin	Överhovmästarinna to the Queen of Sweden; 1754–1761	Succeeded by Ulrica Juliana Gyllenstierna
Preceded by	Överhovmästarinna to Sophia Magdalena of Denmark; 1766–1766	Succeeded by Anna Maria Hjärne
