= The Marriage of Gustav III =

- Also known as: Gustav III:s äktenskap
- Country of origin: Sweden
- Original language: Swedish
- No. of episodes: 2

Original release
- Network: SVT
- Release: 25 December – 26 December 2001

The Marriage of Gustav III (Swedish: Gustav III:s äktenskap) is a Swedish television series in two parts built upon a period in the life of King Gustav III of Sweden. The series aired in 2001. The director was Marcus Olsson and the manuscript writer was Klas Östergren.

== Plot ==
The series takes place at the royal Swedish court in the 1770s in the Royal Palace, Stockholm, and Ekolsund Castle. The plot portrays the famous event in 1775 when the King, after nine years of marriage, decides to consummate his marriage with the Queen in order to provide an heir to the throne. The reconciliation between the royal couple is managed by Stable master Adolf Fredrik Munck af Fulkila and, though the event is followed by success in 1778, it resulted in a scandal where the legitimacy of the Crown Prince is questioned by the mother of the King.

== Reception ==
The series won the prize of best Television series, the Prix Europa, in 2002.

== Cast ==
- Jonas Karlsson - Konung Gustav III
- Iben Hjejle - Queen Sophia Magdalena of Denmark
- Stefan Gödicke - Duke Charles
- Harald Lönnbro - Prince Frederick Adolf of Sweden
- Evabritt Strandberg - Dowager Queen Louisa Ulrika of Prussia
- Rebecka Englund - Mamsell Anna Sofia Ramström
- Magnus Roosmann - Stable master Adolf Fredrik Munck af Fulkila
- Tomas Bolme - Riksråd Ulrik Scheffer
- Hans Wigren - Elis Schröderheim
- Brasse Brännström - Royal Medicus Bäck
- Malin Lundgren - Princess Sophie Albertine of Sweden
- Sanna Mari Patjas - Maria Aurora Uggla
- Björn Wahlberg - Gustaf Mauritz Armfelt
