= Bertha von Meduna =

Baroness and Chamber Woman of ArchduchessSophie of Austria

Bertha Baroness von Meduna (27 September 1836 – 5 September 1899) was Chamber Woman at the royal court of Princess Sophie of Bavaria, who was the Archduchess of Austria and mother of Emperor Franz Joseph I of Austria.

== Biography ==
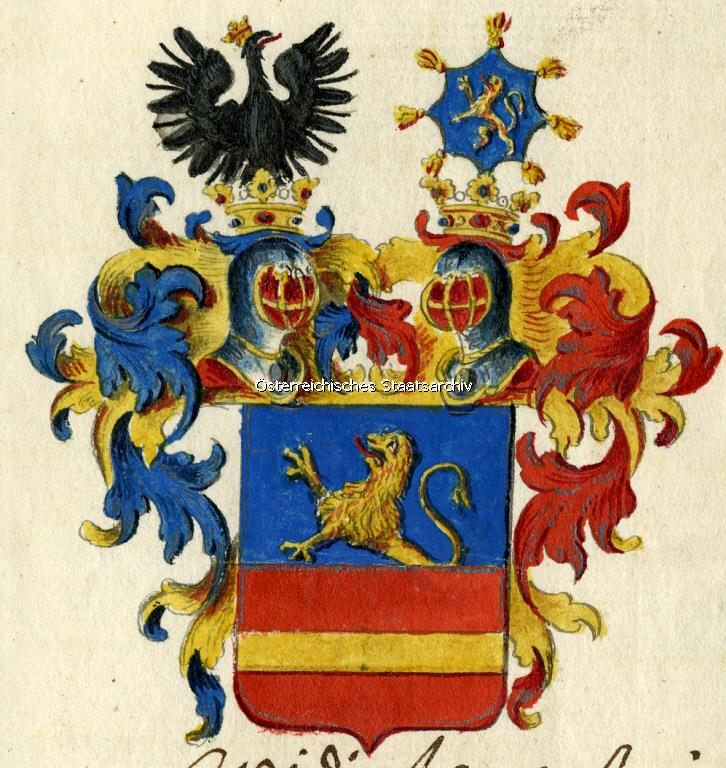
Negelin von Blumenfeld coat of arms

Born as Bertha Barbara Karolina Aloisia Freifrau Negelin von Blumenfeld in Dornbach, Vienna, on 27 September 1836, she was the daughter of Alois Negelin Ritter von Blumenfeld and Karolina Elisabeth Charlotte Anna Theresia Wiese. The nobility of the family dates back to a certain Franz Joseph Negelin, son of Johann Baptist Negele, who ascended in the service of Empress Maria Theresa. As member of the Austrian Imperial Council, Negelin was awarded the nobility title von Blumenfeld in 1763 and knighthood in 1767.

She served as lady's maid and Chamber Woman at the court of Archduchess Sophie from 1854 until her death in 1872, received from the Archduchess an estate in St. Christophen, Neulengbach, and was awarded by Emperor Franz Joseph a Golden Cross of Merit with the Crown in 1898.

On 25 November 1874 she married Josef Meduna (19 March 1842, Chrudim – 14 May 1913, St. Christophen), property owner and mayor of St. Christophen and descendant of the East-Bohemian branch of the Meduna family.

The Meduna family had their home and property in St. Christophen at the end of Schubertgasse, which is now surrounded by the houses of the new "Meduna settlement". The Meduna-Marterl, a wayside shrine on the former Meduna property commemorates the plague year of 1713 in which 27 people died.

After her death on 5 September 1899, her husband erected a family crypt (topped by a 3-meter tall chapel) at the south-western perimeter of the cemetery in St. Christophen, on parcel 14/4. It contains a prayer stool Baroness Meduna had received from Archduke Franz Karl of Austria after Archduchess Sophie's death in 1872. The stool was made from the headboard of the bed in which the old Emperor's mother died and is decorated with a reproduction of Raphael's Madonna della Seggiola.

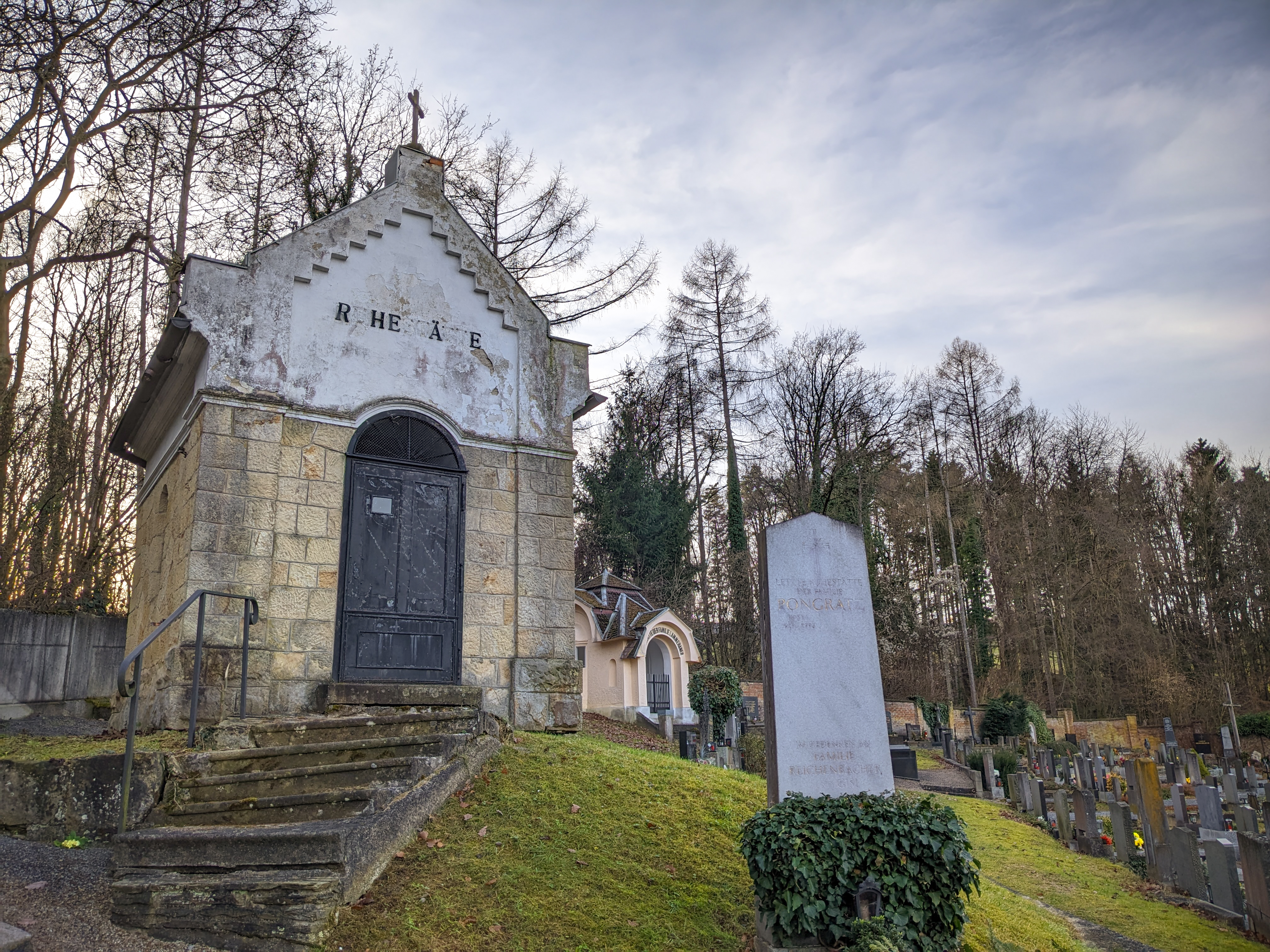
Meduna family "Ruhestätte" (resting place) towering over the cemetery

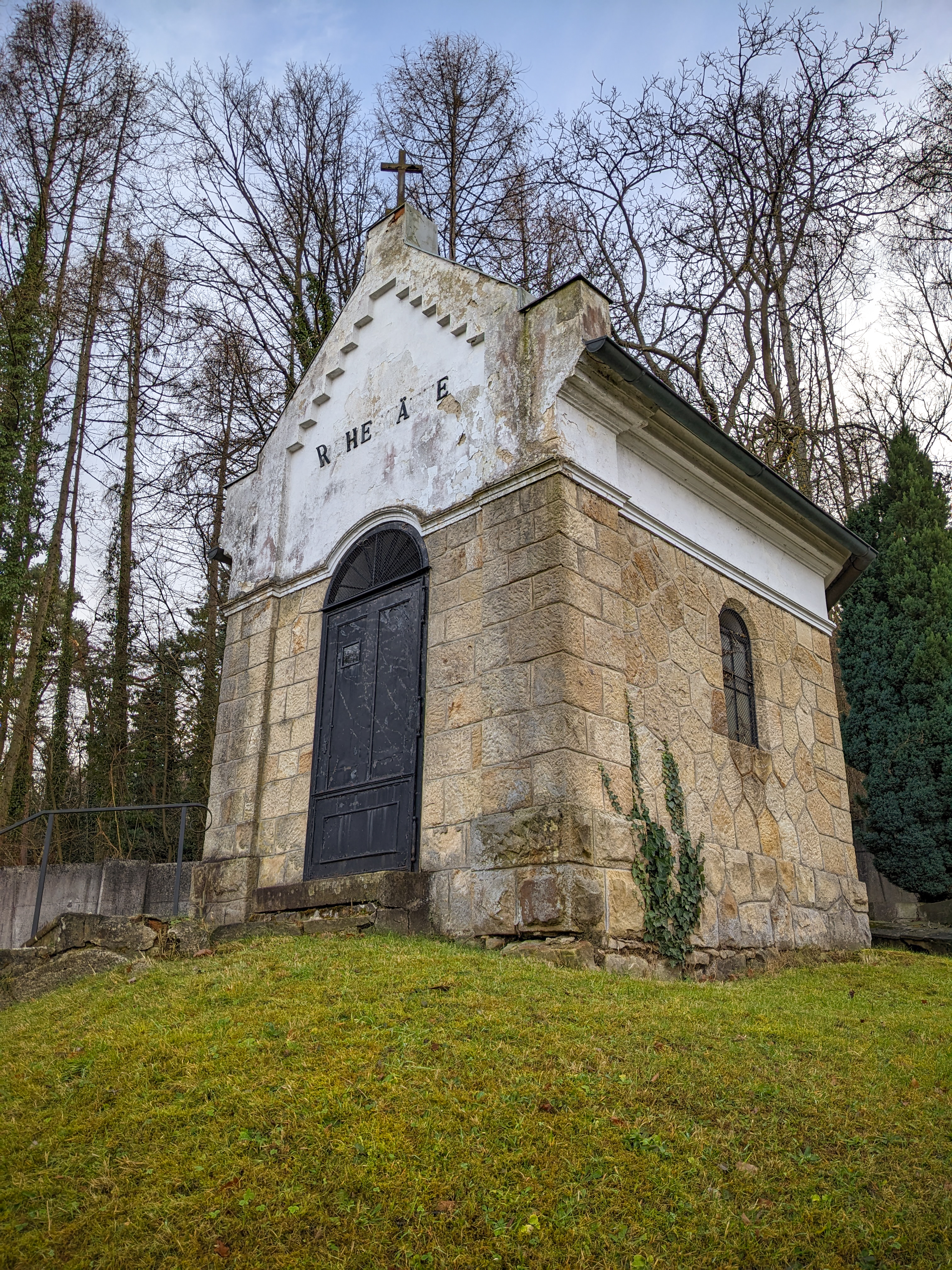
St. Christophen, Neulengbach

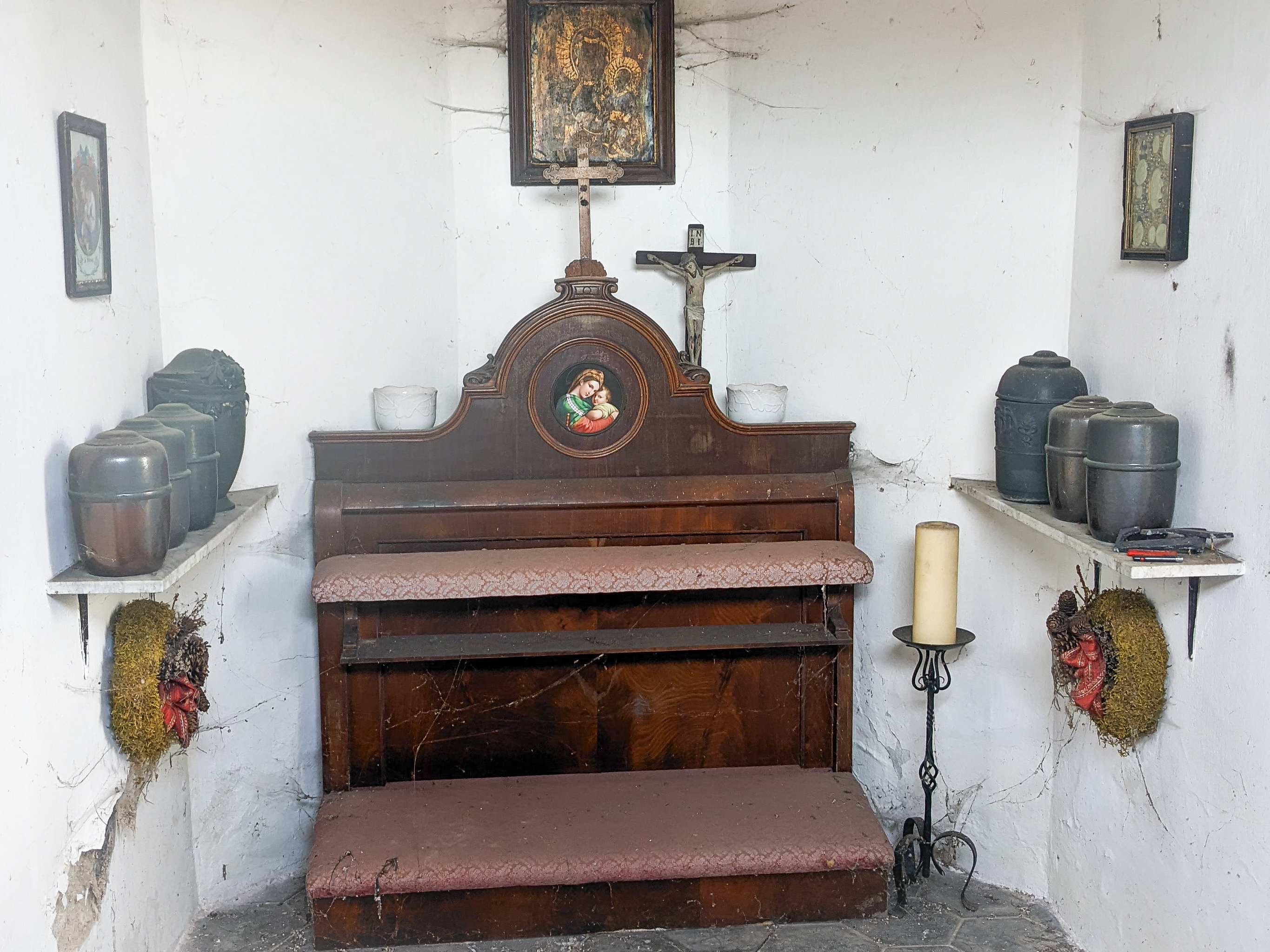
Prayer stool made from the headboard of Archduchess Sophie's deathbed

A prayer book containing a manual inscription and dedication of the Archduchess was also placed in Baroness Meduna's crypt chapel:

German

Auf Dich, O Herr! habe ich gehoffet, ich werde in Ewigkeit nicht zu Schanden werden; in Deiner Gerechtigkeit befreie mich.

Neige zu mir Dein Ohr, eile mich zu erretten, sei mir mein Gott und mein Beschützer, und ein Haus der Zuflucht: damit Du mich selig machest.

Nur in der Religion ist wahrer unvergänglicher Trost zu finden für alle Leiden und Drangsale dieses Lebens.

Zur Erinnerung an Deine treue Schwester
25. Oktober 1855. Sophie.

Translation:
English

To you, Oh Lord! I hoped for eternity not to be disgraced; in Your righteousness deliver me.

Incline Your ear to me, make haste to save me, be my God and my protector, and a house of refuge: so that You may blessed me make.

Only in religion can true, everlasting consolation be found for all the sufferings and tribulations of this life.

In memory of Your faithful sister
25 October 1855. Sophie.
