= Charlotte Manderström =

Swedish lady in waiting and noble

Virginia Charlotta "Charlotte" Manderström, née Duwall (1748–1816), was a Swedish lady in waiting and noble. She was the lady in waiting and favorite of the Swedish Queen consort, Sophia Magdalena of Denmark.

She was born to the noble Carl Erik Duwall and Virginia Lucretia Duwall. Prior to her marriage, she served as maid of honor to queen Sophia Magdalena. Manderström and her colleague, Maria Aurora Uggla, has been described as the two closest friends and confidants of the queen, who otherwise lived a very reclusive and solitary life with few close friends. It is noted that the famed Sophie Hagman was employed as her maid prior to becoming the mistress of Prince Frederick Adolph.

In 1773, she married the courtier Baron Christopher Manderström. By marriage, she automatically lost her office of maid of honor and reportedly feared that she would be sent away. Louise Meijerfeldt wrote about this episode in a letter to Brita Horn that year, that Manderström: "state that she is quite disposed to let herself lose, if there were but one who would take advantage of the opportunity. She is in despair to lose a chance which may not return for a long time, as her husband has the inclination to send her to the country, were the fair lady would be forced to remain, while he himself return to Stockholm." However, though she had no longer a court office herself, Charlotte Manderström managed to stay at court and continue to participate in court life, being married to a man with a court office and herself having the informal position of a favorite to the queen.

Manderström had dramatic talent and often played the main parts in the popular amateur theater in the royal court, alongside Uggla and Caroline Lewenhaupt. Duchess Charlotte claims in her famous journal that it was the task of Manderström to keep the queen updated about everything in the life of the royal court and aristocratic high society life. Manderström is often mentioned as the companion in the queen during periods when the later preferred to isolate herself, such as during the journey of the King to Italy and France in 1783-84, when Duchess Charlotte as well as Axel von Fersen the Elder remarked that the queen isolated herself with "her favorite" Baroness Manderström. Her intimate friendship with the queen is also demonstrated by the fact that she participated in the private Christmas dinner of royal family in 1789, when the only other participators were the king, the queen, the crown prince and the governor of the crown prince. She was regarded as influential over the queen: during the conflict between the king and the queen in 1786, when Sophia Magdalena refused to participate in representation as a protest to the king's favoritism of Gustaf Mauritz Armfelt, it was Manderström and Adolf Fredrik Munck who were given the task to mediate between the royal couple.

Charlotta Manderström and Maria Aurora Uggla continued as the closest companions of Sophia Magdalena also after she was widowed by the king in 1792. According to the diary of Duchess Charlotte, they were practically her only private guests during her widowhood, alongside Caroline Lewenhaupt and Hedvig Eva De la Gardie. Manderström and Uggla were both present at her death in 1813.
