= Sophia Magdalena of Denmark =

Queen of Sweden from 1771 to 1792

Sophia Magdalena
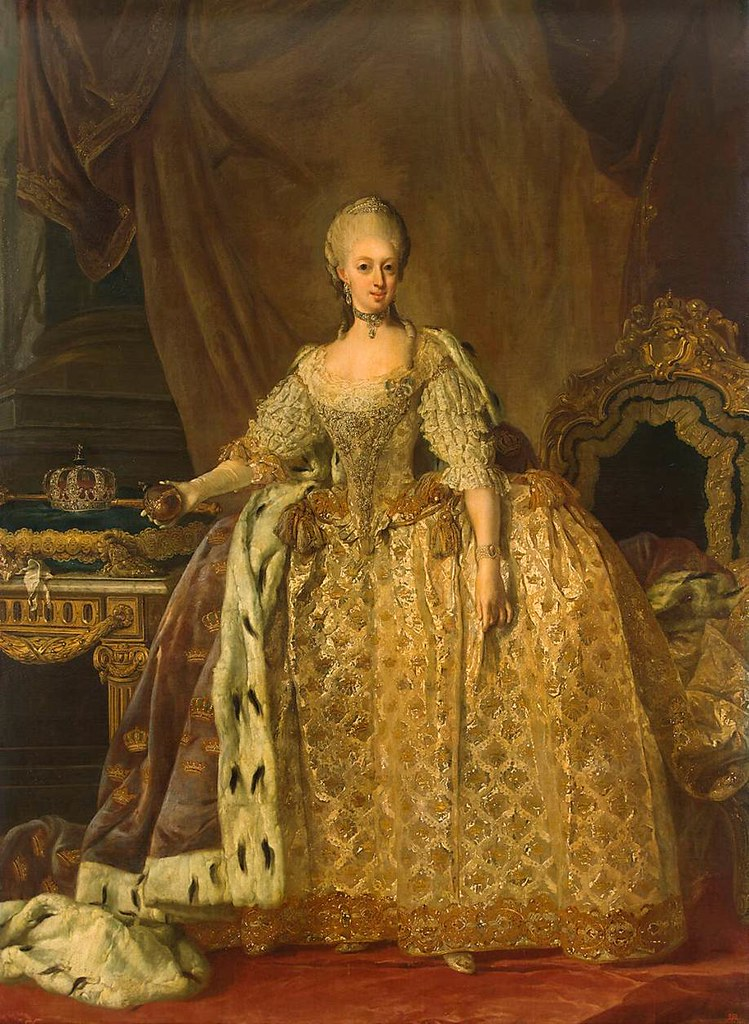
- State portrait of Sophia Magdalena by Lorens Pasch the Younger, c. 1773–1775

Queen consort of Sweden
- Tenure: 12 February 1771 – 29 March 1792
- Coronation: 29 May 1772
- Born: 3 July 1746; Charlottenborg Palace, Copenhagen, Denmark
- Died: 21 August 1813 (aged 67); Ulriksdal Palace, Sweden
- Burial: Riddarholmen Church
- Spouse: Gustav III of Sweden (m. 1766; died 1792)
- Issue In detail: Gustav IV Adolf of Sweden; Prince Carl Gustav, Duke of Småland
- House: Oldenburg
- Father: Frederick V of Denmark
- Mother: Louise of Great Britain

Sophia Magdalena of Denmark (Danish: Sophie Magdalene; Swedish: Sofia Magdalena; 3 July 1746 – 21 August 1813) was Queen of Sweden from 1771 to 1792 as the wife of King Gustav III.

Born into the House of Oldenburg, the royal family of Denmark–Norway, Sophia Magdalena was the first daughter of King Frederick V of Denmark and Norway and his first consort, Princess Louise of Great Britain. Already at the age of five, she was betrothed to Gustav, the heir apparent to the throne of Sweden, as part of an attempt to improve the traditionally tense relationship between the two Scandinavian realms. She was subsequently brought up to be the Queen of Sweden, and they married in 1766. In 1771, Sophia's husband ascended to the throne and became King of Sweden, making Sophia Queen of Sweden. Their coronation was on 29 May 1772.

The politically arranged marriage was unsuccessful. The desired political consequences for the mutual relations between the two countries did not materialize, and on a personal level the union also proved to be unhappy. Sophia Magdalena was of a quiet and serious nature, and found it difficult to adjust to her husband's pleasure seeking court. She dutifully performed her ceremonial duties but did not care for social life and was most comfortable in quiet surroundings with a few friends. However, she was liked by many in the Caps party, believing she was a symbol of virtue and religion. The relationship between the spouses improved somewhat in the years from 1775 to 1783, but subsequently deteriorated again.

After her husband was assassinated in 1792, Sophia Magdalena withdrew from public life, and led a quiet life as dowager queen until her death in 1813.

== Early life ==
=== Birth and family ===
Princess Sophia Magdalena was born on 3 July 1746 at her parents' residence Charlottenborg Palace, located at the large square, Kongens Nytorv, in central Copenhagen. She was the second child and first daughter of Crown Prince Frederick of Denmark and his first consort, the former Princess Louise of Great Britain, and was named for her grandmother, Queen Sophie Magdalene. She received her own royal household at birth.

Just one month after her birth, her grandfather King Christian VI died, and Princess Sophia Magdalena's father ascended the throne as King Frederick V. She was the heir presumptive to the throne of Denmark from the death of her elder brother in 1747 until the birth of her second brother in 1749, and retained her status as next in line to the Danish throne after her brother until her marriage. She was therefore often referred to as Crown Princess of Denmark.

=== Childhood and engagement ===
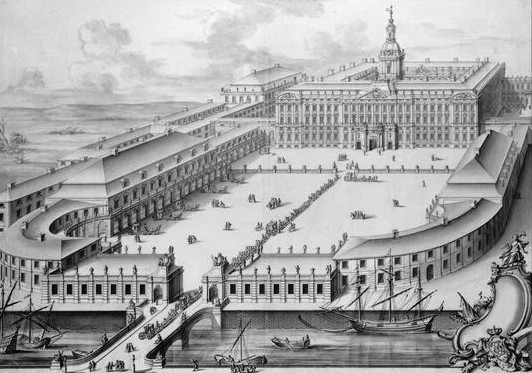
Sophia Magdalena's childhood home, Christiansborg Palace in Copenhagen, c. 1750.

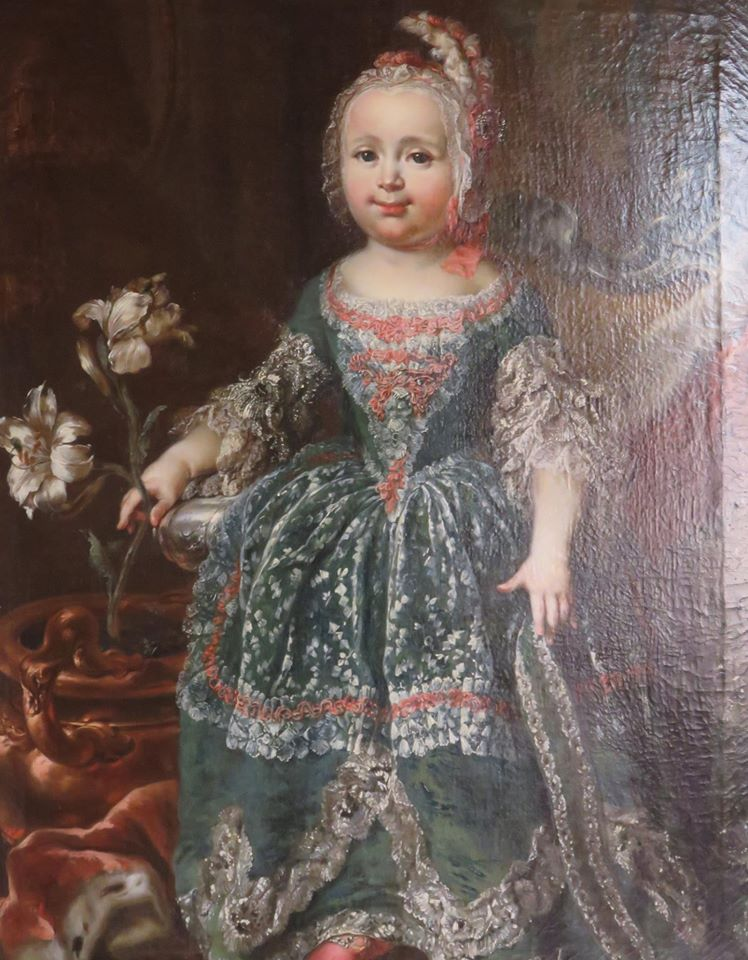
Portrait of Sophia Magdalena as a child, 1750

In the spring of 1751, at the age of five, she was betrothed to Gustav, the heir apparent to the throne of Sweden, and she was brought up to be the Queen of Sweden. The marriage was arranged by the Riksdag of the Estates, not by the Swedish royal family. The marriage was arranged as a way of creating peace between Sweden and Denmark, which had a long history of war and which had strained relations following the election of an heir to the Swedish throne in 1743, where the Danish candidate had lost. The engagement was met with some worry from Queen Louise, who feared that her daughter would be mistreated by the Queen of Sweden, Louisa Ulrika of Prussia. The match was known to be disliked by the Queen of Sweden, who was in constant conflict with the Parliament; and who was known in Denmark for her pride, dominant personality and hatred of anything Danish, which she demonstrated in her treatment of the Danish ambassadors in Stockholm.

After the death of her mother early in her life, Sophia Magdalena was given a very strict and religious upbringing by her grandmother and her stepmother, who considered her father and brother to be morally degenerate. She is noted to have had good relationships with her siblings, her grandmother and her stepmother; her father, however, often frightened her when he came before her drunk, and was reportedly known to set his dogs upon her, causing in her a lifelong phobia.

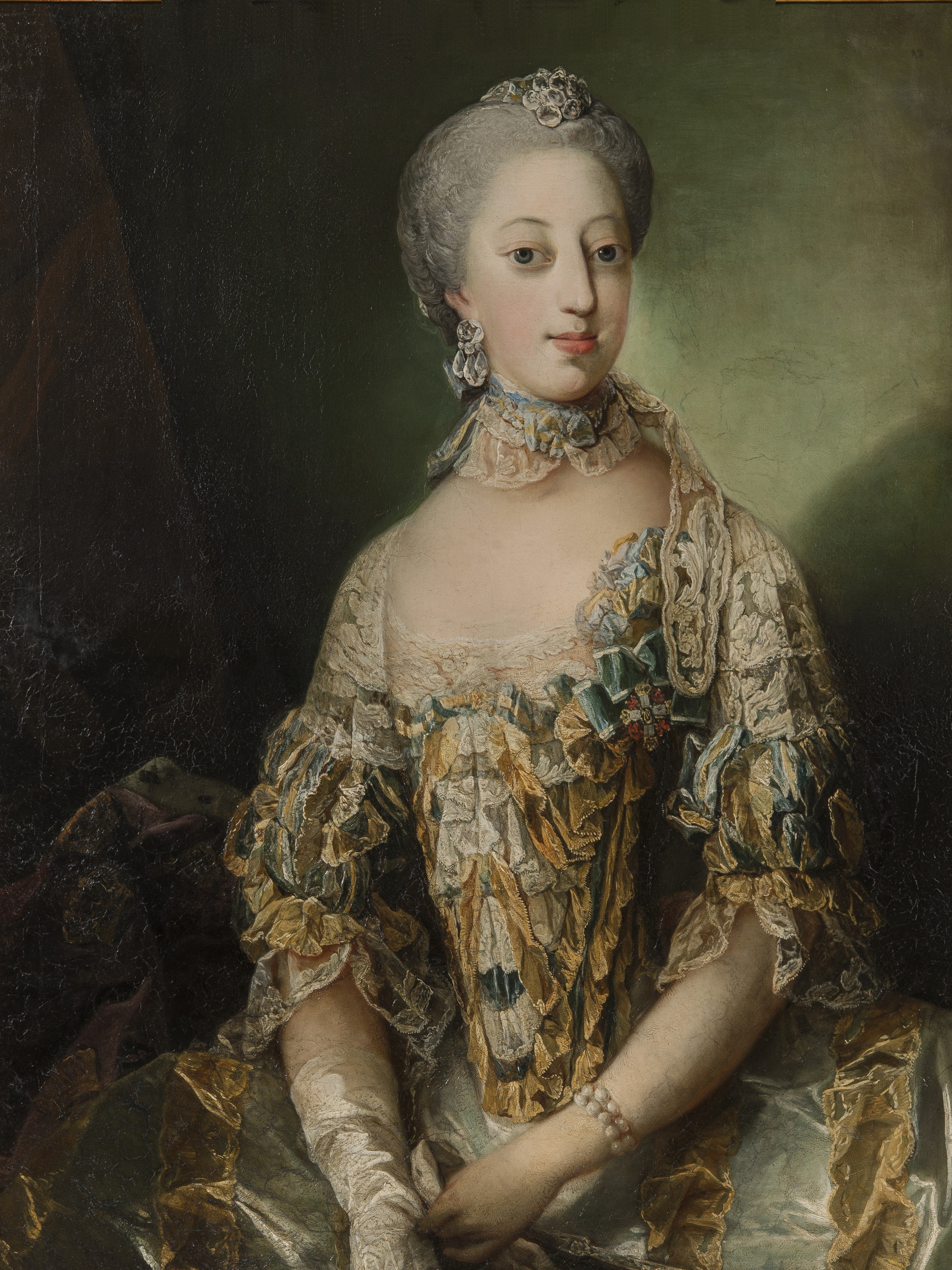
Sophia Magdalena, depicted in a portrait by Carl Gustaf Pilo, c. 1765

In 1760, the betrothal was again brought up by Denmark, which regarded it as a matter of prestige. The negotiations were made between Denmark and the Swedish Queen, as King Adolf Frederick of Sweden was never considered to be of any more than purely formal importance. Louisa Ulrika favored a match between Gustav and her niece Philippine of Brandenburg-Schwedt instead, and claimed that she regarded the engagement to be void and forced upon her by Carl Gustaf Tessin. She negotiated with Catherine the Great and her brother Frederick the Great to create some political benefit for Denmark in exchange for a broken engagement. However, the Swedish public was very favorable to the match due to expectations Sophia Magdalena would be like the last Danish-born Queen of Sweden, Ulrika Eleonora of Denmark, who was very loved for her kindness and charity. This view was supported by the Caps political party, which expected Sophia Magdalena to be an example of a virtuous and religious representative of the monarchy in contrast to the haughty Louisa Ulrika. Fredrick V of Denmark was also eager to complete the match: "His Danish Majesty could not have the interests of his daughter sacrificed because of the prejudices and whims of the Swedish Queen". In 1764 Crown Prince Gustav, who was at this point eager to free himself from his mother and form his own household, used the public opinion to state to his mother that he wished to honor the engagement, and on 3 April 1766, the engagement was officially celebrated.

When a portrait of Sophia Magdalena was displayed in Stockholm, Louisa Ulrika commented: "why Gustav, you seem to be already in love with her! She looks stupid", after which she turned to Prince Charles and added: "She would suit you better!"

== Crown Princess of Sweden ==
=== Marriage ===
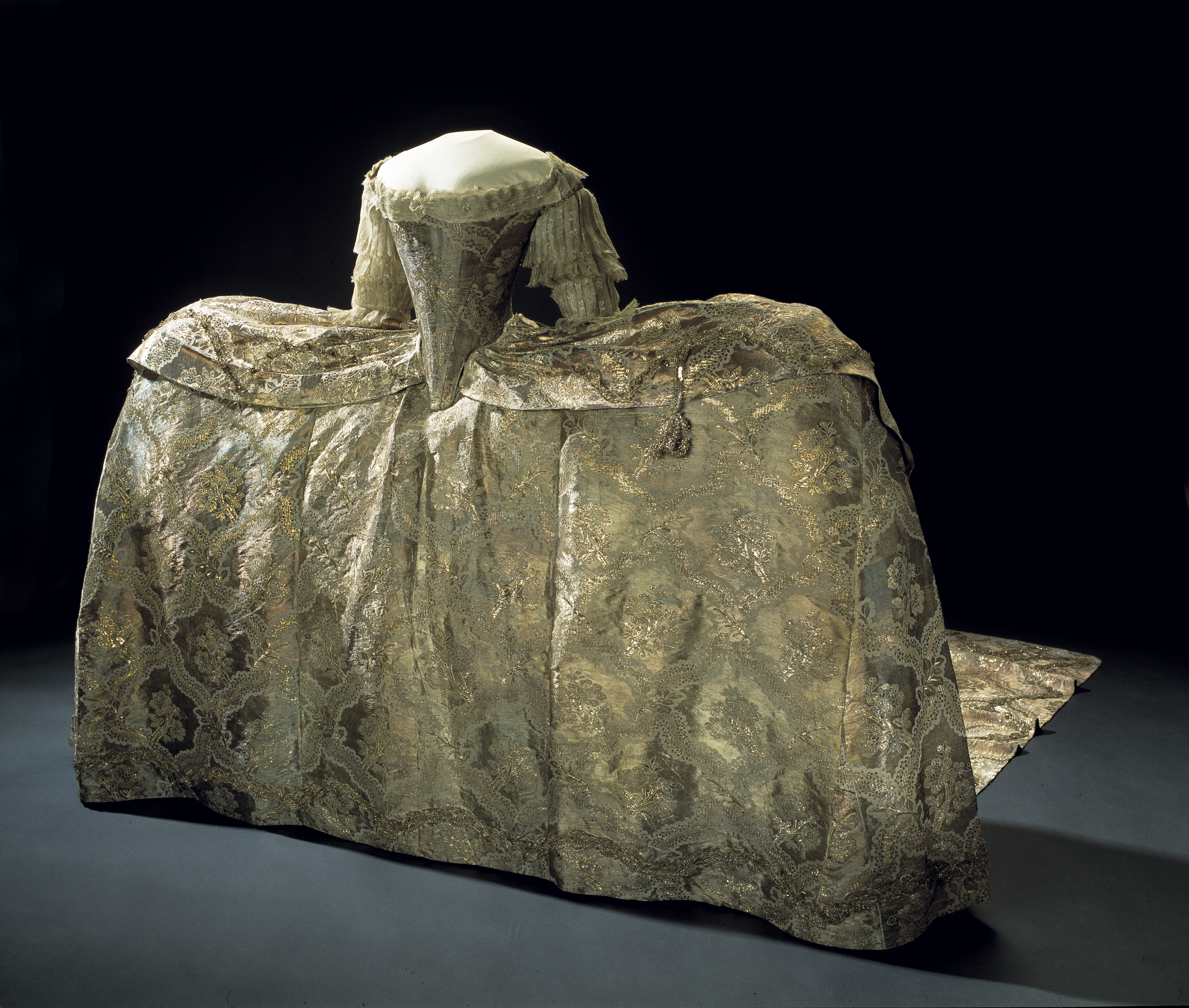
Wedding dress of Sophia Magdalena (Livrustkammaren).

On 1 October 1766, Sophia Magdalena was married to Gustav by proxy at Christiansborg Palace in Copenhagen with her brother Frederick, Hereditary Prince of Denmark, as representative of her groom. She traveled in the royal golden sloop from Kronborg in Denmark over Öresund to Hälsingborg in Sweden; when she was halfway, the Danish cannon salute ended, and the Swedish started to fire. In Helsingborg, she was welcomed by her brother-in-law Prince Charles of Hesse, who had crossed the sea shortly before her, the Danish envoy in Stockholm, Baron Schack, as well as Crown Prince Gustav himself. As she was about to set foot on ground, Gustav was afraid that she would fall, and he therefore reached her his hand with the words: "Watch out, Madame!", a reply which quickly became a topic of gossip at the Swedish court.

The couple then traveled by land toward Stockholm, being celebrated on the way. She met her father-in-law the King and her brothers-in-law at Stäket Manor on 27 October, and she continued to be well-treated and liked by them all during her life in Sweden. Thereafter, she met her mother-in-law the Queen and her sister-in-law at Säby Manor, and on the 28th, she was formally presented for the Swedish royal court at Drottningholm Palace. At this occasion, Countess Ebba Bonde noted that the impression about her was: "By God, how beautiful she is!", but that her appearance was affected by the fact that she had a: "terrible fear of the Queen". On 4 November 1766, she was officially welcomed to the capital of Stockholm, where she was married to Gustav in person in the Royal Chapel at Stockholm Royal Palace.

=== Tenure as Crown Princess ===
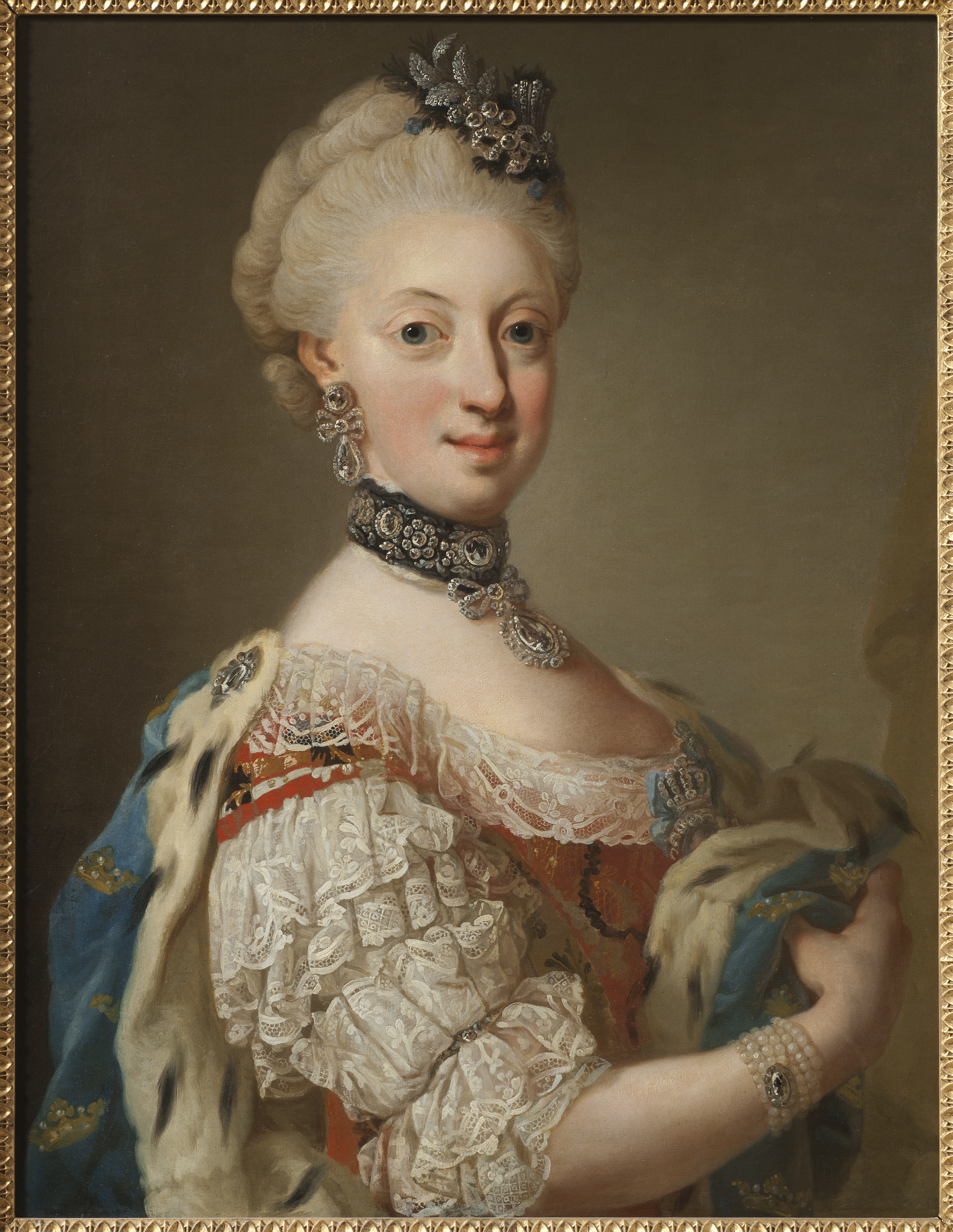
Portrait of Sophia Magdalena as Crown Princess, by Lorens Pasch the Younger, 1768.

Sophia Magdalena initially made a good impression upon the Swedish nobility with her beauty, elegance and skillful dance; but her shy, silent, and reserved nature soon made her a disappointment in the society life. Being of a reserved nature, she was considered cold and arrogant. Her mother-in-law Queen Louisa Ulrika, who once stated that she could comprehend nothing more humiliating than the position of a Queen Dowager, harassed her in many ways: a typical example was when she invited Gustav to her birthday celebrations, but asked him to make Sophia Magdalena excuse herself by pretending to be too ill to attend. Louisa Ulrika encouraged a distance between the couple in various ways, and Gustav largely ignored her so as not to make his mother jealous.

Sophia Magdalena was known to be popular with the Caps, who were supported by Denmark, while Louisa Ulrika and Gustav sided with the Hats. The Caps regarded Sophia Magdalena to be a symbol of virtue and religion in a degenerated royal court, and officially demonstrated their support. Sophia Magdalena was advised by the Danish ambassador not to involve herself in politics, and when the spies of Louisa Ulrika reported that Sophia Magdalena received letters from the Danish ambassador through her Danish entourage, the Queen regarded her to be a sympathizer of the Danish-supported Caps: she was isolated from any contact with the Danish embassy, and the Queen encouraged Gustav to force her to send her Danish servants home. This she did not do until 1770, and his demand contributed to their tense and distant relationship. In 1768, Charlotta Sparre tried to reconcile the couple at their summer residence Ekolsund Castle, but the marriage remained unconsummated.

== Early tenure as Queen ==
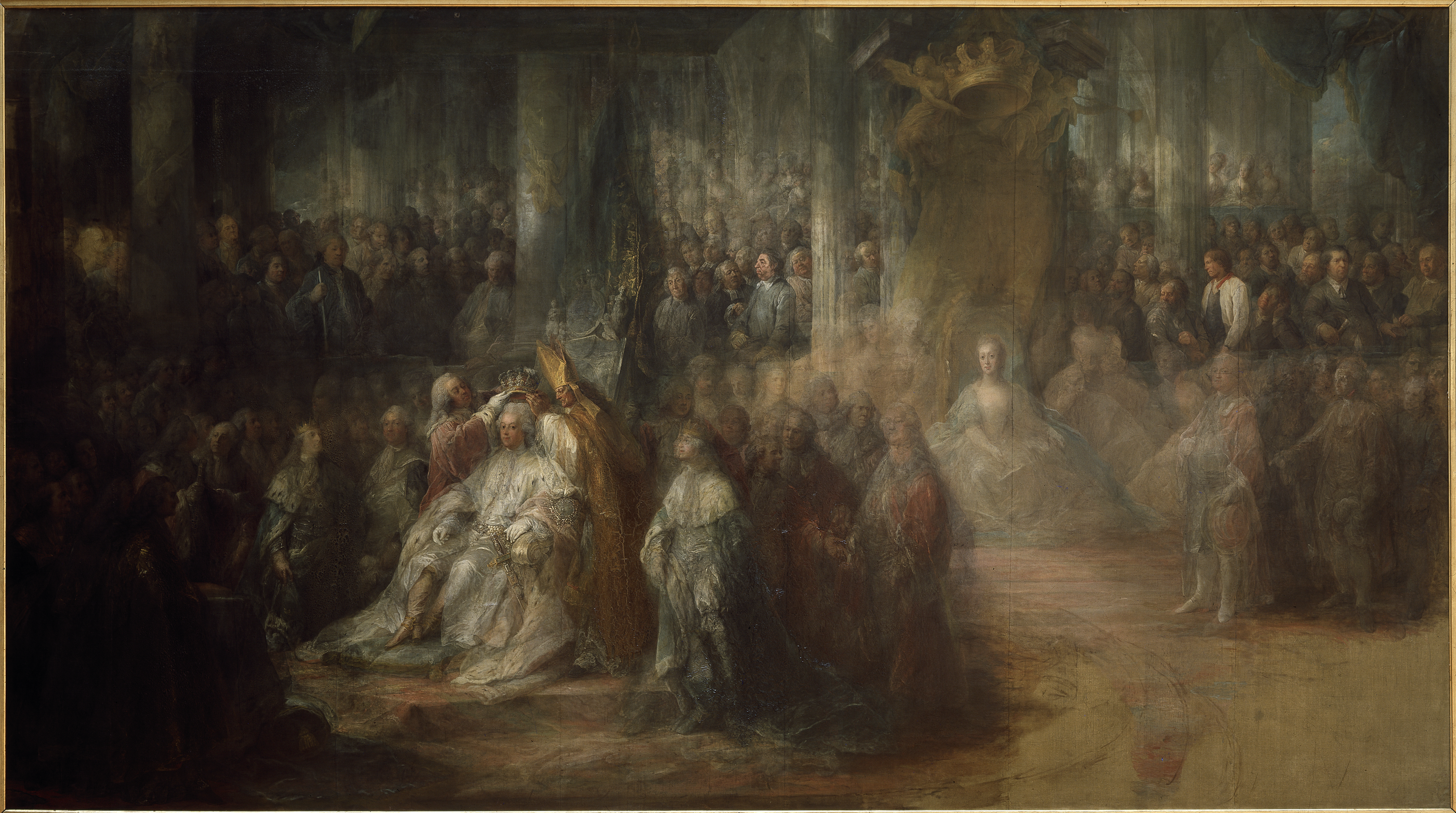
The coronation of Gustav III. Uncompleted painting by Carl Gustav Pilo, 1782–1793 (Nationalmuseum).

King Adolf Frederick died on 12 February 1771. Sophia Magdalena's husband ascended the throne as King Gustav III, while Sophia Magdalena herself became Queen of Sweden at the age of 24. The coronation of Gustav III and Sophia Magdalena took place the following year, on 29 May, in the Stockholm Cathedral.

The new queen was not informed about the coup of Gustav III, which reinstated absolute monarchy and ended the parliamentary rule of the Estates in the revolution of 1772. At the time she was deemed as suspicious and politically untrustworthy in the eyes of the King, primarily by her mother-in-law, who painted her as pro-Danish. Denmark was presumed to oppose the coup; there were also plans to conquer Norway from Denmark.

Sophia Magdalena was informed about politics nonetheless: she expressed herself pleased with the 1772 parliament because Count Fredrik Ribbing, for whom she had taken an interest, had regained his seat. The conflict between her and her mother-in-law was publicly known and disliked, and the sympathies were on her side. In the contemporary paper Dagligt Allehanda, a fable was presented about Rävinnan och Turturduvan ("The She Fox and the Turtle Dove"). The fable was about the innocent turtle dove (Sophia Magdalena) who was slandered by the wicked she fox (Louisa Ulrika), who was supported by the second she fox (Anna Maria Hjärne) and the other foxes (the nobility). The fable was believed to have been sent from the Caps party.

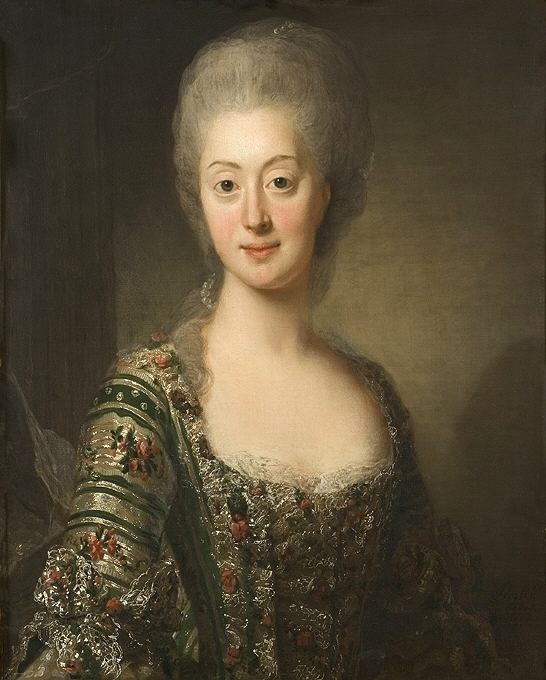
Portrait of Queen Sophia Magdalena by Alexander Roslin, c. 1774

Queen Sophia Magdalena was of a shy and reserved character, and was never a member of the King's inner circle. At the famous amateur court theater of Gustav III, Sophia Magdalena is occasionally named as participator in the documents. In 1777, for example, she dressed as an Italian sailor and participated in a battle between Italian and Spanish sailors. Usually it was rather her role to act as the passive lady of games and tournaments, and to decorate the winner with the award. She did her ceremonial duties, but disliked the vivid lifestyle of the court around her outgoing spouse.

As queen, she was expected to do a great deal of representation – more than what had been expected from previous queens due to her husband's adoration of representation. On formal occasions, she was at her best: she performed beautifully according to royal court etiquette, and was seen as dignified and impressive. For instance, on 17 September 1784, she cut the cord to let off the first air balloons from the Stockholm observatory. During the King's Italian journey in 1783–84, she hosted a grand formal public dinner every two weeks. During that time, she appeared at the Royal Swedish Opera and at the French Theater, but otherwise preferred her solitude. This attracted attention as during the absence of the King she had been expected to represent the royal couple all the more.

Sophia appeared to have enjoyed nature trips in the country side with only one lady-in-waiting and two footmen, however, her country side visitations were stopped because it was deemed 'unsuitable'. Several of her ladies-in-waiting were well known Swedish women of the era, among them The Three Graces: Augusta von Fersen, Ulla von Höpken and Lovisa Meijerfelt, as well as Marianne Ehrenström and Charlotta Cedercreutz, who were known artists.

Sophia Magdalena was a popular Queen: on 22 July 1788, for example, during the absence of her spouse in Finland, several members of the Royal Dramatic Theater and the musical society Augustibröder, among them Bellman, took a spontaneous trip by boat from the capital to Ulriksdal Palace, where she was, and performed a poem by Bellman to her honor at the occasion of her name day. In the famous diary of her sister-in-law, Princess Hedwig Elizabeth Charlotte, Sophia Magdalena is described as beautiful, cold, silent and haughty, very polite and formal, reserved and unsociable. When she performed her duties as Queen, her sister-in-law, Hedwig Elizabeth Charlotte of Holstein-Gottorp, described her as "Forced to meet people".

Sophia Magdalena preferred to spend her days in solitude whenever she could. She had two very intimate friends, Maria Aurora Uggla and Baroness Virginia Charlotta Manderström, but otherwise rarely participated in any social life outside of what was absolutely necessary to perform her representational duties. She frequently visited the theater, and she also had a great interest for fashion. As a result of this, she was somewhat criticized for being too vain: even when she had no representational duties to dress up for and spend her days alone in her rooms, she is said to have changed costumes several times daily, and according her chamberlain Adolf Ludvig Hamilton, she never passed a mirror without studying herself in it. She was also interested in literature, and educated herself in various subjects: her library contained works about geography, genealogy and history. She educated herself in Swedish, English, German and Italian, and regularly read French magazines. According to Augusta von Fersen, Sophia Magdalena was quite educated, but she was not perceived as such because she rarely engaged in conversation.

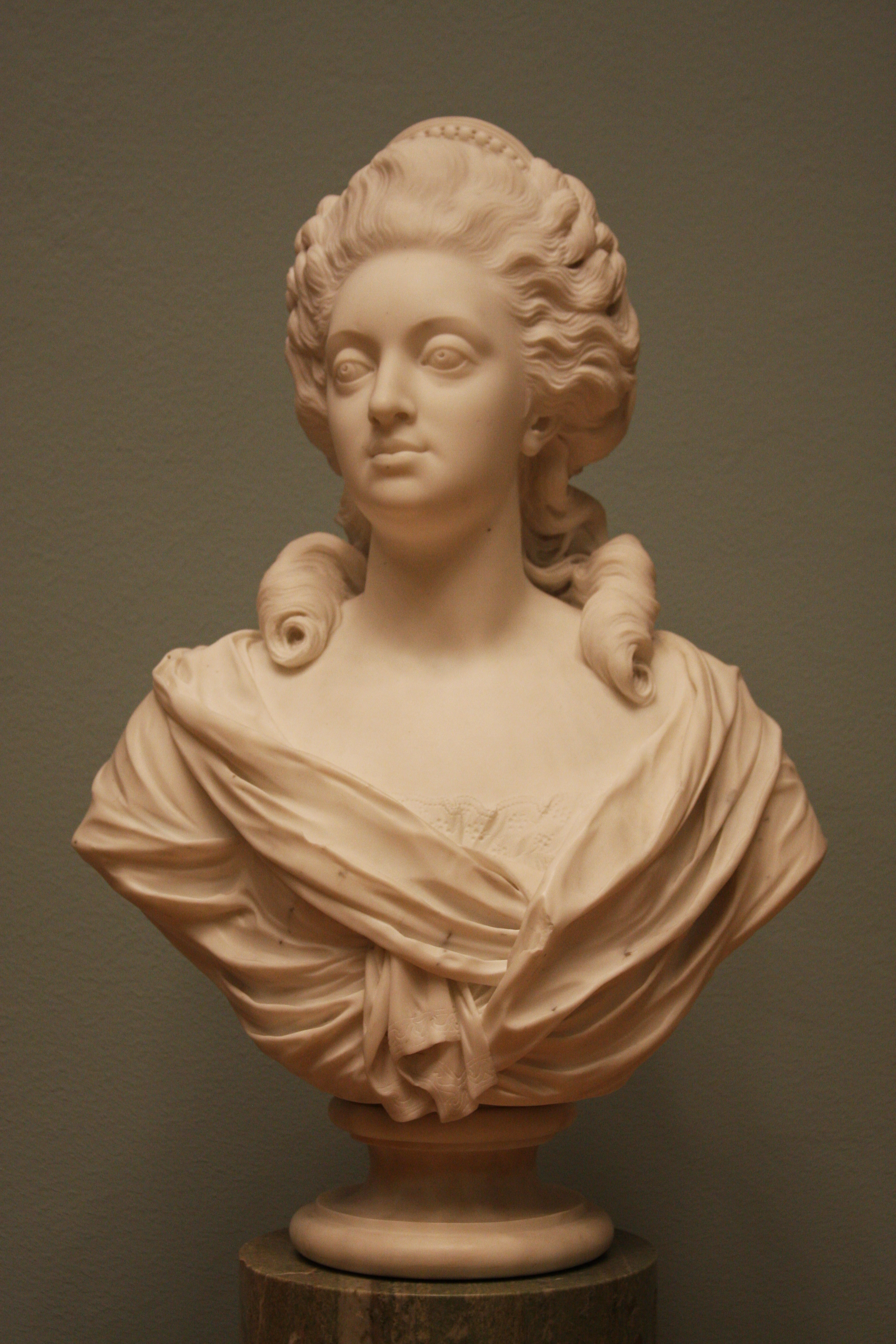
Bust of Sophia Magdalena by Johan Tobias Sergel, 1783.

In 1784, after the King had returned from his trip to Italy and France, the relationship between the King and Queen soured. At this time, Gustav III spent more and more time with male favorites. In 1786, this came to an open conflict. The King had taken to spend more time at intimate evenings with his favorite Gustaf Mauritz Armfelt, from which he excluded her company. When he gave some of her rooms at the Royal Palace to Armfelt, Sophia Magdalena refused to participate in any representation until the rooms were given back to her, and she also banned her ladies-in-waiting from accepting his invitations without her permission.

In 1787, she threatened him with asking for the support of the parliament against him if he took their son with him to Finland, which she opposed, and the year after, she successfully prevented him from doing so. She also reprimanded him from allowing his male favorites to slander her before him.

Queen Sophia Magdalena was never involved in politics, except for one on one occasion. In August 1788, during the Russo-Swedish War (1788–1790), the King gave her the task to enter in negotiations with Denmark to prevent a declaration of war from Denmark during the ongoing war against Russia. He asked her to call upon the Danish ambassador Reventlow and give him a letter to be read in the Danish royal council before her brother, the Danish King. He gave her the freedom to write as she wished, but to use the argument that she spoke as a sister and mother to a son with the right to the Danish throne and upon her own initiative.

Sophia Magdalena called upon the Danish ambassador, held a speech to him followed by a long conversation and then handed him a letter written as a "warm appeal" to her brother. A copy was sent to Gustav III, and her letter was read in the royal Danish council, where it reportedly made a good impression. However, her mission was still unsuccessful, as the Russo-Danish alliance made it unavoidable for Denmark to declare war shortly afterward. At the time, there was a note that she met two Russian prisoners of war in the park of the Haga Palace, and gave them 100 kronor each.

At the parliament of 1789 Gustav III united the other estates against the nobility and to gain support for the war and for his constitutional reform. Coming into conflict with the nobility, he had many of its representatives imprisoned. This act led to a social boycott of the monarch by the female members of the aristocracy, who followed the example of Jeanna von Lantingshausen as well as the King's sister and sister-in-law, Sophie Albertine of Sweden and Hedvig Elisabeth Charlotte. The Queen did not participate in this political demonstration and refused to allow any talk of politics in her presence. She was nevertheless involved in the conflict. When the King informed his son about the event, he discovered the child to be already informed in other ways than what he had intended. He suspected Sophia Magdalena to be responsible, and asked the governor of the prince, Count Nils Gyldenstolpe, to speak to her. Gyldenstolpe, however, sent one of the king's favorites, Baron Erik Boye. The Queen, who despised the favorites of the King, furiously told Boye that she spoke to her son how she wished and that only her contempt for him prevented her from having him thrown out of the window. She was known to dislike the reforms of 1789, and she did let it be known to its representatives. At the celebrations of the Victory at Fredrikshamn in 1790, she refused to be escorted by riksråd Count Joakim Beck-Friis, who was in favor of the reform, and demanded to be escorted by Count Axel von Fersen the Elder, who was in opposition to it.

In the autumn of 1790, the King chose to remain in the summer residence of Drottningholm Palace well in to the autumn because of the social boycott. Finally, the Queen returned to the capital without his consent. He accused her of having been manipulated by the female courtiers into participating in the political demonstration, and refusing him the company of her ladies-in-waiting by leaving. This applied especially to Hedvig Ulrika De la Gardie and Augusta von Fersen, who did not participate in the boycott: he suspected Hedvig Eleonora von Fersen to have persuaded the Queen to participate in the boycott. This is however is not considered to have been true: though the Queen did oppose to the act of 1789, she is reported never to have allowed any one to speak of politics in her presence. The reason to why she wished to leave was reportedly due to her health, as Drottningholm was quite cold by that time of the year and she had been afflicted by an ear infection. The King did in any case suspect her of being in political opposition to him, and before his trip to Aachen in 1791, he ordered that his son was to be separated from her during his absence abroad. When she was made aware of this, Sophia Magdalena caused a public scene when she visited him in his box at the opera and demanded to be given access to her son. This led to a heated argument and she left the box with the words: "I will have my vengeance, monsieur! I give you my sacred vow on that!"

== Succession issues ==
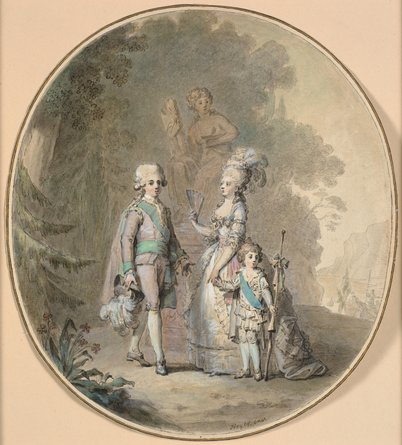
Cornelius Høyer: Gustav III, Queen Sophia Magdalena and Crown Prince Gustav Adolf in Hagaparken 1784–1785

Sophia Magdalena is mostly known in Swedish history for the scandal created around the consummation of her marriage and the questioned legitimacy of her son. Her marriage was a then normal arranged royal match for political convenience, in which Sophia Magdalena at first was described by her spouse as "cold as ice". Sophia Magdalena's religious upbringing and introverted character made her avoid the lively and spontaneous Gustavian court life, which made her even less attractive in the eyes of her outgoing spouse.

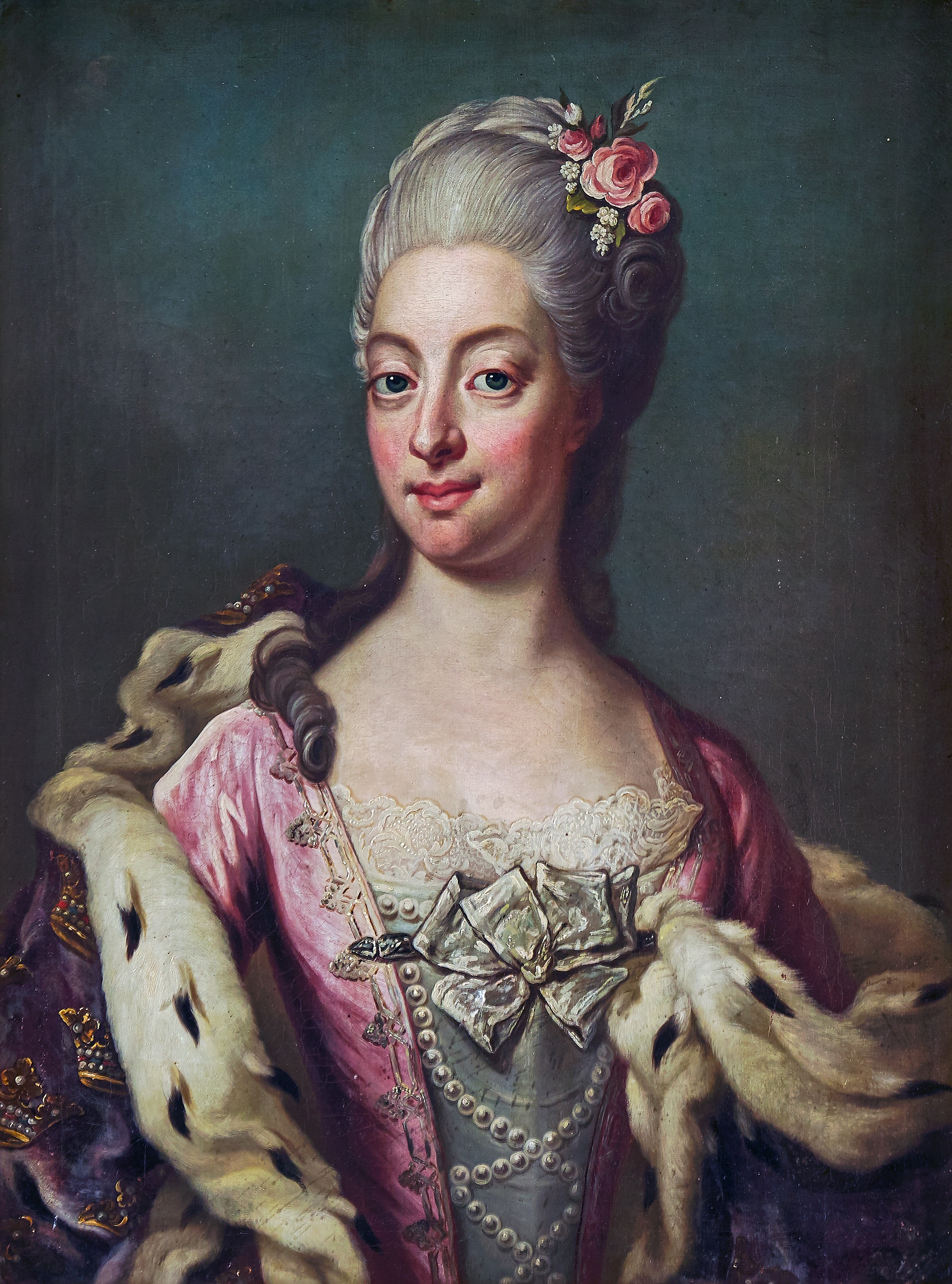
Portrait of Queen Sophia Magdalena by Jakob Björck, 1775.

Their marriage was not consummated until 1775, nine years after the wedding. The status quo between Gustav III and his consort was nurtured by the Queen Dowager, Louisa Ulrika, who did not want competition in her influence over her son. There were rumors that the King was a homosexual or sexually underdeveloped. His sexuality, which had much effect on Sophia Magdalena's life, as a royal marriage was designed to produce offspring, has been much debated. His sexual inexperience has been blamed on immaturity or him also being asexual.

As a teenager, Gustav had a crush on Axel von Fersen's mother, Hedvig Catharina De la Gardie, though this affection was never physical. In 1768, he had another infatuation with the noble Charlotte Du Rietz, but this is not believed to have been sexually consummated either. Various documents written during his lifetime alleged that he was bisexual or homosexual.

His sister-in-law, Princess Charlotte, claims that the King did participate in homosexual activity after his trip to Italy in 1784 and that there were several rumors about this: she claims that she herself had witnessed that the park at Drottningholm Palace had become a place where male courtiers searched for homosexual partners, and in a letter to Sophie von Fersen, she writes in code:

"It is said that the King recently attacked a young man in the park at night and offered him the post of chamberlain to the Queen if he agreed to his lusts, but the young man preferred to leave. Agree that this is to take things too far. It is said that the trips to Svartsjö Palace are made to be provide privacy, it is unbelievable, but it is what it is said. I could tell you a million things about this."

In 1791, Sophia Magdalena herself paid a surprise visit to the King during his stay at the Gustav III's Pavilion, where the King had spent more time since he came in conflict with the nobility after the 1789 parliament; and where he was reputed to indulge in orgies. She found the King in bed, and he asked one of his favorites, Count Fabian Wrede, to show her around. In the King's private chamber, however, the Queen found the actor and page of the King, Lars Hjortsberg, sleeping, naked. The Queen reacted by interrupting the tour by saying to Wrede that he apparently did not know his way around Haga, as he had obviously showed her the chamber of the staff rather than the King by mistake.

Some sources explain that both the Queen and the King had serious anatomical problems resulting in erotic complications. Erik Lönnroth has concluded that there is no factual proof for the rumors that Gustav III was inclined toward homosexuality or bisexuality, nor that Gustav Adolf was illegitimate.

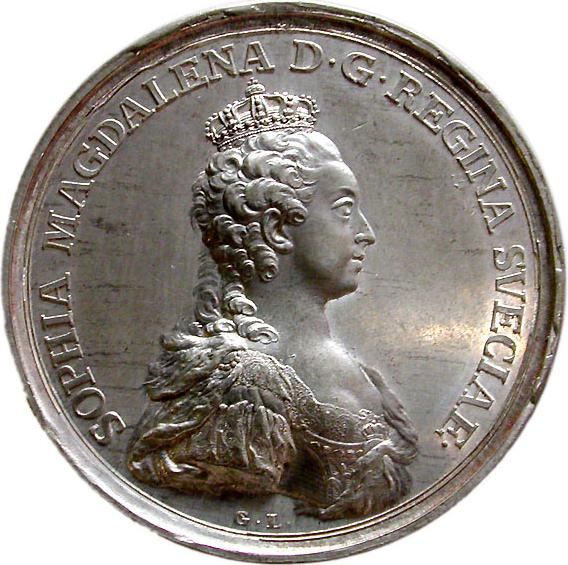
Sophia Magdalene in her crown on a special coin

During the Coup of Gustav III on 19 August 1772, Sophia Magdalena was at Ekolsund Castle. After having been told of the successful coup where her consort had reinstated absolute monarchy, she confided to her Mistress of the Robes, Countess Anna Maria Hjärne, that she was afraid that she would now be divorced by Gustav, because she knew she was not liked by him, because she had not given birth, and because she knew she was being slandered before him. Gustav III was told of this and her words led to a conflict. At a following ball at Ekolsund, the King told Count Axel von Fersen the Elder, that he did plan to divorce her on the grounds of pro-Danish plots and adultery with riksråd Count Fredrik Sparre and Marcus Gerhard Rosencrone of the Danish legation in Stockholm. Von Fersen, however, convinced him not to by saying that she should not be regarded to participate in pro-Danish plots just for her love of her Danish chamber-maids, and that as a neglected wife, she should not be blamed for enjoying the compliments of Count Ribbing, which were not grounds for suspicions of adultery. During this period, it had been noted that Count Ribbing was often seen in the company of the Queen and had paid her compliments and made her laugh, among other things by caricaturing her Mistress of the Robes Countess Anna Maria Hjärne. Countess Hjärne had informed the King that the Queen was pregnant, "And the riksråd Ribbing is her favorite."

The King had given Countess Ulrica Catharina Stromberg the task to investigate this, and she was told by the chamber madame of Sophia Magdalena, Charlotta Hellman, that: "information, which were dubious, especially since the clearest evidence could be gathered from the linen of the Queen". Her contact with Rosencrone is said to have been restricted to the fact that he handled her correspondence with Denmark. After the reconciliation of Sophia Magdalena and Gustav III, he apologized to her for having believed these rumors.

In 1774, the King arranged the marriage between his brother, the future Charles XIII of Sweden, and Hedwig Elizabeth Charlotte of Holstein-Gottorp, to solve, for the time being, the immediate question of an heir to the throne. The Duchess had false pregnancies and miscarriages only, which may have hastened the King to expedite the consummation of his own marriage and produce a son of his own.

In 1778, Sophia Magdalena gave birth to Gustav Adolf, successor to the throne, and in 1782, she gave birth to a second son, Charles Gustav, who only lived for one year. It was suggested in some circles that King Gustav's first son was sired by someone else. When the heir was born, the father was believed, by the Queen Dowager among others, to be Count Adolf Fredrik Munck af Fulkila, then Riksstallmästare. This rumor was believed by elements of the public and the royal court, and her acquiescence to it led to a year-long break between the Queen Dowager and her son.

=== Succession scandal ===
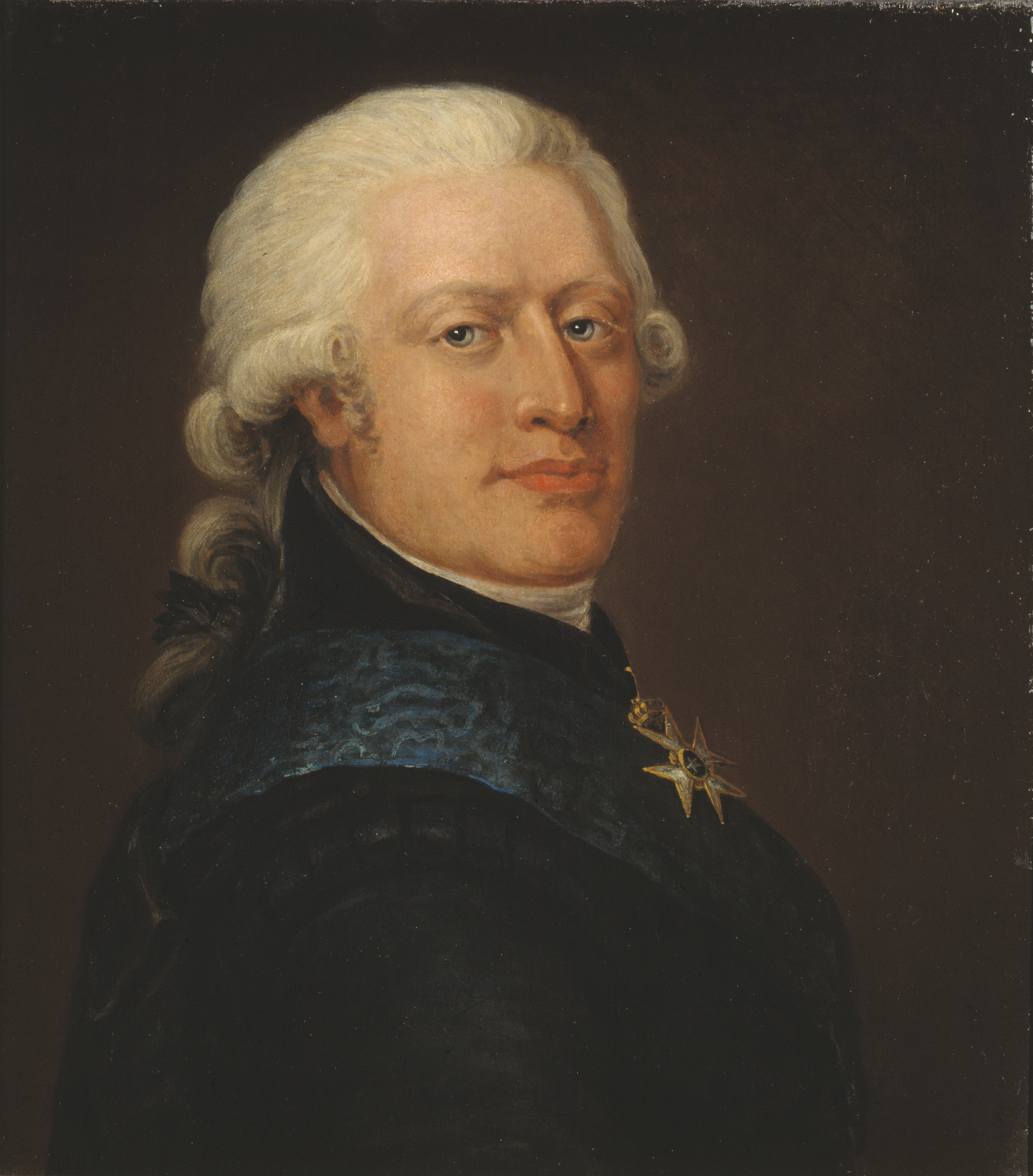
Munck as painted by Jonas Forsslund in 1799

The King, claiming to be sexually inexperienced, called upon Munck to help him with a reconciliation with his spouse, instruct the couple in the ways of sexual intercourse, and physically show them how to consummate their marriage. Munck, a Finnish nobleman and, at the time, a stable master was, at that point, the lover of Anna Sofia Ramström, the Queen's chamber maid. Through Anna Sofia Ramström, Munck contacted Ingrid Maria Wenner, who was assigned to inform the queen of the king's wish, because she was married and the confidant of the queen. Munck and Ramström were to be present in a room close to the bedchamber, ready to be of assistance when needed, and he was, at some points, called into the bedchamber. Munck himself writes in his written account, which is preserved at the National Archives of Sweden, that to succeed, he was obliged to touch them both physically.

When it became known that Munck participated in the reconciliation between the royal couple, there were rumours that he was the father of Sophia Magdalena's firstborn.

These became the subject of accusations from the political opposition, as late as in 1786 and 1789, where it was claimed that the whole nation was aware of the rumour that the King had asked Munck to make the Queen pregnant. Pamphlets to that end were posted on street corners all over Stockholm.

This was also caricatured by Carl August Ehrensvärd in private letters discovered later – his drawing was published in 1987 —, where he passed on a number of rumors and jokes about Gustav III, Sophia Magdalena and Munck without inferring that he believed they were true. There was also a rumour that the King and Queen had divorced in secret and that the Queen had married Munck.

There is no proof that Munck was the father of the crown prince. Erik Lönnroth has suggested that the anatomical problems mentioned in Munck's account, known only to a few initiated persons, were the primary factor in their delay in producing an heir. At the time, the rumors became more persistent, however, when the royal couple presented Munck with gifts: the King promoted him, and the Queen gave Munck a pension, a diamond ring, and a watch with her image.

A few socialites took the Queen Mother's side in supporting and spreading the rumors, such as Anna Charlotta Schröderheim and Eva Helena Löwen.

The circle around the King's brother, Duke Charles, the future Charles XIII of Sweden, who desired the throne, also encouraged these rumors. Their mother was quoted as saying, during the pregnancy of Sophia Magdalena, that there were rumors among the public that the future child was illegitimate, and that she herself believed that the King had hired Munck to impregnate the Queen, and that she would never accept that the throne would come into the hands of "a common nobleman's illegitimate offspring".

The Queen Mother ordered Duke Charles to interrogate Munck, and word spread to the King, who was shocked. Sophia Magdalena was equally shocked by the accusations. She swore she would never speak to the Queen Dowager again, and indeed she never did.

The King arranged for his mother to make a public apology for her accusation in the presence of the rest of the Royal Family the 12 May 1778. The scene gained a lot of attention and broke the bonds between Gustav III and his mother. The scandal disturbed celebrations, as did an accident with the public banquet. The public was invited to a great feast to celebrate the birth of the heir, but too many people were let in, and the crowd panicked. Between sixty and one hundred people were trampled to death in the crowd.

Sven Anders Hedin, a medical doctor at the royal court, and married to one of the Queen's chambermaids, Charlotta Hellman, contributed two statements which have been quoted in connection with the scandal. In the summer of 1780, during the King's absence abroad, he passed through the private apartments of the Queen, which were expected to be empty at that hour. There, he claimed to have seen the Queen and Baron Munck embracing each other through the not-quite closed door to her bedroom. To warn them that they were not alone, he hummed a tune and pretended to speak to himself, saying that he would be in trouble if the Queen discovered him there, and then left the room. He claimed to have found three expensive court costumes in his room a few days after this event. In October 1781, Hedin met the King in the corridor on his way to the Queen's bedchamber. Gustav III asked Hedin what time it was, and Hedin claims to have added to his reply: "In nine months, I will be able to answer exactly!" in which Hedin insinuated that the King had expected him to remember the time should the fatherhood of the next child be questioned.

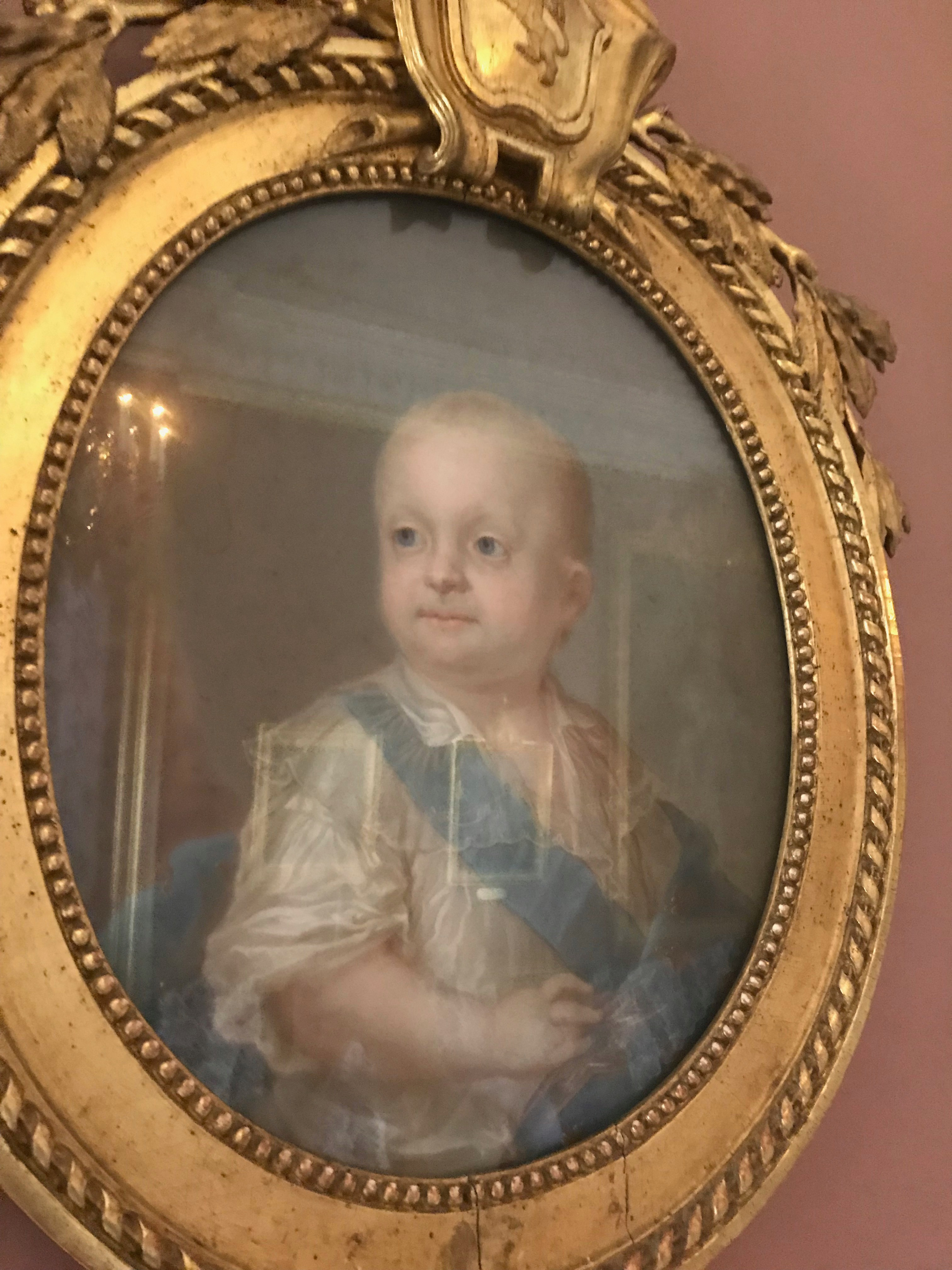
Prince Carl Gustav (1782–1783), Duke of Småland, second son of Sophia Magdalena and Gustav III.

In 1782, Sophia Magdalena had a second son, Prince Carl Gustav, Duke of Småland. After the death of her younger son in 1783, her marriage deteriorated. In May 1784, Sophia Magdalena is believed to have had a miscarriage, and after this, there are no further notes of any pregnancies. A brief reconciliation in 1787 was deemed by Duchess Hedwig Elizabeth Charlotte in her diaries as temporary, with no hope of being complete and lasting, as the King was not "receptive to female charm": another insinuation that he was homosexual.

In 1787, Sophia Magdalena deposited a sum of 50.000 riksdaler in an account for Munck, which was generally rumoured to be a "farewell gift". At this point, Munck had started an affair with the ballerina Giovanna Bassi, to whom Sophia Magdalena showed great dislike. The King was terrified when he heard that the Queen had made that deposit, and he tried to prevent the transaction from becoming public knowledge, which, however, did not succeed. Munck was, however, continued to be used as a go-between and a messenger between the King and the Queen, especially during conflicts.

A child of Giovanna Bassi's, rumored to be the child of Munck, bore a strong likeness to the Crown Prince.

== Queen Dowager ==
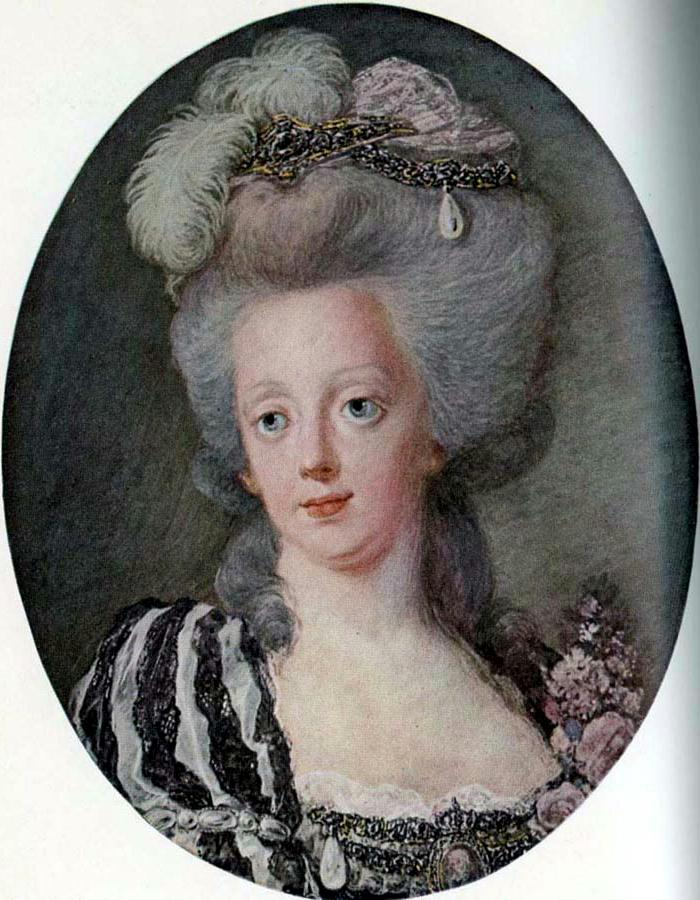
Portrait of Sophia Magdalena by Niclas Lafrensen the younger, 1792

On 16 March 1792 Gustav III was attacked and mortally wounded. Sophia Magdalena was reportedly shocked and horrified by the attack. The conspirators intended to make her the regent of her son during his minority. As a Guardian government had been necessary by putting a minor monarch on the throne, their plan was to offer this role to Sophia Magdalena by taking military control and offering the Queen dowager the role of presiding over the guardian council instead of her brother-in-law Duke Charles. Directly after she was told of the attack, Sophia Magdalena sent for the king's favorite, Gustav Mauritz Armfelt, and was taken by him to the sick bed of the King. There, she took the hands of the King between hers and cried out to Armfelt: "How horrifying! Such a cruel atrocity!" She was kept informed of his state by Armfelt, but she was prevented from further visits because Gustav did not wish to receive visits from women because of the smell from his wounds. At the death of Gustav III 29 March 1792, she attempted to visit him, but she was blocked by her brother-in-law Duke Charles, who fell on his knees before her to stop her from entering the bed room.

Sophia Magdalena caused a scandal as it was noted that she did not dress in mourning except when she was forced to do so at visits and on formal occasions. This criticism was likely worsened because she was exposed to some suspicions, as it was known that the conspirators had planned to make her regent.

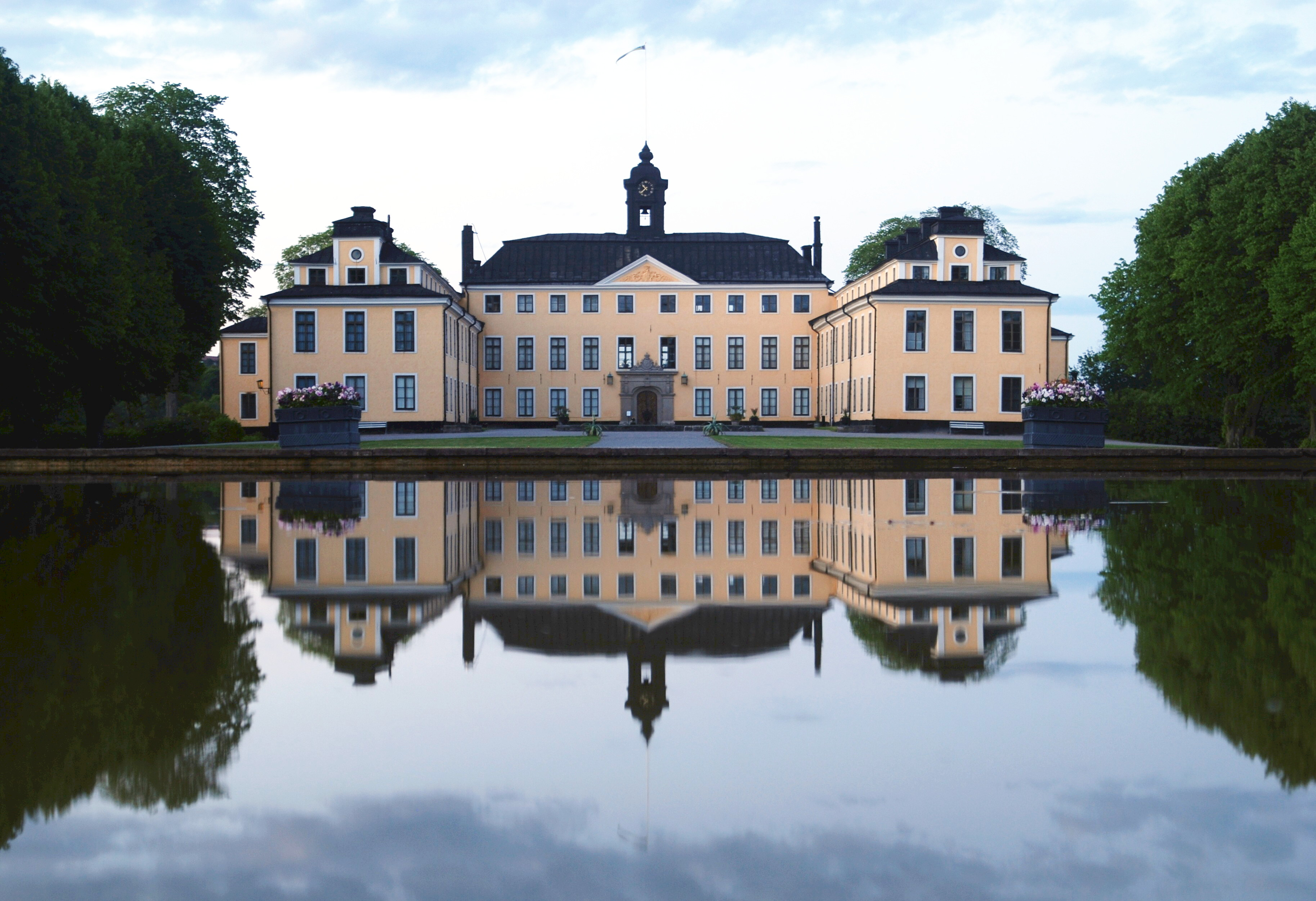
Ulriksdal Palace, photographed in 2009.

As Queen Dowager, it was a relief to Sophia Magdalena to withdraw from public life. Her brother-in-law, Duke Charles, became regent, and she eschewed a political role. As a widow, Sophia Magdalena lived a withdrawn life. She did not wish to take part in any representational duties, and she gave up her quarters at Drottningholm Palace to be relieved of them. She lived in the Royal Palace in Stockholm during the winter, and at Ulriksdal Palace during the summer. She lived in a circle of her own court, and seldom entertained any guests other than her lifelong friends Maria Aurora Uggla and Virginia Manderström. It is noted that, although she had hated the male favorites of her spouse during his lifetime, she gave several of them positions in her court as a widow. Sophia Magdalena had a close relationship with her son, King Gustav IV Adolf, who visited her regularly and with whom she shared an interest in religion.

In 1797, she insisted on skipping the protocol at the reception of her daughter-in-law, Frederica of Baden. The etiquette demanded that as Queen Dowager, she should not greet her daughter-in-law at the stair of the royal palace with the rest of the royal family, but wait for her in her own salon, but she refused: "I know myself how I suffered, when I arrived to Sweden, and how painfully I reacted to the cold reception I was given by Queen Louisa Ulrika. As for my daughter-in-law, I have decided to spare her from having to experience such bitter emotions!" During the reign of her son, she seldom showed herself at court except on Sundays and at court presentations, and preferred to stay at her estate. She regularly met her son and his family on family visits, but she did not participate in court life.

In 1809 she witnessed the coup and following abdication of her son, King Gustav IV Adolf of Sweden, after Sweden lost Finland to Russia. She was deeply affected by his deposition. On the day of the coup, she was informed by her friend Maria Aurora Uggla, and in her company she immediately rushed to the quarters of her son. She was prevented from seeing him by guards, and burst into tears in the arms of Uggla. Shortly after, she was visited in her quarters by Duke Charles in the company of guards, who officially told her what had happened and made her burst into tears again by officially banning her from seeing her son. When she, during the captivity of her son, formally applied for permission to see him, and was told by Charles that she could not unless given permission by the government, she publicly commented: "The government was not asked for permission for the murder of my husband, neither any permission was sought to depose and imprison my son, but I must have their permission, to speak to my child." She was never to see her son again, but she corresponded with him for the rest of her life. He was sent into exile and replaced by his paternal uncle Charles XIII, but she remained in Sweden until her death. She did, however, say goodbye to her daughter-in-law and her grandchildren when they left Stockholm to join Gustav Adolf.

In January 1810, she was presented to the elected heir to the throne, Charles August, Crown Prince of Sweden. During his visit, he stopped before the portrait of her grandson Gustav, and informed her that he wished to adopt him for his successor. Later that year (2 November 1810), she was presented to the next elected heir to the throne, Jean Baptiste Bernadotte. He regarded her with suspicion and believed that she did not wish to see him, but she commented: "I am grateful for the sensitivity of the Crown prince, but he is mistaken, if he believes that I do not wish to see him! It would be unfair if I were to hold the least bit of dislike toward him, for it is not he who has deposed my son!" At the meeting, her face was said to have turned white, but at the end, she is said to have been delighted by his charm. In 1811, she was one of the few in the Swedish Court who were nice to Désirée Clary.

In September 1812, Germaine de Staël was presented to her, and gave her the impression of her: "Her Majesty analyzed my books as an educated woman, whose judgement showed as much thoroughness as well as delicate feeling. Never has any one impressed me such as your Queen! I almost dared not reply to her, so taken was I by the royal glory around her – it gave me such respect, that I shivered!" When the Crown Prince banned any contact between Swedes and the former royal family, Germaine de Staël asked that an exception was to be made for Sophia Magdalena, and it was: her letters were however read by foreign minister Lars von Engeström.

=== Later life and death ===
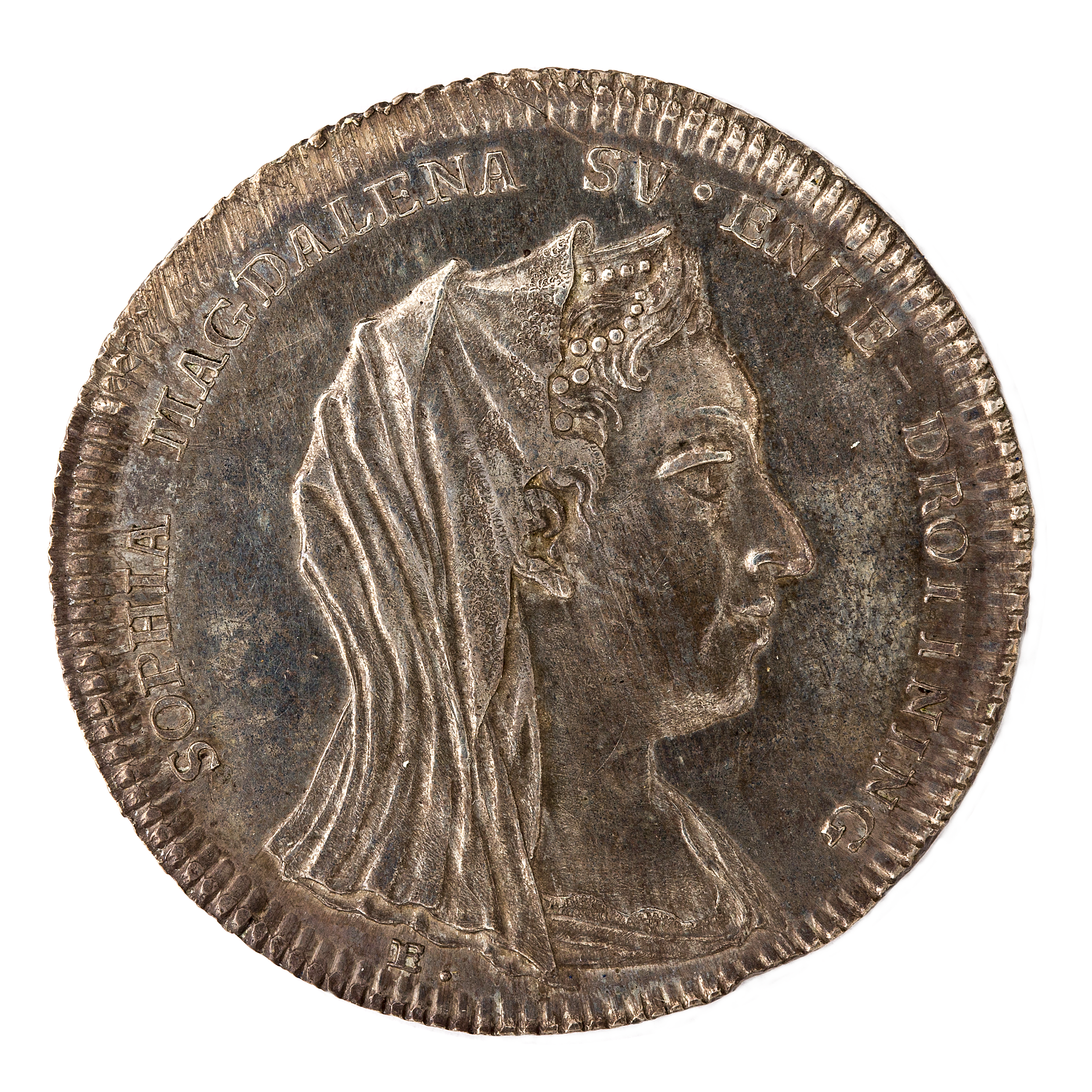
Coin minted for Sophia Magdalena's funeral in 1813.

Sophia Magdalena lived more isolated towards the end of her life and was affected for a long time by an eye disease and worsened health. From 1812, she devoted much of her time to her friendship with the young amateur botanic Baron Anton Fredrik Wrangel.

She never fully recovered after having suffered a stroke in May 1813. After a widowhood of more than 21 years, she died aged 67 on 21 August 1813 at Ulriksdal Palace. She was interred next to her husband in The Gustavian Crypt of Riddarholmen Church on the islet of Riddarholmen in central Stockholm, the traditional burial site for Swedish monarchs.

== In popular culture ==
Royal Monogram of Queen Sophia Magdalena of Sweden

The affair of the consummation of her marriage and the succession scandal was portrayed in SVT's period drama television series in two parts The Marriage of Gustav III (Swedish: Gustav III:s äktenskap) which aired in 2001. The director was Marcus Olsson, the manuscript writer was Klas Östergren, and Sophia Magdalena was portrayed by the Danish actress Iben Hjejle.

It was also used to inspire the classic Swedish novel The Queen's Tiara (Swedish: Drottningens juvelsmycke, lit. 'The Queen's Jewels') by Carl Jonas Love Almquist, published in 1834. The novel features one of Swedish literature's most enduringly popular characters, the intersex Tintomara who is portrayed as a half sibling of Gustav IV Adolf through Count Munck.

== Family ==
=== Issue ===
Name	Portrait	Lifespan	Notes
Gustav Adolf; King of Sweden		1 November 1778 – 7 February 1837	Married Frederica of Baden in 1797. Divorced in 1812. Had issue.
Carl Gustav; Duke of Småland		25 August 1782 – 23 March 1783	Died in infancy.

=== Ancestry ===
Ancestors of Sophia Magdalena of Denmark

8. Frederick IV of Denmark
4. Christian VI of Denmark
9. Louise of Mecklenburg-Güstrow
2. Frederick V of Denmark
10. Christian Heinrich, Margrave of Brandenburg-Kulmbach
5. Sophie Magdalene of Kulmbach
11. Sophie Christiane of Wolfstein
1. Sophia Magdalena of Denmark
12. George I of Great Britain
6. George II of Great Britain
13. Sophia Dorothea of Celle
3. Louise of Great Britain
14. John Frederick, Margrave of Brandenburg-Ansbach
7. Caroline of Ansbach
15. Eleonore Erdmuthe of Saxe-Eisenach

Sophia Magdalena of Denmark House of Oldenburg Born: 3 July 1746 Died: 21 August 1813
Swedish royalty
Preceded by Louisa Ulrika of Prussia	Queen consort of Sweden; 1771–1792	Vacant Title next held by Frederica of Baden
