= Prince Carl Gustav, Duke of Småland =

Swedish prince (1782–1783)

Prince Carl Gustav
- Duke of Småland
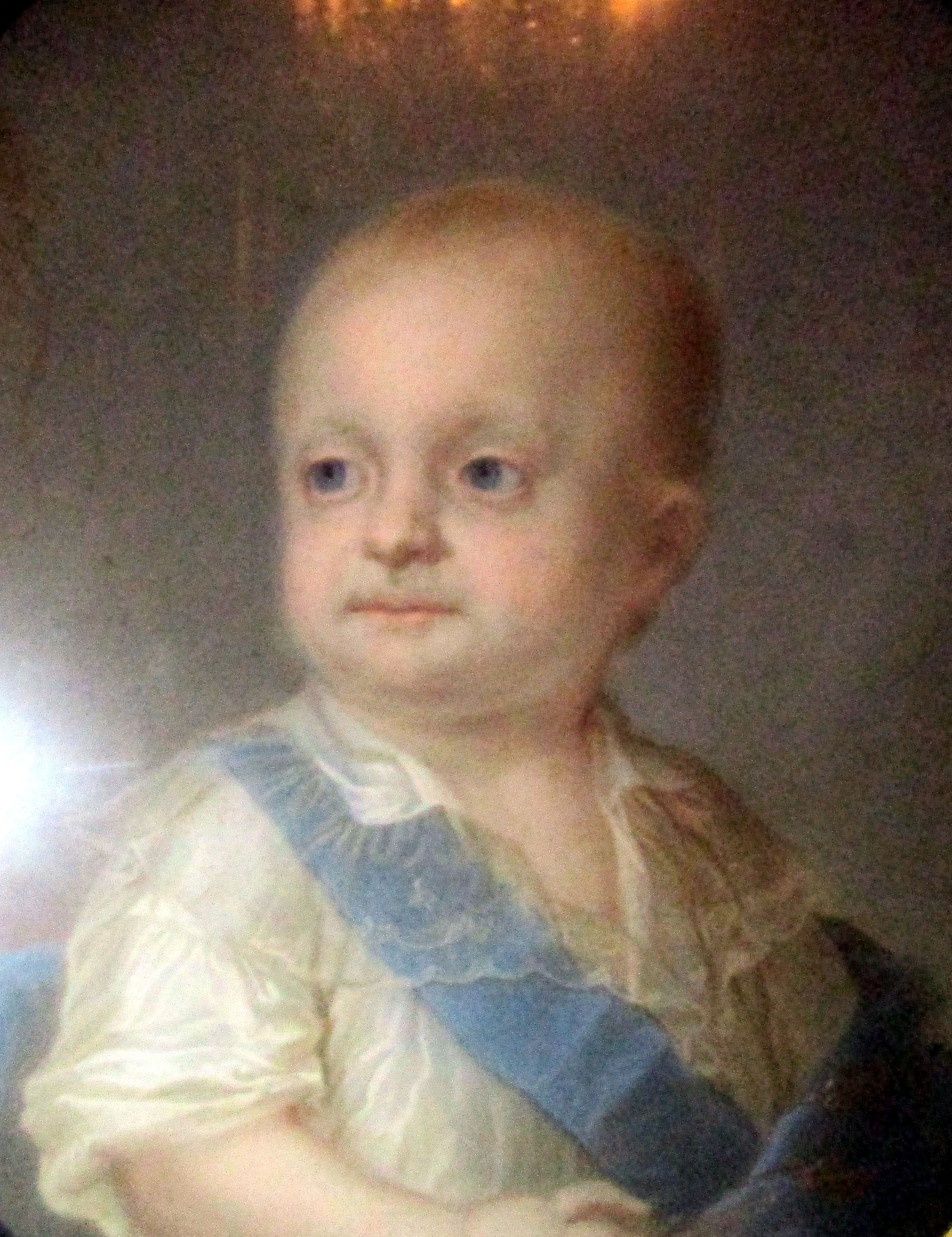
- Carl Gustav as painted by Gustaf Lundberg
- Born: 25 August 1782; Drottningholm Palace, Drottningholm, Sweden
- Died: 23 March 1783 (aged 0); Stockholm Palace, Stockholm, Sweden
- House: Holstein-Gottorp
- Father: King Gustav III
- Mother: Sophia Magdalena of Denmark

Prince Carl Gustav, Duke of Småland (25 August 1782 – 23 March 1783) was a prince of Sweden, being the son of King Gustav III of Sweden and Queen Sophia Magdalena. He died in infancy.

== Early life ==
Born at Drottningholm, Gustav was the second son in the marriage of King Gustav III of Sweden and Queen Sophia Magdalena. He had one elder sibling, Gustav Adolph, who would become King of Sweden. The baby was described as strong, healthy and big; Carl Gustav's father was especially fond of him.

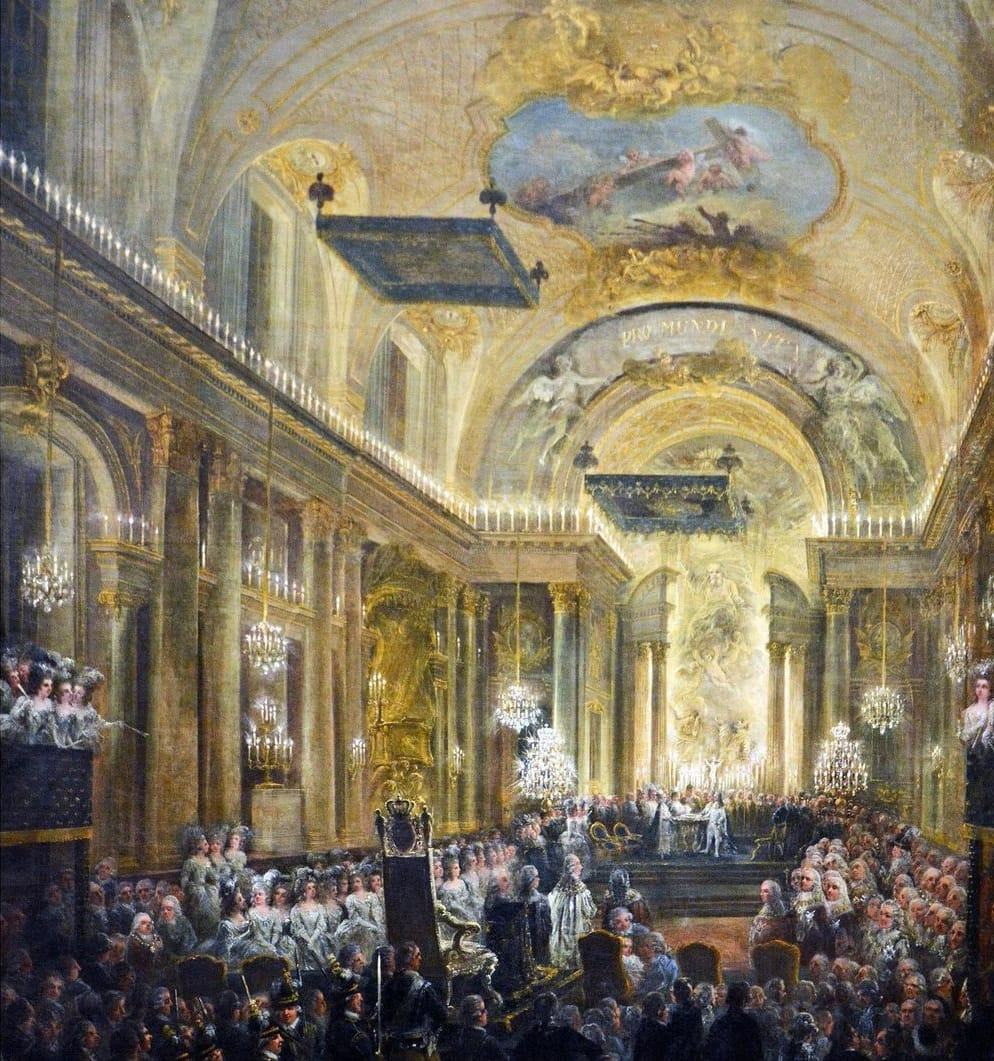
Baptism Of Prince Carl Gustaf, Duke of Småland, 1782, Elias Martin.

== Death ==
In March 1783 the young Prince suddenly took ill, probably from inappropriate food and died when he was little over a half year old. He was interred in Riddarholm Church in Stockholm.

His father took the death very hard and had never been seen so grief stricken, unable even to attend the little boy's funeral. After Carl Gustav's death Gustav III began new phases in his own life, travelling far away from Sweden, gradually increasing his power and starting war. Several writers have attributed the change in his personality and activity at least in part to his strong reaction at the death of his second son.

== Arms ==
Coat of arms of Prince Carl Gustav, Duke of Småland
