= Hans Wigren =

Swedish actor

- Born: 26 October 1940 (age 85); Umeå, Sweden
- Occupation: Actor
- Years active: 1962-present

Hans Wigren (born 26 October 1940) is a Swedish actor. He has appeared in more than 25 films and television shows since 1962.

== Selected filmography ==
- Dear John (1964)
- Sally and Freedom (1981)
- Underground Secrets (1991)
- The Marriage of Gustav III (2001)
