= Stefan Gödicke =

Swedish actor (born 1970)

- Born: 20 January 1970 (age 56)
- Occupation: Actor
- Years active: 1997-present

Stefan Gödicke (born 20 January 1970) is a Swedish actor. He appeared in more than twenty films since 1997.

== Selected filmography ==
Film
Year	Title	Role	Notes
2012	Simon and the Oaks		
2016	A Man Called Ove		

TV
Year	Title	Role	Notes
2001	The Marriage of Gustav III	Duke Charles	
2007-2010	Andra Avenyn	Tony Dahlberg	
2014–2015, 2018, 2022	Morden i Sandhamn	Jonas Sköld	
2021	Det som göms i snö	Conny Berg	
