= Anna Sparre =

Swedish kitesurfer

Anna Sparre (born 1980) is a Swedish kitesurfer. She was, together with Christian Dittrich, the first Swede to enter the world cup (PKRA) in 2003.

She competed in two kitesurfing world cups, PKRA and KPWT, during the years 2003 to 2005, with a third place in a KPWT freestyle competition.

Anna Sparre won the titles Nordic kitesurfing champion and Swedish kitesurfing champion. She is known for being one of the first female riders learning progressive tricks such as handlepass and flat 360 as well as for her waveriding.

Anna Sparre is mainly known for her podcast 4Health med Anna Sparre, which was the first Swedish health podcast.
