= Gjörwell =

Gjörwell is a surname. Notable people with the surname include:

- Carl Christoffer Gjörwell (1766–1837), Swedish architect
- Carl Christoffer Gjörwell Sr. (1731–1811), Swedish journalist, journal editor, and psalmist
