= Anna Sofia Ramström =

Swedish courtier (1738–1786)

Anna Sofia Ramström (1738–1786) was a kammarfru of the Queen of Sweden, Sophie Magdalena of Denmark. She was known for her involvement in the famous affair of the consummation of the marriage between the royal couple.

== History ==
Anna Sofia Ramström was one of the kammarfru of queen Sophia Magdalena: the position of kammarfru was roughly equivalent to that of a Lady's maid, and was normally recruited from the wealthy burgher class: her brother-in-law, Erik Ek, was a merchant.

In 1775, King Gustav III of Sweden made the decision to consummate his marriage. Through Anna Sofia Ramström, Count Adolf Fredrik Munck af Fulkila contacted Ingrid Maria Wenner, who was assigned to inform the queen of the king's wish, because she was married and the confidant of the queen. In the negotiations, Ramström took the role of the Queen’s confidante and messenger, while Count Adolf Fredrik Munck af Fulkila played the same part for the King. Initially, Maria Aurora Uggla had been considered for the task, but Munck and Ramström was decided upon as they were lovers at the time.

The King, claiming to be sexually inexperienced, called upon Munck to help him with a reconciliation with his spouse and instruct the couple in the ways of sexual intercourse and to physically show them how to consummate their marriage. The fact that Munck, a Finnish nobleman and at the time a stable master, was the lover of Ramström was one of the reasons to why he was chosen Munck and Ramström were to be present in a room close to the bedchamber, ready to be of assistance when needed, and he was at some points called into the bedchamber. Munck himself writes in his written account, which is preserved at the National Archives of Sweden, that in order to succeed, he was obliged to touch them both physically.

This "aid" resulted in the birth of the future King Gustaf IV Adolf in 1778. These favors resulted in a great scandal when they became known. Munck was widely spoken of as the lover of the king and the queen. When it became known that Munck participated in the reconciliation between the royal couple, there were rumours that he was the father of Sophia Magdalena's firstborn.

These became the subject of accusations from the political opposition, as late as in 1786 and 1789, where it was claimed that the whole nation was aware of the rumour that the King had asked Munck to make the Queen pregnant. Pamphlets to that end were posted on street corners all over Stockholm.

=== Secret marriage ===
There were also a rumour of a secret marriage between Munck and the queen. The story about the secret marriage was described by the king's sister-in-law Hedwig Elizabeth Charlotte of Holstein-Gottorp and reads as follows: in 1775, when the marriage between the king's brother and sister-in-law did not lead to the birth of any issue, the king asked the queen to take a lover to provide the throne with an heir When she refused this suggestion, he asked for a reconciliation and selected Munck as a mediator with the thought that the queen would find Munck attractive, as she seemed to like his company and he was similar to her in his appearance. When Munck revealed the King's true wish and asked her to give in for the sake of the state and she again declined, the king divorced the queen in secret and had her married to Munck in a secret ceremony conducted by Johan Wingård The only witnesses to this marriage except Munck, the king and the queen, was Wingård, who were appointed bishop of Gothenburg to general amazement despite his youth. and Ramström. In 1779, Ramström left her position at court. It was widely rumoured at the time that Ramström had been forced to resign because of the queen's jealousy and that she had been given a pension on condition that she be silent about the relationship between Munck and the queen.

=== Poisoning ===
Ramström died from poisoning, and there were rumours at the time that she was poisoned to prevent her from revealing anything about the whole affair about the royal couple and the birth of the crown prince One rumour says that she was poisoned by oysters from the king. Another version, however, claim that she poisoned herself accidentally after having taken a medicine to perform an abortion

Ramström never married, but had three children with Adolf Fredrik Munck.
