= Ingrid Maria Wenner =

Swedish courtier (1731–1793)

Ingrid Maria Wenner, née Inger Marie Möller (1731–1793) was a Swedish (originally Danish) kammarfru of the queen consort of Sweden, Sophia Magdalena of Denmark. She was the confidant of the queen and played some part in the affair of the consummation of the marriage of King Gustav III of Sweden.

== Life ==
Reportedly, she was a member of the staff of Sophia Magdalena during her childhood in Denmark (though she is not confirmed as such until 1760), and belonged to her closest confidants. When Sophia Magdalena was to marry the Swedish crown prince in 1766, the future Gustav III, the marriage contract assured her the right to decide over her bedchamber staff, and to bring two Danes with her to Sweden. She chose three: her French teacher, Jeanne Rosselin, and her two Lady's maid: madam Hansen and Ingrid Maria Wenner.

In Sweden, the Danish chamber staff of Sophia Magdalena caused the first conflict between her and her spouse. Her mother-in-law, Louisa Ulrika of Prussia, accused them of being Danish spies. They did forward letters between Sophia Magdalena and the Danish ambassador, but this was mainly because Louisa Ulrika prevented him from seeing her, and he wished to give her advice as to accustom herself to the Swedish court. Crown prince Gustav supported his mother and attempted to have Sophia Magdalena send them back to Denmark. In 1770, she finally agreed to send first Rosselin and then Hansen back to Denmark. However, there was never any question of sending back Wenner, and Gustav III was forced to accept her presence at court until her death. He never liked her, claimed to find her ugly, and hated her Danish language.

In 1771, she married the royal footman Johan Ludvig Wenner, who was also a feldsher, and was appointed royal surgeon after marriage. Sophie Magdalena became the godmother of her son Martin Ludvig Wenner, likely made it possible for him to study medicine and appointed him her personal physician.

In 1775, King Gustav III assigned Adolf Fredrik Munck to assist him in the consummation of his marriage. Through Anna Sofia Ramström, he contacted Wenner, who was assigned to inform the queen of the king's wish, because she was married and the confidant of the queen. During the queen's pregnancy in 1778, the royal physician Abraham Bäck was scandalized by the fact that Adolf Fredrik Munck was allowed to move about freely in the queens bedchamber and discuss her pregnancy. At that point, Wenner took him aside and assured him that the king and queen had indeed consummated their marriage.

Axel von Fersen described her as: "A good and honest person, who never meddled in anything".

Wenner died in 1793. Twenty years later, when Queen Sophia Magdalena was dying, she asked her confessor Wallin, whether it was possible to see those you have loved after death. When he answered yes, she commented: "Then I will be able to see my mother again, my son, and the kind Wenner!"
