= Adolf Fredrik Munck =

Swedish noble (1749–1831)

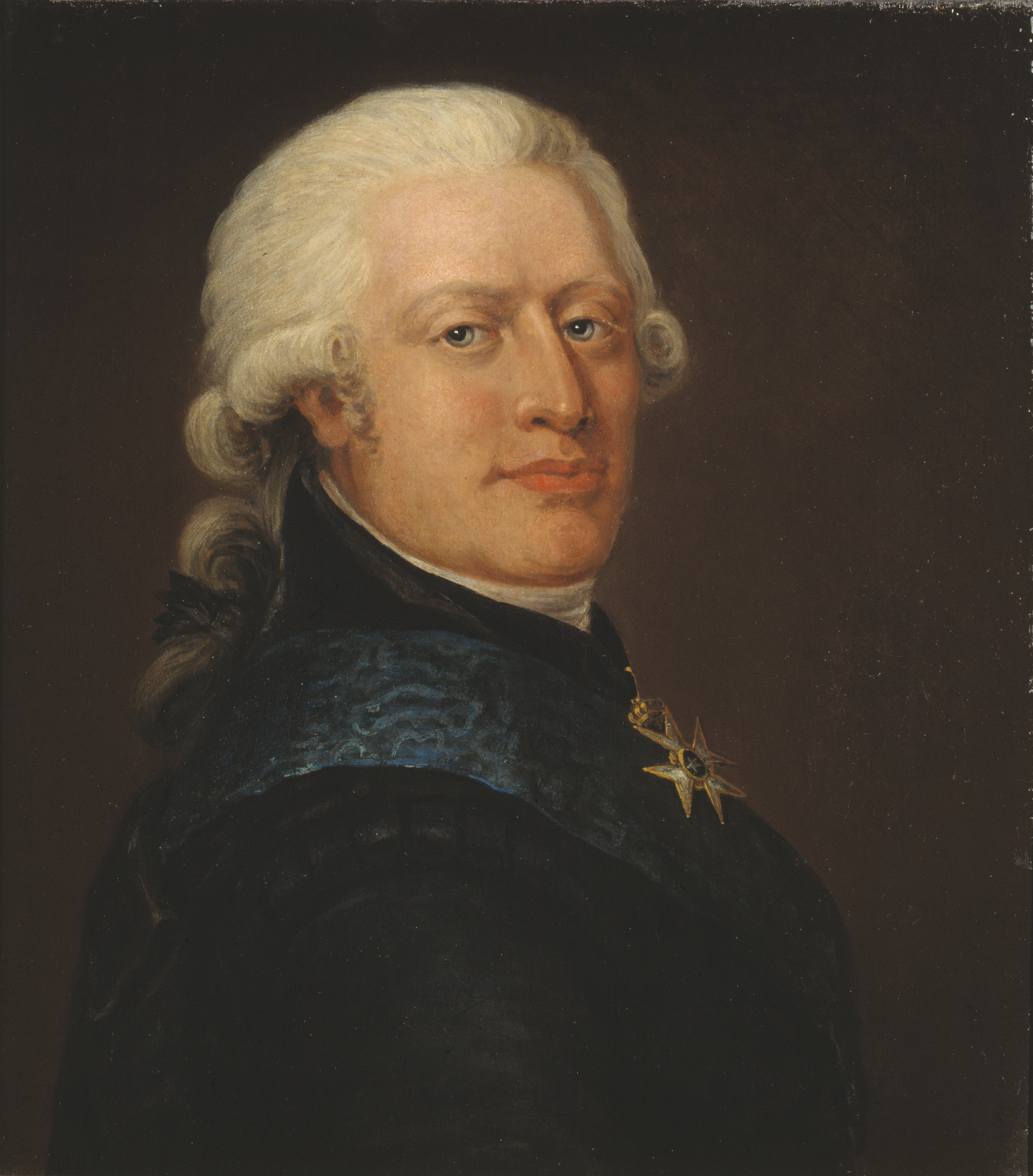
Munck as painted by Jonas Forsslund in 1799.

Adolf Fredrik, Count Munck (Mikkeli, Finland, 28 April 1749 – Massa, Italy, 18 July 1831), was a Swedish and Finnish noble during the Gustavian era. His family name is sometimes inaccurately given as "Munck af Fulkila" because his father usurped this family's title in the Swedish Diet but, as a matter of fact, without genealogical justification.

== Biography ==
Adolf Fredrik Munck was born to Anders Erik Munck (1720 Särestads sn, Skaraborg, 28 October 1720 – 4 September 1779) and wife Hedvig Juliana Wright (1729 – Lakspojo i Lojo sn, 30 December 1808), whom he had wed at St. Michel sn's then country church on 15 November 1747. The couple first lived in the second lieutenant's homestead Tarkia, part of the Rantakylä manor, in Mikkeli, the birthplace of their son Adolf Fredrik. They had a total of ten children, six of which lived to adult age.

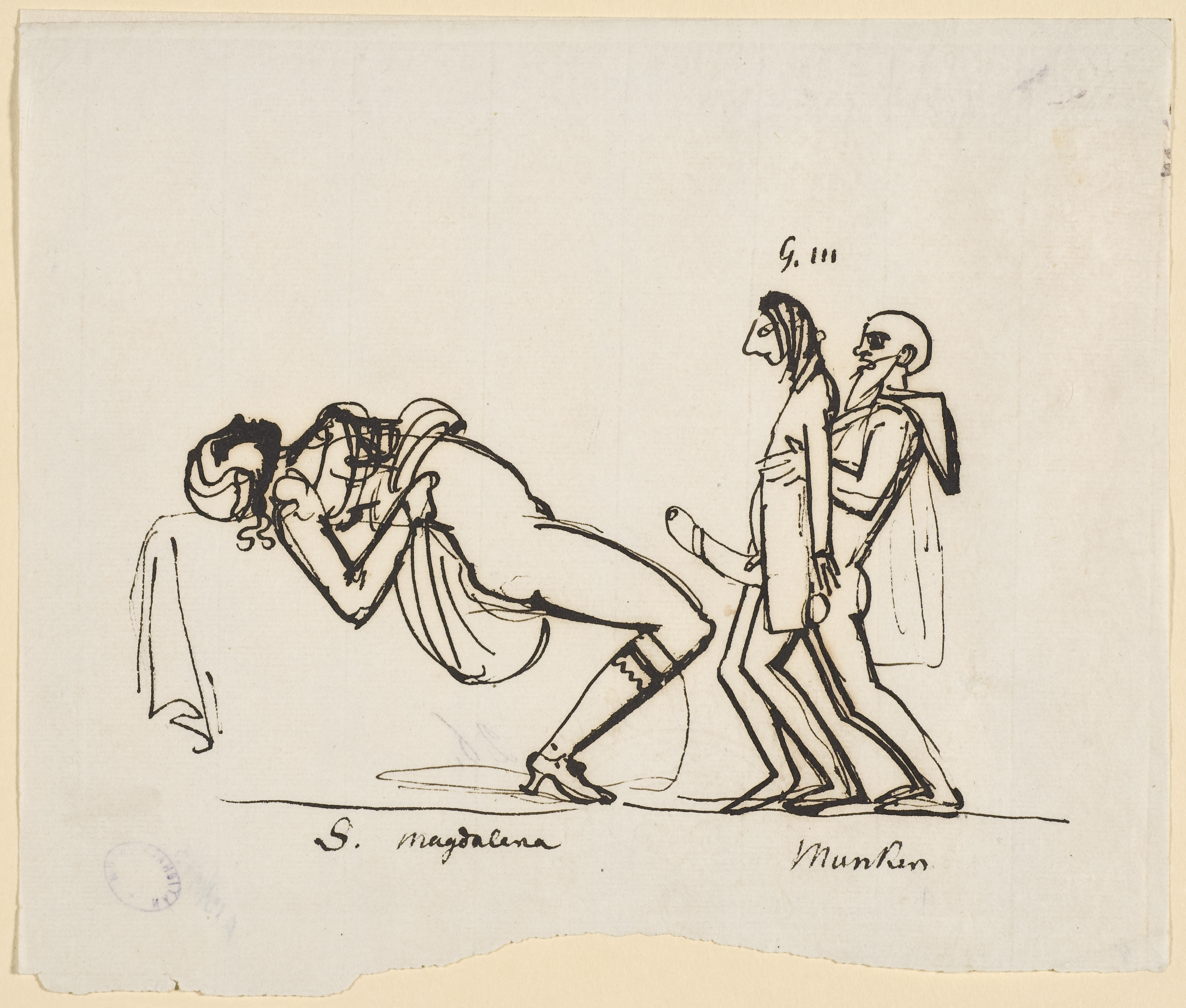
A drawing by Carl August Ehrensvärd (1745–1800) depicting the rumour that Munck assisted Gustav III and Sophia Magdalena in consummating their marriage. The drawing is held in the collection of the Nationalmuseum in Stockholm.

He entered the Swedish royal court, where he became a close friend of the king, Gustav III. Munck became notorious for his love affairs. Among his lovers was Anna Sofia Ramström, the kammarfru of the queen. In 1775, hired by the king to assist him in the consummation of his marriage with Queen Sophia Magdalena; he was to act as sexual instructor for the couple. The king, claiming to be sexually inexperienced called upon Munck to help him with a reconciliation with his spouse and instruct the couple in the ways of sexual intercourse and to physically show them how to consummate their marriage. Munck, a Finnish nobleman and at the time a stable master, was at that point the lover of Anna Sofia Ramström, the Queen's chambermaid. Through Anna Sofia Ramström, he contacted Ingrid Maria Wenner, who was assigned to inform the queen of the king's wish, because Wenner was married and the confidant of the queen. Munck and Ramström were to be present in a room close to the bedchamber, ready to be of assistance when needed, and he was at some points called into the bedchamber. Munck himself writes in his written account, which is preserved at the National Archives of Sweden, that in order to succeed, he was obliged to touch them both physically.

This "aid" resulted in the birth of the future King Gustav IV Adolf in 1778. These favors resulted in a great scandal when they became known. Munck was widely spoken of as the lover of the king and the queen. When it became known that Munck participated in the reconciliation between the royal couple, there were rumours that he was the father of Sophia Magdalena's firstborn.

These became the subject of accusations from the political opposition, as late as in 1786 and 1789, where it was claimed that the whole nation was aware of the rumour that the king had asked Munck to make the queen pregnant. Pamphlets to that end were posted on street corners all over Stockholm.

There was also a rumour of a secret marriage between Munck and the queen. The story about the secret marriage was described by the king's sister-in-law Hedwig Elizabeth Charlotte of Holstein-Gottorp and reads as follows: in 1775, when the marriage between the king's brother and sister-in-law did not lead to the birth of any issue, the king asked the queen to take a lover to provide the throne with an heir. When she refused this suggestion, he asked for a reconciliation and selected Munck as a mediator with the thought that the queen would find Munck attractive, as she seemed to like his company and he was similar to her in his appearance. When Munck revealed the king's true wish and asked her to give in for the sake of the state and she again declined, the king divorced the queen in secret and had her married to Munck in a secret ceremony conducted by Johan Wingård. The only witnesses to this marriage except Munck, the king and the queen, was Wingård, who was appointed bishop of Gothenburg to general amazement despite his youth and Anna Sofia Ramström, who was fired from her position at court and was later poisoned, though the circumstances behind her death were never confirmed. It was widely rumoured at the time that Ramström had been forced to resign in 1779 because of the queen's jealousy and that she had been given a pension on condition that she be silent about the relationship between Munck and the queen.

Munck was believed to have been rewarded by both the king and the queen for his support. He received a portrait of the queen by herself set in diamonds. He was appointed Master of the Horse (Riksstallmästare), knight and governor of the Royal Order of the Seraphim. He was created Baron (Friherre) Munck af Fulkila on 27 December 1778 (introduced in registry of the nobility in 1788, under nr 309), and finally Count Greve Munck af Fulkila on 4 July 1788 (introduced 16 May 1789 under nr 103). In 1787, Sophia Magdalena deposited a sum of 50,000 riksdaler in an account for Munck, which was generally rumoured to be a "farewell gift". At this point, Munck had started an affair with the ballerina Giovanna Bassi, whom Sophia Magdalena showed a great dislike for. The king was terrified when he heard that the queen had made that deposit, and he tried to prevent the transaction from becoming public knowledge, which, however, did not succeed.

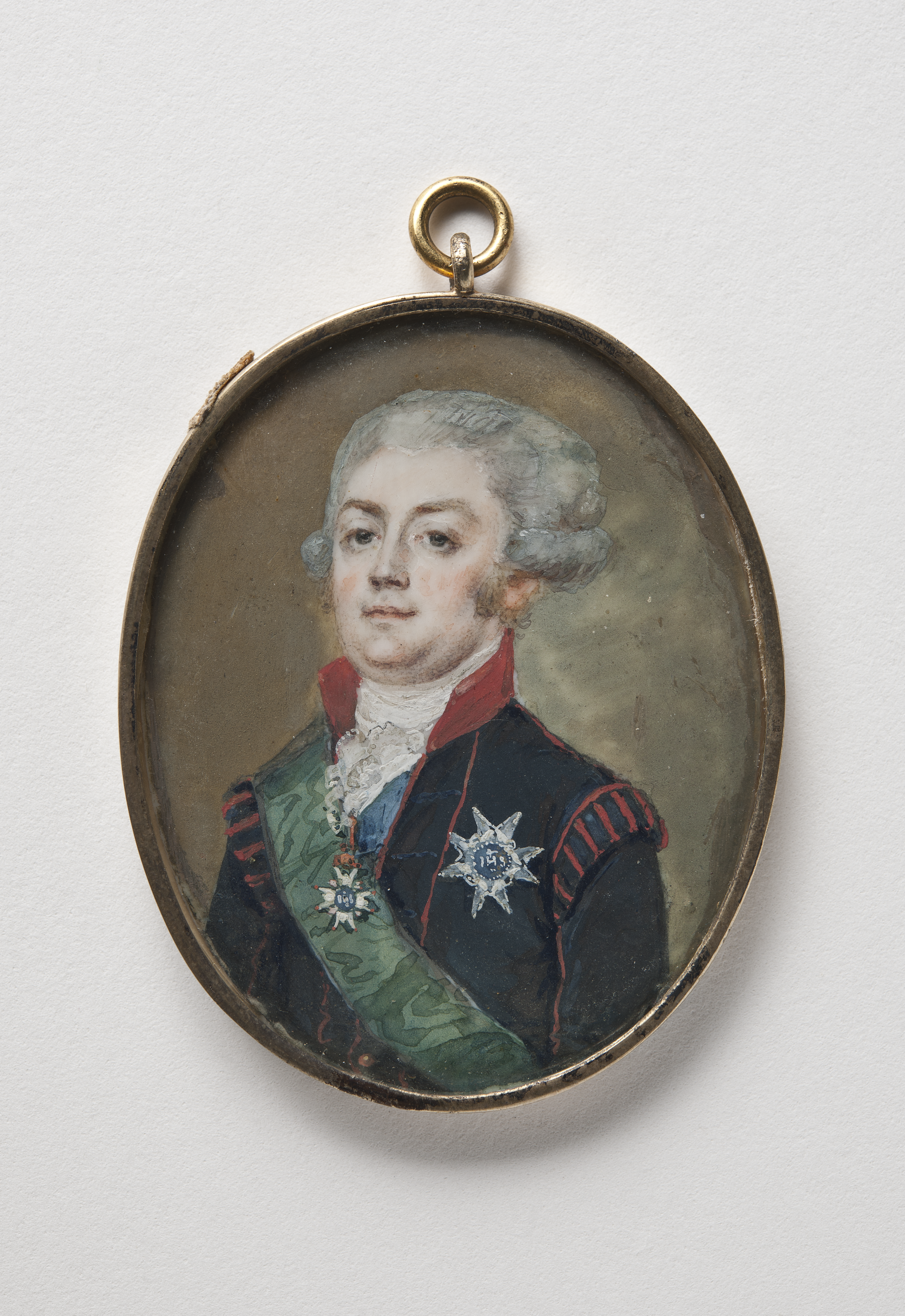
Portrait miniature of Munck by Anton Ulrik Berndes

A child of Giovanna Bassi's, rumoured to be the child of Munck, bore a strong likeness to the crown prince.

These allegations had longstanding consequences: after Gustav IV Adolf was deposed in 1809, the Gustavian party tried to get his son Gustav accepted as crown prince in 1809 and 1810, but were unsuccessful. The Swedish princess Hedwig Elizabeth Charlotte of Holstein-Gottorp, queen in 1809, was one of the leading people of the Gustavian party. She often visited ex-queen Frederica in her house arrest and worked for Prince Gustav to be acknowledged as heir to the throne. She wrote of this issue in her diaries: during a dinner, General Georg Adlersparre told her that Jean Baptiste Bernadotte had asked whether she had any issue, and was interested when he found she had not. She said that the throne already had an heir in the deposed king's son. Adlersparre became upset and expressed the opinion of his party, that no one of the instigators of the coup would accept this, as they feared that the boy would revenge against them when he became king, and that they would go as far as take up the old rumour that the deposed king was in fact illegitimate and the son of Queen Sophia Magdalena and Count Adolf Fredrik Munck af Fulkila to prevent this. The affair has also inspired literature: it was part of the plot in Carl Jonas Love Almquist's Drottningens juvelsmycke, the first historical novel written in Swedish.

In 1791, he was discovered creating forged notes on Drottningholm Palace, abetting Charles Appelkvist. In 1791, the king was to have contemplated divorcing the queen by exposing her alleged secret marriage to Munck. After the death of the king in 1792, Count Munck af Fulkila was forced to leave Sweden. Before his departure, the regent, Duke Charles, demanded that he turn over certain documents that could scandalize the royal house if they became known. In 1795, he asked for permission to return to Sweden, and when denied, he reportedly threatened to expose the marriage certificate between himself and the queen. He was ennobled as a count in the Duchy of Parma and Piacenza in 1816. Munck had moved to Italy in the 1790s and lived there until his death in 1831 in Massa, Tuscany, at the age of 82.
