= Chamber Woman =

European royal court office

A Chamber Woman (Danish: Kammerfrue; German: Kammerfrau; Swedish: Kammarfru) was a court office in several European courts.

The Chamber Woman was in charge of the wardrobe, cosmetics and other matters concerning the domestic management of the personal chambers of a royal woman. She had about the equivalent task in the household of a royal woman as a personal Lady's maid, and assisted with dressing, undressing and bathing the royal woman. She supervised the chambermaids and the domestic concerns of the court of a royal woman, which was then performed by the servants. She was in rank between the ladies-in-waiting of the nobility and the domestic servants. In Sweden, the kammarfru was normally a woman not from the nobility, but from the wealthy burgher class.

== Notable examples ==
- Catharina Ahlgren
- Ingrid Maria Wenner
- Anna Sofia Ramström

== See also ==
- Woman of the Bedchamber, British equivalent
- Première femme de Chambre, French equivalent
