= Arfwedson =

Arfwedson is a surname. Notable people with the surname include:

- Camilla Arfwedson (born 1981), English actress
- Carl Abraham Arfwedson (1774–1861), Swedish silk merchant and artist
- Charlotta Arfwedson (1776–1862), Swedish countess and artist
- Johan August Arfwedson (1792–1841), Swedish chemist
