= Marcelle Tascher de la Pagerie =

French noblewoman (1792–1866)

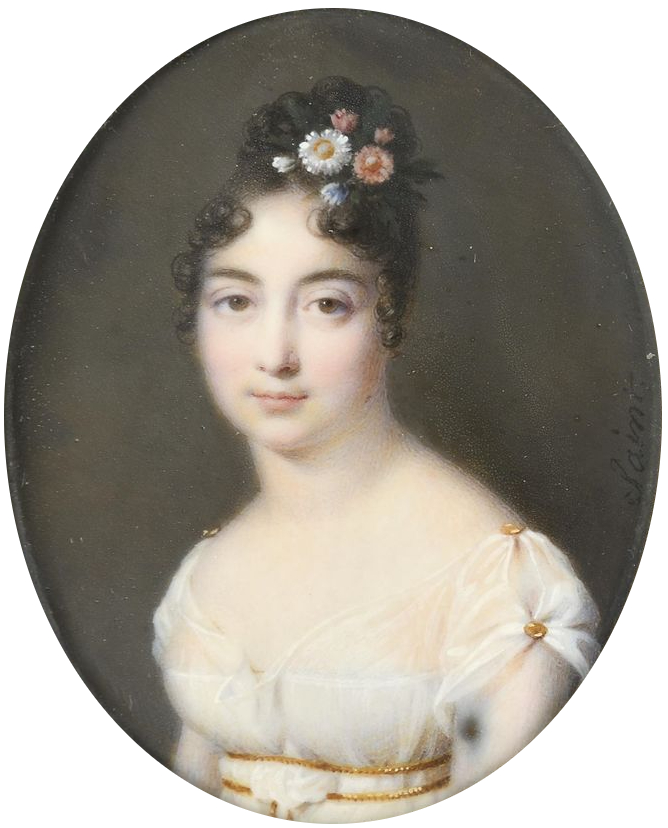
Portrait miniature of Marcelle Tascher de la Pagerie, née Clary, by Daniel Saint

Marie-Marseille-Adéle "Marcelle" Tascher de la Pagerie née Clary (1792–1866) was a French countess. She served as överhovmästarinna for her paternal aunt, the Swedish Queen Désirée Clary.

Marcelle Tascher de la Pagerie was the daughter of Etienne-Francois Clary (1757–1823) and Catherine-Marguerite-Marseille Guey (d. 1804) and married the cousin of Empress Josephine de Beauharnais, count Henri de Tascher de la Pagerie (d. 1816).

In 1823, she accompanied her paternal aunt to Sweden, when Désirée went there to assume her post as Queen at the occasion of her son's wedding to Josephine of Leuchtenberg. Among the rest of the French retinue was the sons of marshal Michel Ney as well as the two female and one male chamber servant Eleonore Felix, Virginie Brunot and Louis Brunot.

The arrival of Queen Desiree, who had lived in France for eleven years, made it necessary to form a Queen's Household, which had by then not existed at the Swedish court for several years. A great entourage of ladies-in-waiting where appointed, among them her husband's mistress Mariana Koskull and her son's mistress Jacquette Löwenhielm, and for the first time since the Union of Sweden and Norway, Norwegian ladies-in-waiting where also appointed. The king appointed Caroline Lewenhaupt to the office of senior lady-in-waiting. She had served Desiree in that capacity during Desiree's first stay in Sweden in 1810-11 as well as to the late queen and thus the last person to hold the office at the royal court, and her appointment was a practical solution - she was simply said to have retained the office, and was called in to serve. Aware of the queen's great dislike of etiquette, the occasion also prompted the king to introduced several reforms in court life, and he abolished several customs such as the public dinner and the kissing of the queen's skirt during court presentations.

Caroline Lewenhaupt was replaced as head lady-in-waiting by Marcelle Tascher. She was the favorite and foremost companion of her aunt, whose favorite conversation was to talk about her life in France, and had Tascher who could remember it. In contrast to the favorite of Desiree from her last visit in 1811, Elise la Flotte, Marcelle Tascher became popular and well liked in Sweden. She was given her own apartment in the Royal Palace, where she entertained frequently and held a salon for the diplomatic world. She was described:

"Of the foreign entourage who now became a part of our court, the foremost places where occupied by countess Tascher and her brother-in-law count Louis Tascher. The former, née Clary, a niece of the queen, was a lively dark-eyed beauty who, married to a nephew of empress Josephine, during the short tenure of Joseph Bonaparte's reign in Spain was the most beautiful pearl of his court. She was now appointed court mistress of the queen, whose complete confidence she owned. Friendly, humorous, accommodating, and thus in all the opposite of madame La Flotte, who accompanied the crown princess to Stockholm in 1811 and was so little liked in Stockholm, she soon made friends at court. Her salon swiftly became a center of the youth of the court as well as for the corps diplomatique, who did not neglect to conduct the secret spying of their trade behind the screen of courtly politeness."

The success of Tascher in Swedish court life somewhat made the queen's refusal to adapt to court etiquette less noticed, and the queen also benefited from Tascher's success and became more involved in social life through her.

Tascher missed France, however, and eventually left Sweden. Désirée commented: "you see, that in my retiring position I prefer to be alone, I am better occupied then, so much more as she seldom share this retirement with me, and her pleasures caused me to feel the lack of mine so much more; I was always in the shadow, and she was the Sun." After she had left, the queen wished to leave for France herself, but was prevented by the king. Her departure also made the queen's difficulty in adapting to court etiquette more noticed, and she eventually started to retire more from court life. Désirée reportedly felt lonely and isolated, and started to spend more time with the silk merchant Carl Abraham Arfwedson, who had lived in her home during her upbringing and with whom she liked to talk with of France, a friendship which caused rumors that they once had a romance. Upon her coronation in 1829, Désirée commented that she missed Tascher: "It will be very difficult, and I would have needed Marcelle here to given me courage, but I must give that up."

Court offices
Preceded by Caroline Lewenhaupt	Överhovmästarinna to the Queen of Sweden; 1823–1829	Succeeded by Vilhelmina Gyldenstolpe
