= Schandorff =

Schandorff is a surname. Notable people with the surname include:

- Axel Schandorff (1925–2016), Danish track cyclist
- Frederik Schandorff (born 1996), Danish racing driver
- Maria Schandorff (1784–1848), Norwegian philanthropist and social educator
- Silja Schandorff (born 1969), Danish ballerina
