= Elisabet Charlotta Piper =

Swedish lady-in-waiting (1787–1860)

Elisabet Charlotta Piper (26 April 1787 - 26 February 1860), was a Swedish court official. She served as överhovmästarinna (Senior lady-in-waiting) to the crown princess of Sweden, Josephine of Leuchtenberg, from 1823 to 1835.

She was the daughter of Count Eric Ruuth and Elisabet Charlotta Wahrendorff, and married her sisters brother-in-law, the courtier count Erik Piper (1773-1833) in 1805, with whom she had two children.

She was appointed senior lady-in-waiting upon the arrival of the new crown princess in 1823. She was persuaded to accept the post after it had been declined by Aurora Wilhelmina Brahe:

"There had been eager hopes that countess Brahe would accept the office as senior lady-in-waiting at the new court, but she could not be enticed to. She did agree to accept the task to depart for Lubeck and receive the crown princess, whose German ladies were both to depart from her there. To the post of senior lady-in-waiting was instead appointed countess Erik Piper, a lady in every aspect worthy of her office, which neither she accepted without difficulty. As she by birth and wealth had come to be in an independent as well as pleasurable position, it may have been a sacrifice which was not entirely compensated by the award the titles and honors could offer vanity."

Jacob De la Gardie described her:

"Countess Piper is one of the most accomplished people of the higher society. Good breeding, complete grace, noble mind, much dignity and a behavior high above all reproach where characteristics generally attributed to her, and gave her a well deserved good name."

Queen Désirée compared her favorably to her own senior lady-in-waiting Vilhelmina Gyldenstolpe in a letter to her sister Julie Clary in March 1831:

"I am sure you have found countess Piper to be very pleasant and entertaining; she is an exceptional person [un phénix]. Joséphine is lucky to be given her as a dame d'honneur, my own is an icicle!"

She was succeeded by Charlotta Skjöldebrand in 1836.
