= Caroline Lewenhaupt =

Swedish courtier, poet and amateur actress

Caroline (Karolina Juliana Anna Ulrika) Lewenhaupt (1754–1826) was a Swedish courtier, poet and amateur actress.

== Life ==
Caroline Lewenhaupt was born at Oberbronn, the daughter of Count Adam Lewenhaupt and Carolina Christina Anna Louise Sinclair. She married her cousin Count Charles Emil Lewenhaupt in Strasbourg in 1778. She was brought up in France, and was described as witty, intelligent and jolly.

=== Reign of Gustav III ===
Caroline Lewenhaupt had a long career at the royal Swedish court. She served as hovfröken (maid of honor) to Queen Sophia Magdalena in 1771-74 and kammarfröken to Princess Charlotte in 1774-76 prior to her marriage.

From 1781 until 1795, she served as statsfru (Lady of the Bedchamber) to Queen Sophia Magdalena. She was considered suitable in the role of cheering up the reserved Queen Sophia Magdalena, and was reportedly well liked by her. She was present at the death of the Queen in 1813.

Caroline Lewenhaupt played a notable part in the famous amateur theater in the royal court of King Gustav III of Sweden. In the Christmas of 1775 at Gripsholm Castle, the monarch founded a theater society to organize the popular amateur theater at the royal court. Caroline Lewenhaupt was appointed chairperson or "Grand Mistress" of the theatrical society, with Johan Gabriel Oxenstierna as the official poet and orator. The most noted of the actors in the amateur theater of Gustav III were named as Caroline Lewenhaupt, Carl von Fersen, Hedvig Ulrika De la Gardie, Nils Barck, Maria Aurora Uggla, Otto Jacob von Manteuffel Zöge, Bror Cederström and the sisters Ulla von Höpken and Augusta Löwenhielm.

Lewenhaupt and Uggla were counted as the primadonnas of the amateur theater, and often played the leading parts. On 7 January 1776, for example, she played the part of Countess in La Gageuse with Gustav III as the Colonel, in which, according to Fredrik Sparre, the French Ambassador claimed that the part could not have been better given at any theater in Paris.

=== Later court service ===
In January–June 1811, she served as överhovmästarinna to the Crown Princess, Désirée Clary, and welcomed her upon her arrival to Sweden in the company of hovfröken Mariana Koskull. Her relationship with the crown princess was not good, and reportedly, Elise la Flotte successfully encouraged Desiree to harass Lewenhaupt, so that she could be replaced in her office by la Flotte. It was the task of Lewenhaupt to inform Desiree about the issues of etiquette, which the crown princess disliked and did not wish to adjust to. There were, additionally, tensions about rank. When Caroline Lewenhaupt introduced her daughters to Desiree and named their status as countesses of the Holy German Empire, Desiree commented: "Madame, I do not forget that I am the daughter of a tradesman." The conflict ended when the crown prince managed to have la Flotte appointed deputy of Lewenhaupt. Caroline Lewenhaupt remained in Sweden when Désirée departed for France in 1811, not to be back for eleven years.

In 1818, Caroline Lewenhaupt succeeded Christina Charlotta Stjerneld as överhovmästarinna to Queen Hedvig Elisabeth Charlotte. The queen, however, was widowed later that same year and Lewenhaupt was replaced by Charlotta Aurora De Geer.

In 1823, she was again called in to serve as head of the queen's household upon the return of Désirée Clary, now queen, who had been absent from Sweden for eleven years. She had served Desiree in that capacity during Desiree's first stay in Sweden in 1810–11 as well as to the late queen and thus the last person to hold the office at the royal court, and her appointment was a practical solution - she was simply said to have retained the office, and was called in to serve. However, neither Lewenhaupt nor Desiree had any good experience of their previous experiences in 1811, and when Caroline Lewenhaupt introduced her daughters to Desiree as named their status as countesses of the Holy German Empire, Desiree commented: "Madame, I do not forget that I am the daughter of a tradesman." She was replaced in her office by Marcelle Tascher de la Pagerie.

Lewenhaupt died in Linköping.

== Writer ==
Caroline Lewenhaupt was also known to have written many of the texts to the poems which were read at different occasions at court. In 1825, she published Les apparitions. Mélo-drame. Représenté devant la famille royale le 30 janvier 1825./(C.L.) (Stockholm, imprimé chez Charles Deleen, 1825.)

== Sources ==
- Gerd Ribbing (1958). Gustav III:s hustru. Sofia Magdalena. Stockholm: Alb. Bonniers Boktryckeri. ISBN
- Gerd Ribbing (1959). Ensam drottning. Sofia Magdalena 1783–1813. Stockholm: Alb. Bonniers Boktryckeri. ISBN
- Oscar Levertin (1918). Samlade Skrifter 17–18. Stockholm: Albert Bonniers Förlag. ISBN
- https://web.archive.org/web/20110903184302/http://sv.wikisource.org/wiki/Svenska_teatern/Hofvets_teatern%C3%B6jen_p%C3%A5_Gripsholm_1775-76
- Svenska teatern : några anteckningar 1. Under gustavianska tidehvarfvet jämte en återblick på dess tidigare öden
- Cecilia af Klercker (1939). Hedvig Elisabeth Charlottas dagbok VIII (1807–1811). Stockholm: Norstedt & Söners förlag
- http://www.adelsvapen.com/genealogi/Lewenhaupt_nr_2

Court offices
Preceded by Christina Charlotta Stjerneld	Överhovmästarinna to the Queen of Sweden; 1818 and 1823	Succeeded by Marcelle Tascher de la Pagerie
