= Koskull family =

Aristocratic family of Livonian origin

Koskull
- Imperial Comital family

- Coat of arms of Swedish branch
- Parent family: Caupo of Turaida
- Country: Historical: Russian Empire; Kingdom of Sweden; Holy Roman Empire; Kingdom of Prussia; Duchy of Livonia; Duchy of Estonia; Duchy of Courland and Semigallia
- Current region: Sweden, Russia, Poland, Latvia, Germany, Finland, Estonia, Denmark.
- Earlier spellings: Koskele
- Origin: Livonia
- Founded: 1302
- Founder: Andreas de Koskele
- Current head: Johan Koskull (1938)
- Style: His/Her Illustrious Highness
- Connected families: Lieven
- Cadet branches: Pahlen

The Koskull family (Latvian: Koskuli, Russian: Коскуль), also written as Koschkull, is a wealthy aristocratic family of Livonian and German origin, famous for their extensive lands and manors. The family is descended from the first King of Livonia and officially established in Livonia as Koskele in 1302. The family spread to Estonia, Courland and Poland in the 15th century, Sweden and Finland in the 17th century, and Prussia and Russia in the 18th century. Several branches of the family still exist today. The Koskulls are believed to be related to the von der Pahlen family.

The Koskulls were enrolled in the Livonian Knighthood in 1742, in the Estonian Knighthood in 1777, and in the Courland Knighthood in 1841. In 1834, the family was granted a baron rank in Prussia. The title of imperial count was bestowed upon the family in 1805 by Francis II, and in 1898, members of the family also became counts in Imperial Russia. In Sweden, the family was granted noble status in 1638, and two branches were uplifted to baron status in 1719 and 1720. The title of imperial count was later transferred by decree to a Swedish branch of the family. Currently, the Swedish branch owns 20,000 hectares across the United Kingdom and an estate of 6,000 hectares in Sweden, called Engaholm. The family's combined net worth is estimated to be $1.6 billion.

== History ==
=== Origins ===
The first written information on the family dates back to 1302, when Andreas de Koskele was mentioned as a vassal in the Archbishopric of Riga. It is believed that he was the grandson of Gerhard de Koskele, the illegitimate son of Emperor Frederick II. It is most probable that Gerhard was part of the Livonian Crusades, which would explain his marriage to Magdalena, the daughter of Caupo of Turaida.

The Koskull family claim descent from Caupo of Turaida, who was considered the first King of Livonia and who helped Bishop Meinhard spread Christianity in the region. Caupo himself converted to Christianity in 1186, and traveled to Rome to meet with Pope Innocent III in 1203. The Pope had granted and confirmed the title of Caupo of Livonia, along with a coat of arms depicting three golden lilies on a purple background. The Koskull family and the Lieven family bear similar coats of arms: three lilies positioned identically. Furthermore, both families have traced their origins to Caupo of Turaida.

=== Relation to the Von Der Pahlen family ===
It is believed that the Koskull family shares a common origin with the von der Pahlen family, who appeared in the region around the same time, and have a similar coat of arms bearing three sea leaves. According to a legend, the family owned both sides of Lake Burtnieks during the 13th century, but due to a dispute between two brothers, it was decided that one brother would keep the Burtnieki side, while the other would keep the opposite side. The brother with the Burtnieki side had an oak beam with iron tires rammed into the lake to indicate the border, and also adopted a different name: von der Pahlen. He then made a new coat of arms by changing the background color of the Koskulls' coat of arms to yellow while retaining the lake leaves, and hung the new arms on the oak beam; thus, the von der Pahlen family was born.

=== Baltic branches ===
The Koskulls are among the oldest Livonian families and were among the most influential and respected families in Terra Mariana. The first written information on the family appeared about the vassal of the Archbishop of Riga, Andreas de Koskele, in 1302. Throughout the 14th century, the family acquired vast lands and large manors. In the 14th century, the family owned land in the Dikli-Augstroze parish region of Līvu galā, now known as the Dikļi and Umurga parishes. Several family members participated in wars on behalf of the Livonian Confederation, such as Klaus Koskull, whose name appears in the 1423 Treaty of Melno. The family was enrolled into the Livonian Knighthood under Nr 33, Estonian Knighthood under Nr 29 and into the Curonian Knighthood under Nr 138, all with a baron title. The family was also enrolled with a count title into the Livonian Knighthood under Nr 328, and into the Curonian Knighthood under Nr 260.

They are one of a few families who emigrated from Germany to Livonia during the Livonian Crusades in the 13th century. First mentioned in 1302, the family settled in the northern part of the Archdiocese of Riga (present-day Dickeln parish), and acquired many estates during the colonization period. Their primary ancestral estates consisted of Lappier, Koskullshof (Stumpen), Schujen, Pahlen and Seckendorf. The family also owned the estates Napküll, Sutzen, Kulsdorf, Mazauce, Ostrominski (Košķele) as well as the village of Lemskull. During the 14th century, the family branched out to nearby dioceses (1385-04-25—Mauritius, Berend and Godeke Koskull are mentioned in the diocese of Dorpat. 1360-05-09—Andreas Koskull in Osel). The family held important positions in the archdiocese, such as Brand Koskull (bailiff at Turaida Castle from 1417–1420), and Jakob Koskull (bailiff at the Koknese Castle in 1469) and held significant estates, mainly in Ubbenorm and the surrounding parishes. From Livonia, the family branched out to Courland and Estonia. Reinhold Koskull, who moved to Courland in 1603 from Dorpat, started a branch there. His descendants acquired significant estates in the areas of Grobin, Windau and Talsen. Peter von Koskull acquired the Asuppen and Adsirn estates in 1719. The Baltic branch of the Koskulls still exists today.

=== Swedish branches ===
The Koskull family first appeared in Sweden in the 1450s, when Brand Koskull the Elder emigrated from Livonia. From then on, members of the family held high positions in armies, courts, and the royal palace. The family is widely known in Sweden, as several towns are named after the family, such as Koskullskulle and Kosta. The Koskulls are also notable in Sweden because some members, notably Aurora Wilhelmina Koskull and Mariana Koskull, were royal mistresses of several European kings. The relationship between the royal family and the Koskulls was viewed as very close, which rendered the family very influential within the aristocracy. At some stage, the family had close relations with Napoleon I; however, it is unclear if it was confined to Mariana and Aurora Koskull or if it extended to other family members. They are also founders of Kosta Boda, a famous Swedish glassworks which was founded in 1742 by General Anders Koskull and Georg Bogislaus Staël von Holstein. The family had three branches in Sweden, nr 248, 160, and 184. All three branches held noble or baron titles, with branch Nr 184 being the sole surviving Swedish branch today.

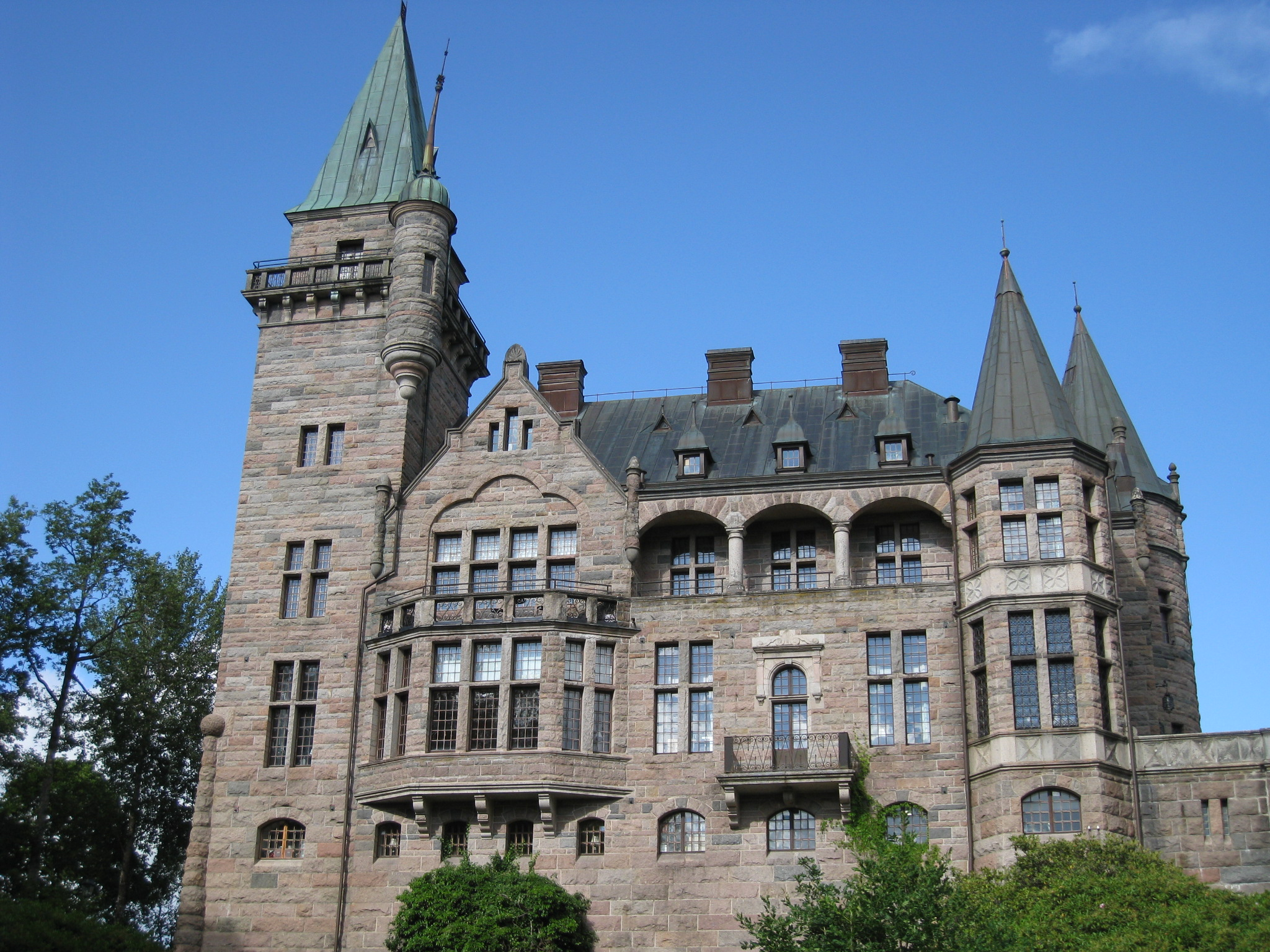
The Teleborg Castle in Växjö, Sweden. Built for Anna Koskull as a wedding present in 1900.

One of many Manors of the Engaholm Estate

The first branch, Nr 248, was presented in 1638 by Anders Koskull the Young (great-great-grandson of Brand Koskull the Elder), who served as a lieutenant and colonel of various regiments. In 1642, he became the Governor of Tartu County, and in 1656 he became Governor of Viborg County. He was naturalized in 1638 as a nobleman by Queen Christina and eventually ascened to the rank of major general before his death in 1676. His wife was Maria Catharina Frankelin, whose mother was Constantina Eriksdotter, the daughter of King Erik XIV and Agda Persdotter. Their daughters married into the Boije af Gennäs, von Stackelberg, and von Weissensée families. Their eldest son, Anders, was a major in the Ostgöta infantry and married to a Klingspor. Family branch Nr 248 contained many notable individuals; however, the branch's last member died in 1748. The second branch, Nr 160, was part of Nr 248 until Major General Anders Koskull (son of Erik Koskull) was elevated to a baron rank in 1719. He was married three times and had 9 children; however, all of his sons died without an heir. He was the Lord of Engaholm, which he passed on to his son-in-law, a Koskull from branch Nr 184. Anders Koskull himself closed the branch in 1742. The third branch, Nr 184, was also elevated in 1720 from branch 248. Otto Johan Koskull was known to be the right hand of King Carl XII, fighting in numerous Swedish and Polish wars, thus he was elevated to a title. His wife was Märta Bonde, daughter of the von de Noth family. One of their sons, Ulric Carl, went into the Russian service as did his sons after him. The branch survived thanks to the youngest son of Otto Johan, the equestrian master Anders Gustaf who married a relative from the Koskull branch Nr 160. The family was then divided into two smaller branches. The main branch descends from Anders Gustaf's son, a court lieutenant named Otto Anders Koskull, who had several children with Amalia Beata Silfversparre. The younger branch comes from war councilor Gustaf Fredrik Koskull, who married Anna Charlotta Gjelstrup in Hamburg. Their son, Anders Erik Koskull, a court marshal, married Johanna Fredrica Sophia Fleming af Liebelitz. As of 2004, the head of the family is Johan Koskull (born 1938) who owns and resides in the family estate Engaholm in Småland.

=== Russian branch ===
In Imperial Russia the family was enrolled in the “General Armorial of the Noble Families of the Russian Empire” in the 17th part. On 20 January 1805, Emperor Franz II granted Joseph Koskull an imperial count title, the highest count title of the Holy Roman Empire. In May 1897, the State council allowed the great-grandson of Imperial Count Joseph Koskull, Court counselor Nikolai Karl Irnest Gospfor von Koskull, to transfer his county title to his relative Friedrich Ernest Alexander Karlov von Koskull. The new title was later approved by a certain ruling senate on 5 November 1898. On 12 November that year, the same ruling senate granted Adam Karl Edward Wilhelm Alexander von Koskull, the oldest son of Count Friedrich Ernest Alexander von Koskull, permission to use the title of count following the death of his father. The diploma for the Count's dignity was signed on 2 January 1902.

A member of the Russian branch, Count Mikhail Frantsovich Koskull (1825-1869), married Princess Varvara Petrovna Shcherbatova. Together they had one daughter, Countess Sofia Mikhailovna Koskull, who was married to Count Nikolay Feliksovich Sumarokov-Elston, the suspected grandson of King Federick William IV of Prussia. Their son Mikhail Nikolaevich Sumarokov-Elston was considered the best tennis player in the Russian Empire, and 6th in the world at the time. Along with Alexander Alenitsy, he was the first Russian tennis player to participate in the Summer Olympic Games, and regularly played with Emperor Nicholas II. Because Countess Sofia Koskull's nephew-in-law was Prince Felix Yusupov, the last of the Yusupov princes and the richest man in the Russian Empire, the Koskull family had access to extreme wealth until the Russian Revolution. Only Mikhail Sumarokov-Elston survived the revolution by boarding HMS Marlborough to Malta with his cousin Prince Felix Yusupov.

Several settlements in Russia are named after the family; separate villages in the Bolsherechensky, Tyukalinsky and Tarsky districts of the Omsk region, a village in the Krasnoarmeisk district of the Chelyabinsk region, and a lake in the Chanovsky district of the Novosibirsk region.

=== Prussian branch ===
Not much is known about the Prussian branch except that Lieutenant General Ernst von Koschkull (1775-1856) and his two nephews, Lieutenant General Leonhard von Koschkull (1798-1872) and First Lieutenant Alexander von Koschkull (1799-1839) were granted a baron title on 11 March 1834. The family branch came from the Courland branch.

== Coat of Arms ==
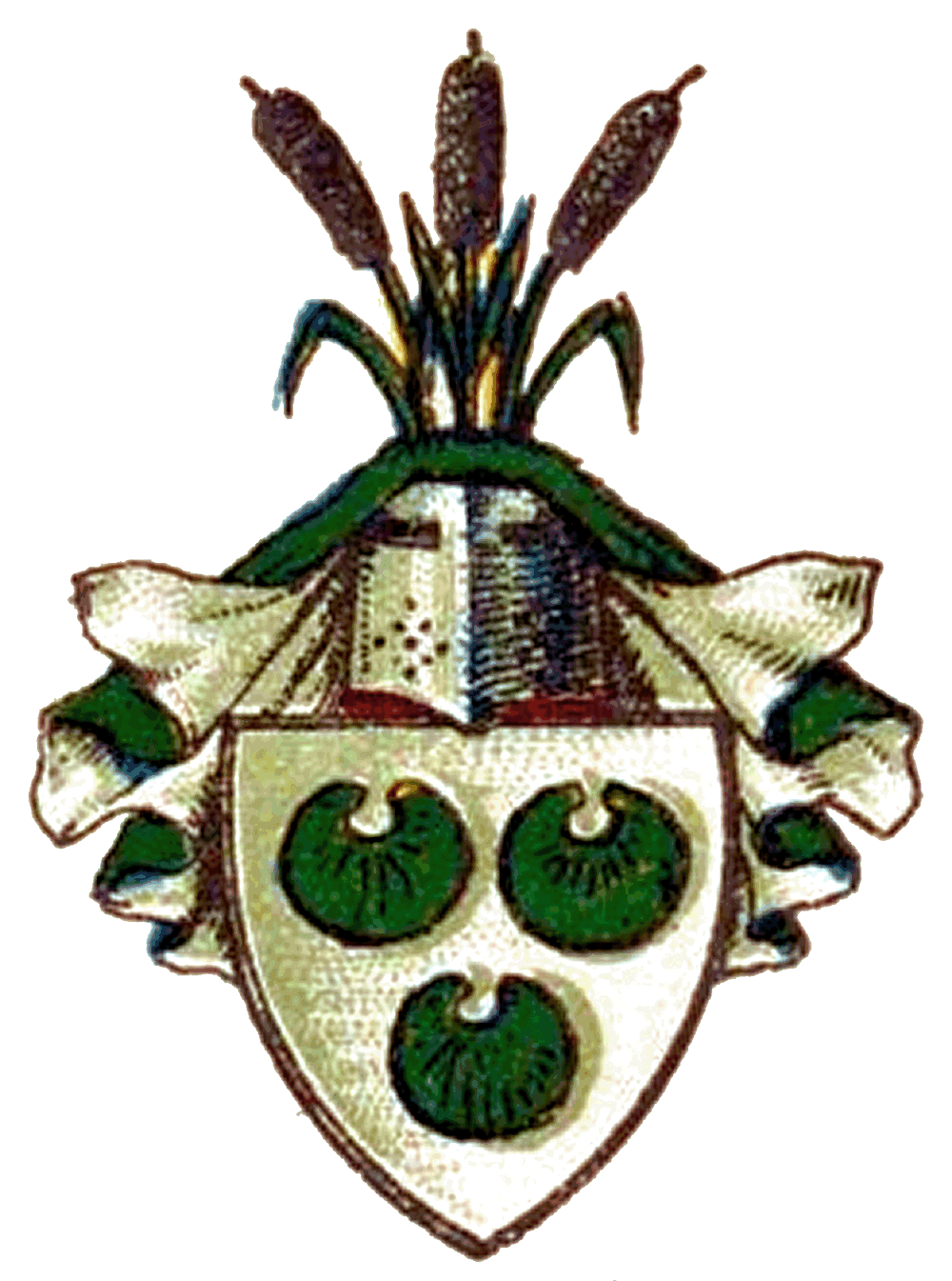
Baltic coat of arms

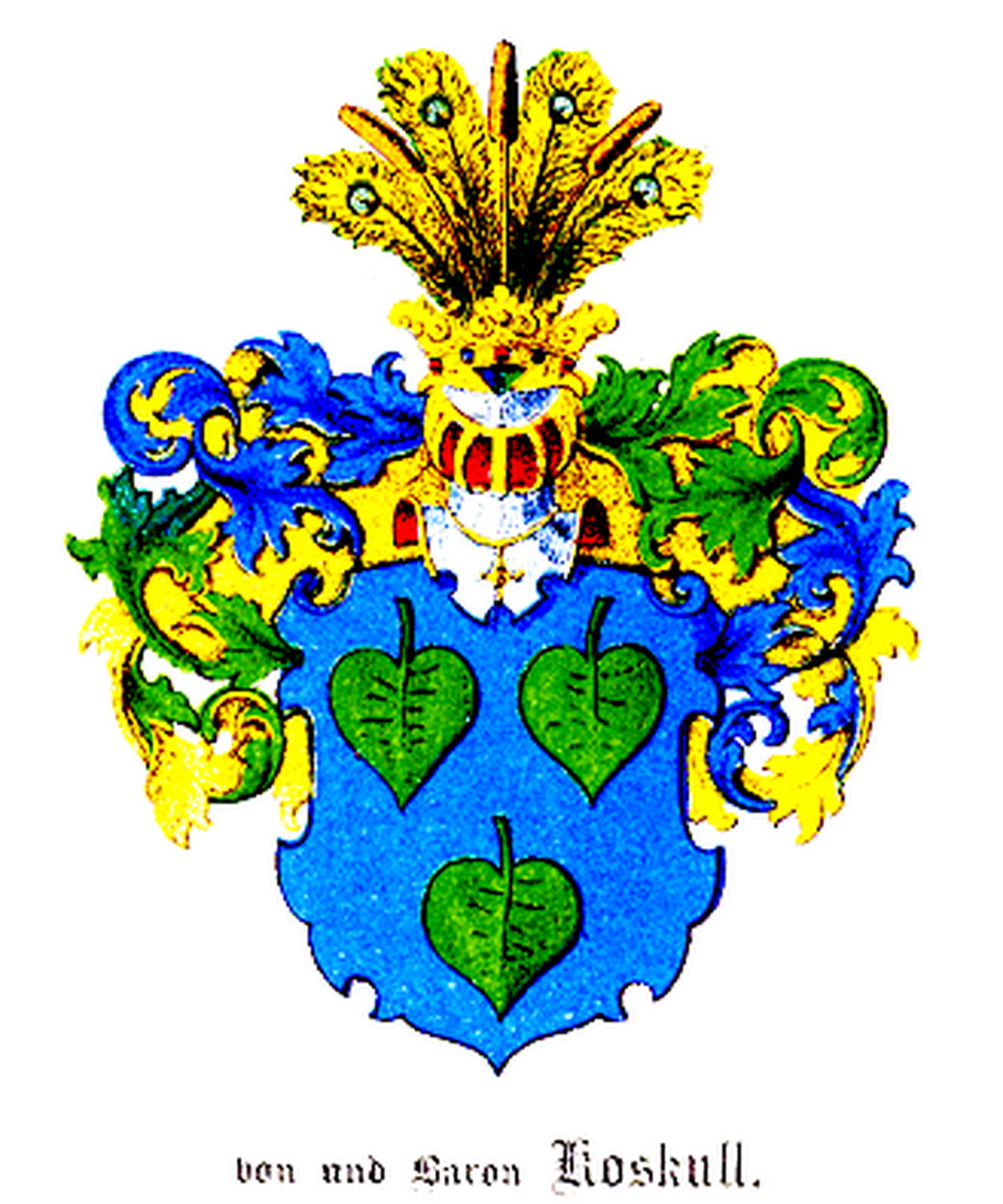
Swedish noble and baronial coat of arms

Coat of arms of Swedish branch Nr 248

Coat of arms of Swedish branch Nr 184

Coat of arms of Swedish branch Nr 160

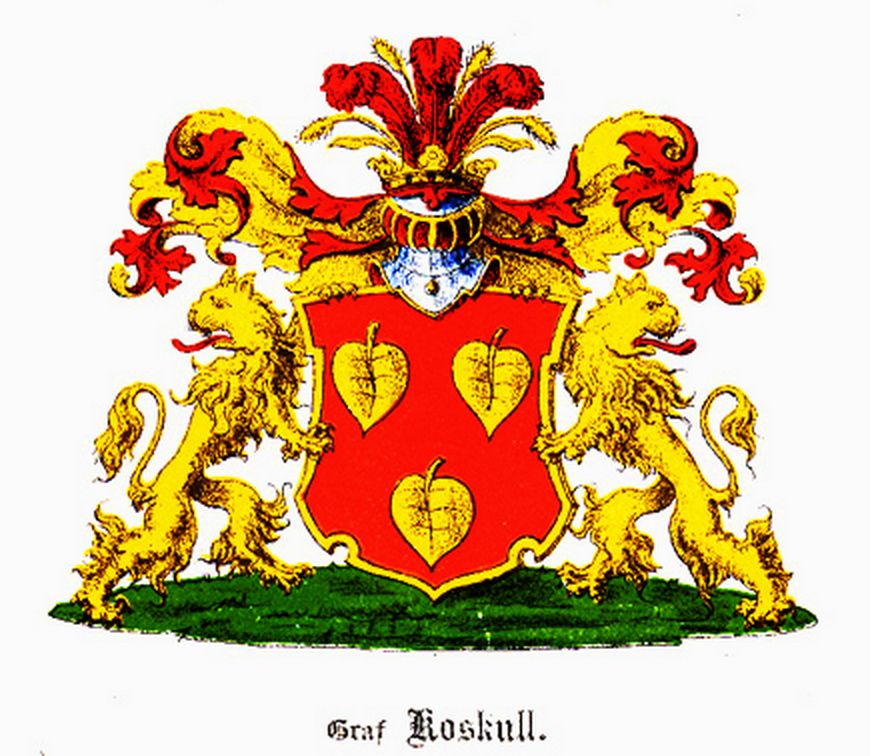
Russian Countly coat of arms

== Notable individuals ==
- Ernst von Koskull (1775–1856), Prussian lieutenant general
- Georg Adolf Koskull (1780–1829), governor of Norrbotten
- Peter Johann von Koskull (1786–1852), Russian lieutenant general
- Leonhard von Koschkull (1798–1872), Prussian lieutenant general
- Friedrich von Koskull (1830–1886), Russian mining engineer, geologist
- Anders Magnus Koskull (1831–1883), Member of Parliament
- Adam von Koskull (1800–1874), Courland state official
- Andreas von Koskull (1906–1992), German SS leader and war criminal
- Josepha von Koskull (1898–1996), German-Baltic writer and translator
- Casper Von Koskull (born 1960), Finnish-Swedish economist and business leader
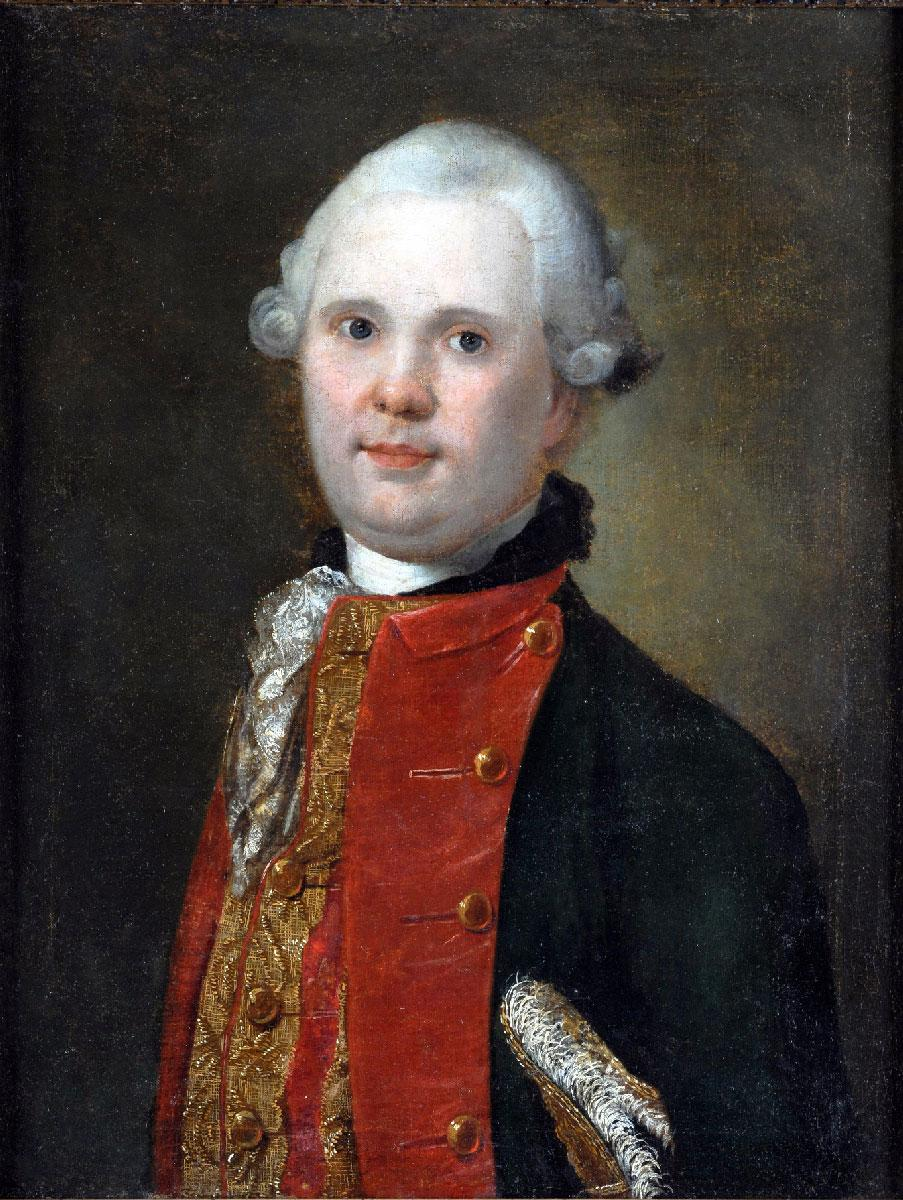
Karl Reinhold von Koskull (1731–1804), captain-lieutenant of the Russian Life Guard Regiment

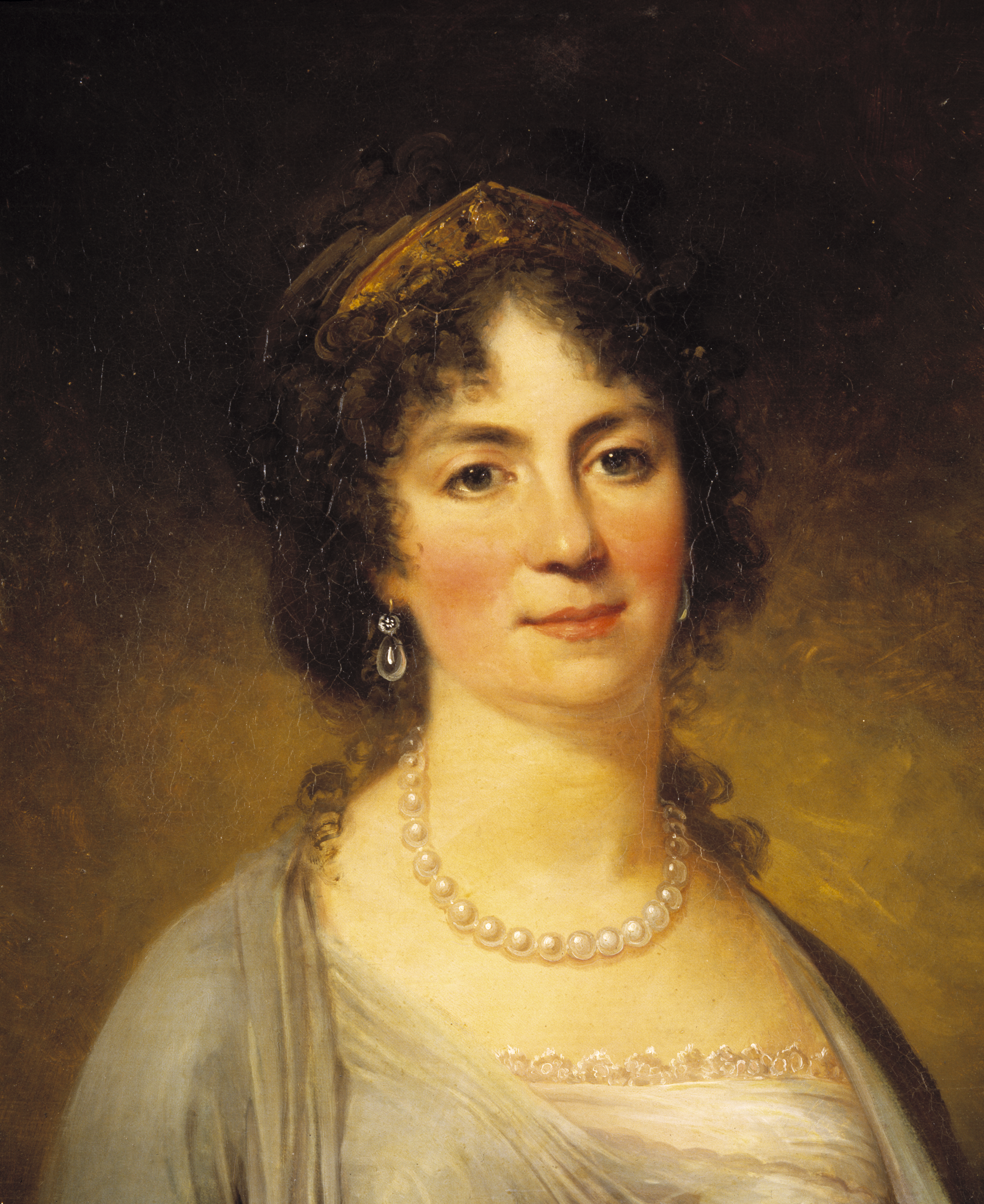
Ulrica Katharina Koskull (1759–1805), wife of Magnus Fredrik Brahe (1756-1826)

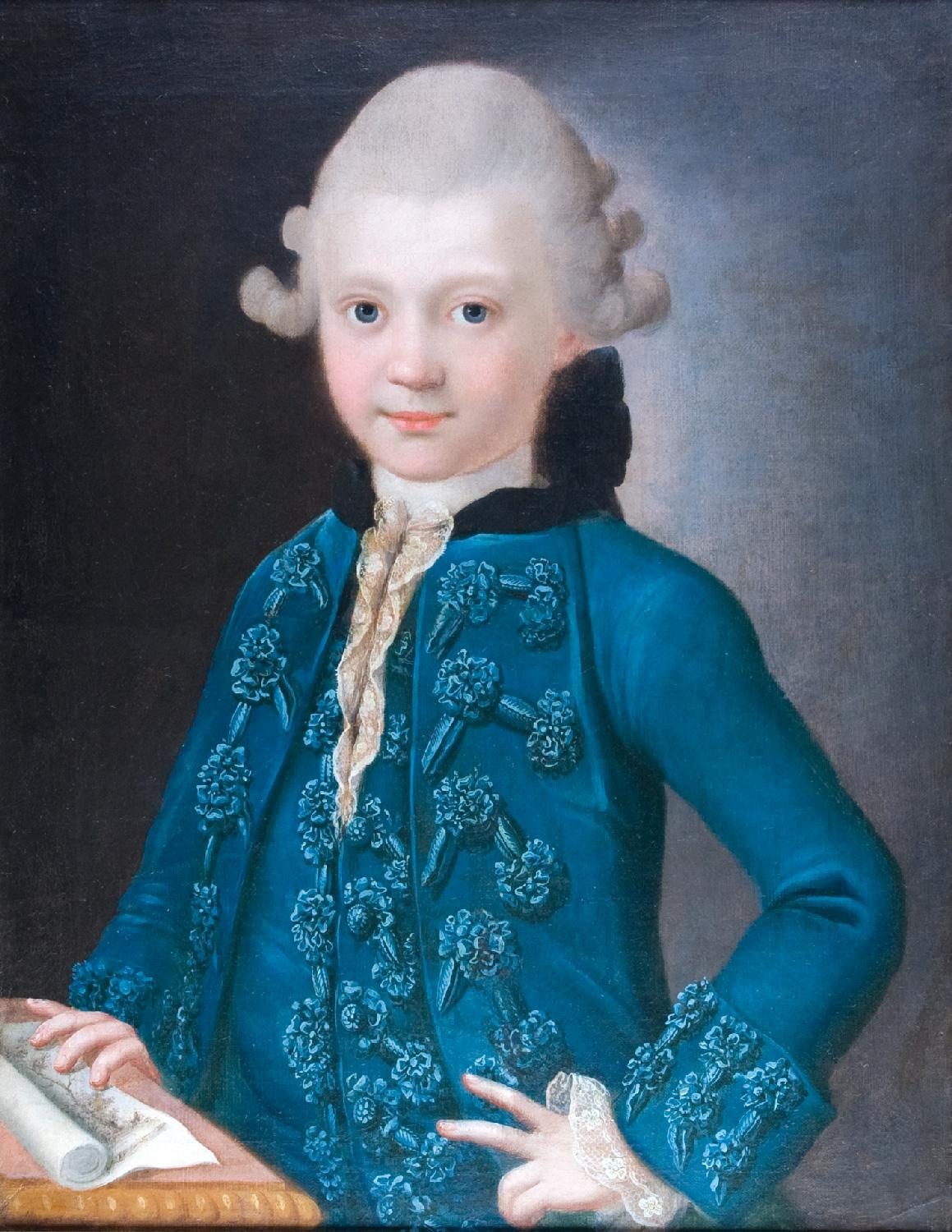
Peter August Friedrich von Koskull (1763–1827)

Aurora Wilhelmina Koskull (1778–1852), Swedish lady-in-waiting

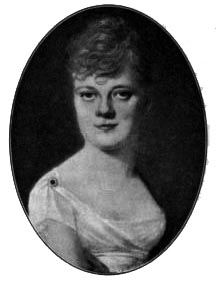
Mariana Koskull (1785–1841), Swedish lady-in-waiting, mistress of Charles XIII and Charles XIV

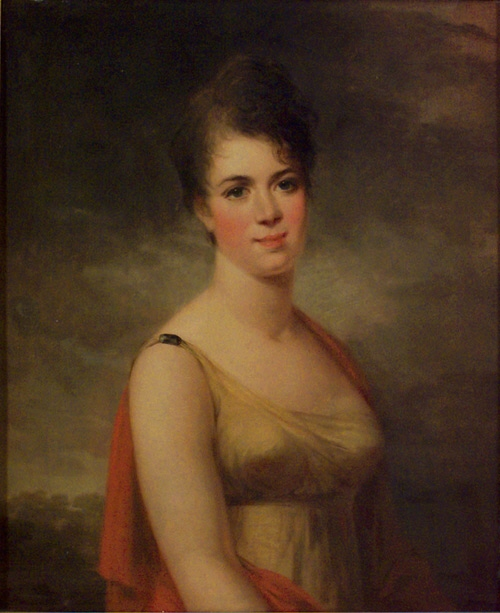
Constance Koskull (1788–1840)

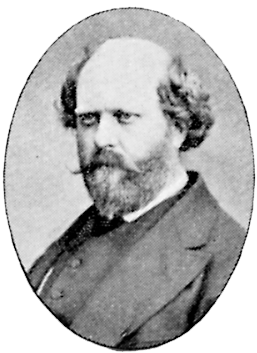
Anders Gustaf Koskull (1831–1904), painter of the Düsseldorf School

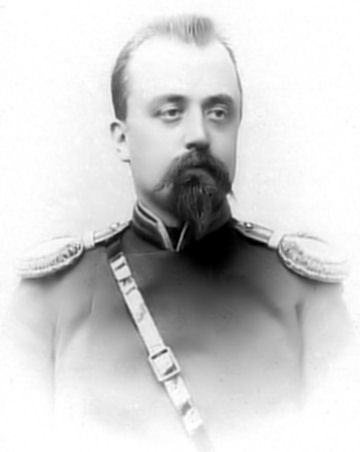
Wilhelm Georg Woldemar von Koskull (1864–1923)

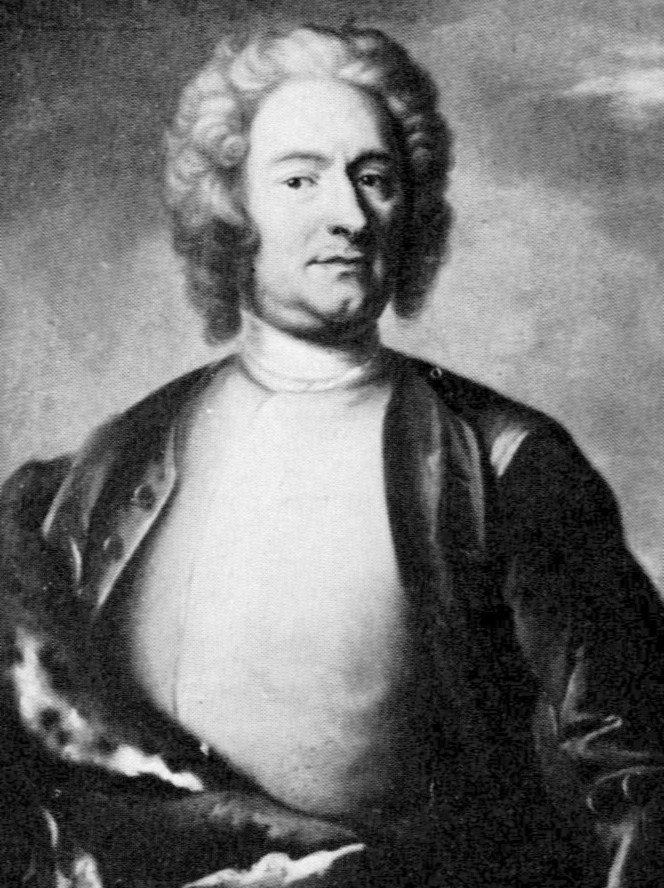
Anders Koskull (1677-1746), lieutenant general and governor, one of the founders of Kosta glassworks.

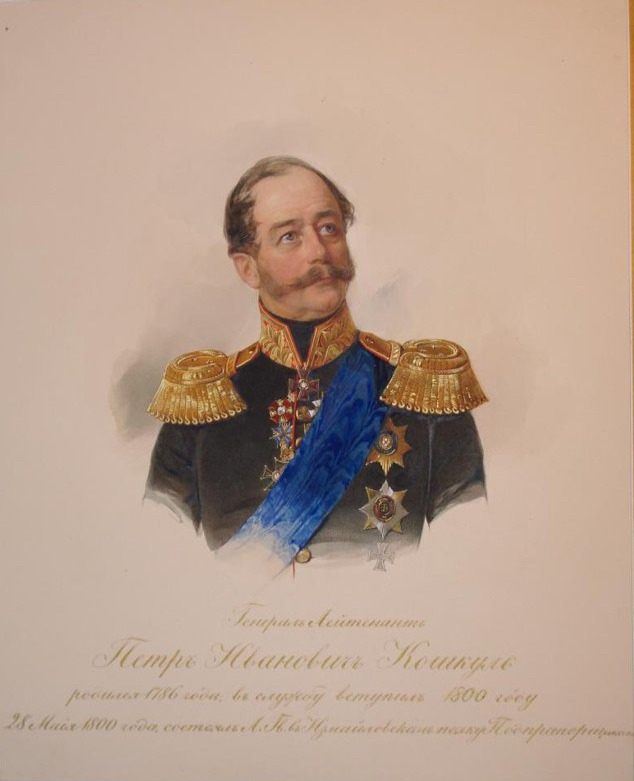
Peter Ivanovich Koskull (1786-1852), Lieutenant General in the Russian Empire.
