= Charles-Jean-Marie Alquier =

French diplomat

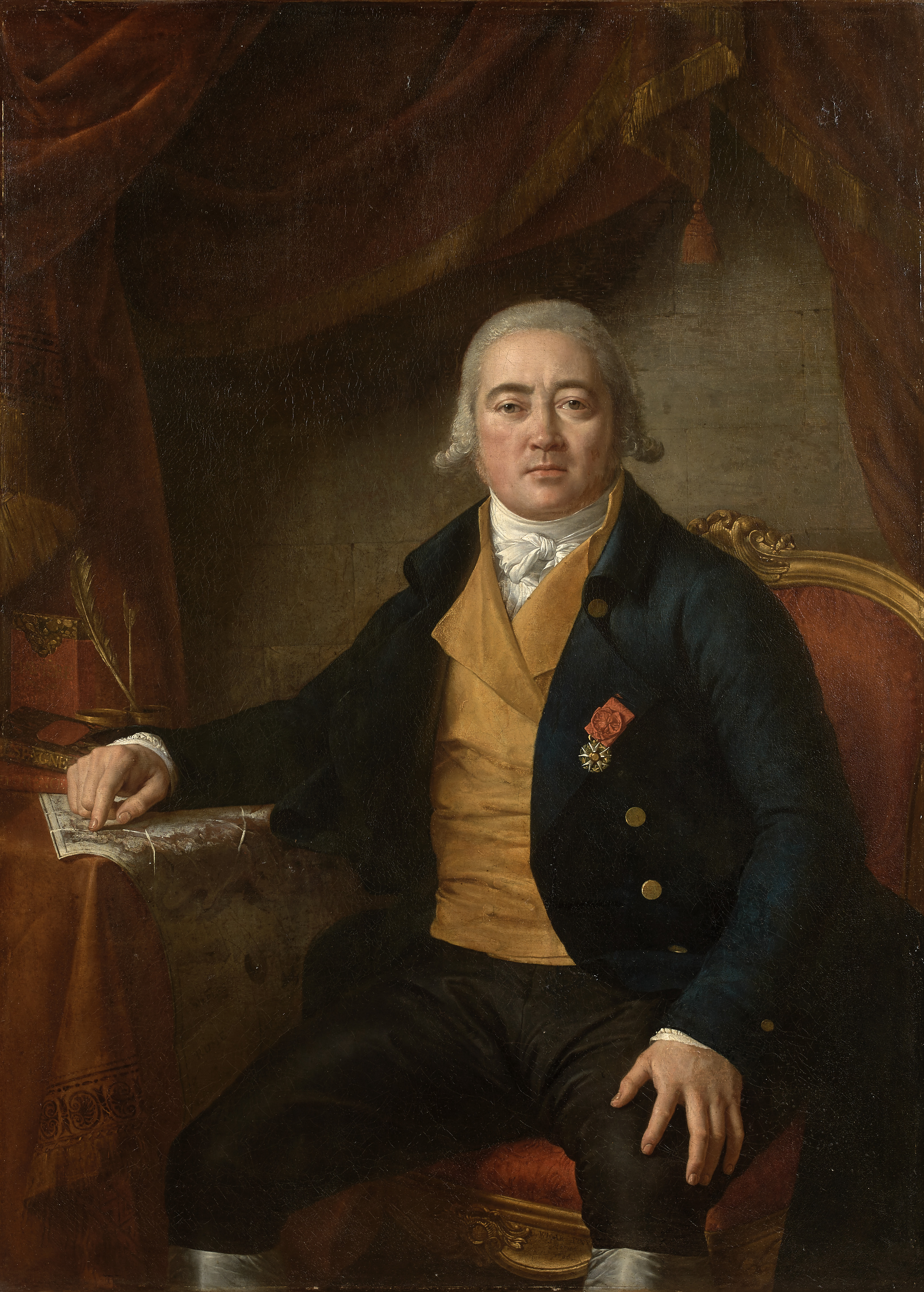

Minister in Copenhagen
- In office 1811–1814

Minister in Stockholm
- In office 1810–1811

Personal details
- Born: 13 October 1752
- Died: February 1826 (aged 73)
- Occupation: diplomat

Charles-Jean-Marie, baron Alquier (13 October 1752 – February 1826) was a French diplomat. He served as French minister (Ambassador) in several European capitals.

== Life ==
Alquier was born in the village of Talmont, near Les Sables d'Olonne, in the Province of Poitou (now Vendée). He was mayor of Rochelle in 1789, and was elected by the district of Aunis to the Estates-General. He was a member of the Constituent Assembly, and served on several committees; he became one of the secretaries of the Constituent Assembly. When the Assembly adjourned, he became President of the Criminal Tribunal of the Department of Seine et Oise, and was sent as their representative to the National Convention in 1792. In that Convention, he voted for the death of King Louis XVI. He assisted in the organization of Holland after its conquest by the French armies. In 1795 he was appointed Secretary to the Council of Ancients, one of the organs of the Constitution of the Year III under the Directorate.

He began his diplomatic career in 1798 with the appointment as Minister Plenipotentiary to Bavaria, where he served until March, 1799, at the approach of war. Back in France he was made Receiver-General of the Department of Seine et Oise, but on the overthrow of the Directory on the 18th of Brumaire, he returned to the diplomatic service on behalf of the new Consulate.

In March 1800, he was appointed by First Consul Bonaparte and Foreign Minister Talleyrand as Minister (Ambassador) in Madrid. When he was replaced in Madrid at the end of 1800 by Lucien Bonaparte, he was sent to Florence in February 1801, as Minister Plenipotentiary, to arrange peace with Naples. He conducted the negotiations which regularized the French conquest of Tuscany by its formal cession to France. He moved to the Court of Naples in March and became French Minister (Ambassador) there in April 1801. One of his notable achievements was the dismissal of Lord Acton, the Neapolitan prime minister, in 1804. When a combined British-Russian fleet and army entered the ports of the Kingdom, Alquier left Naples. At the end of 1805 he was transferred to Rome as a substitute for Cardinal Fesch, Napoleon's uncle, who had gone with Pope Pius VII to Paris. He returned to Paris in February, 1808.

In 1810–1811, he was sent to Stockholm as Envoy Extraordinary, and served as Minister (Ambassador) in Stockholm, and in 1811–1814 in Copenhagen. His mission was to enforce the "Continental System" of Napoleon against the British and Russian commercial interests. During his tenure in Stockholm, he tried to influence the Swedish Crown Prince through his French entourage, and the favorite of the Crown Princess, Elise la Flotte was apparently his most active agent among them along with Sevret: through La Flotte, d'Alquier tried to make Désirée affect her consort, when d'Alquier met her in the company of la Flotte.

In 1813, he concluded a defensive-offensive alliance with Denmark. With the fall of Napoleon Alquier was recalled, and with the return of the Monarchy under Louis XVIII, he was condemned to exile as a regicide. He was allowed to return to France in 1818, with the consent of the King. He died in Paris on February 4, 1826.
