= Aurora Wilhelmina Brahe =

Swedish lady-in-waiting and salonist (1778–1852)

Aurora Vilhelmina Koskull in 1830

Aurora Wilhelmina Brahe (née Koskull; 22 November 1778 – 19 February 1852) was a Swedish lady-in-waiting and politically active salonist.

== Life ==
Aurora Wilhelmina Koskull was the daughter of the courtier Baron Otto Anders Koskull and Amalia Beata Silfversparre.

=== Court service ===
In 1797, Koskull became one of the first hovfröken (maid-of-honor) appointed to the new queen, Frederica of Baden. In 1800, the queen's maids-of-honor were dismissed by the king because of many scandals involving their love affairs, and replaced with statsfru (married ladies-in-waiting). Impoverished, Koskull moved in with her aunt, Ulrika Katarina Koskull, and her aunt's wealthy husband, Count Magnus Fredrik Brahe (1756-1826).

The queen's former maids-of-honor were all compensated with the formal position as maids-of-honor to the household of the infant crown prince, while he was still small enough to have female courtiers, and as such she still had the right to attend court, and often participated in high society life. In 1802, Koskull is noted as an accomplished singer in the performances staged by the amateur theatre society of Princess Charlotte at Rosersberg Palace.

During the visit of Prince William Frederick in Stockholm during the winter of 1802–03, there were rumours of an affair between them, which was mentioned in the diary of Princess Charlotte:

"Aurora Koskull, maid-of-honor to the queen and in service to the royal children, had made a great impression upon the prince and made him lose his head entirely. She is truly very beautiful, and while not particularly intelligent she has accomplishments which could well replace wit and a good head. He confided this tender affection to me. He has a heart of gold and a mild temperament, which is why it would never occur to him to spoil the reputation of a young girl or harm her future prospects. I talked some sense to him, made him the most earnest objections, but to no avail, his love was too great, he only replied 'Oh, if she was your daughter! I would ask for nothing better than to ask you for her hand. You are of course perfectly correct in everything you say, but what am I to do? I love her to distraction!' Personally I am convinced that the young couple acted correctly, but all of Stockholm gossipped that the prince did not sigh in vain."

Being without a dowry, it was difficult for Koskull to marry. In 1806, half a year after the death of her aunt, she married her aunt's rich widower, Count Brahe. She had two children, Ulrika Vilhelmina Brahe (1808–1836) and Magnus Brahe (1810–).

=== Reign of Charles XIII ===
In 1811, her spouse was appointed Swedish minister to France, and she accompanied him to Paris. In France, she attracted the attention of Napoleon, who called her la belle suédoise ("the beautiful Swede").

During the reign of Charles XIII and Charles XIV John she had a powerful position, being related to the influential royal mistress Mariana Koskull as well as being the stepmother of the royal favorite and politician Magnus Brahe, who felt great affection for her, and reportedly asked her for advice in matters of state.

In 1810, she attracted the attention of the elected Crown Prince Jean-Baptiste Bernadotte, the future Charles XIV John of Sweden, who was reportedly in love with her and courted her. There were rumours of an affair between them, but these are not regarded to be true, and instead Charles John was reportedly rejected by her and instead entered in to a relationship with her relative, Mariana Koskull. In June 1815, the matter was mentioned in the famous journal of queen Charlotte:

"Still another thing would add to the reasons as to why the crown prince does not wish the crown princess to return. It is gossiped about that he entertain an affair with one of my ladies-in-waiting, miss Koskull, a commitment which he attempted to conceal with the utmost discretion but which has been exposed by the behaviour of the young lady herself. She asks for nothing better than for everyone to believe that the rumour is true. It is possible that the crown prince is amused by her and finds her pleasant, but he is really an admirer of Koskull's cousin countess Brahe. In that case not even the most ill willed tongue could find something poisonous to say, for in that matter everything is conducted in the most suitable and blameless manner."

Not soon after, there was a rumour that Brahe had supplanted her cousin Koskull as the lover of the crown prince:

"To distract himself from his troubles, caused by the situation in France, the crown prince, now when we have been having such lovely weather, has arranged intimate outdoor suppers with a selected company of young ladies and some gentlemen of his own age. It has been noted by the public how the crown prince gives his attention to countess Brahe before anyone else and that miss Koskull has not participated in those picnics, and it was erroneously believed, that he had changed his preference. But the always sensible, dignified and correct behaviour of the countess should spare her from such suspicions. I am convinced, that he only has a friendship for her inspired by the warm affection he holds for her husband. It would however be quite natural if he is enchanted by her beauty and therefore gives her his tribute. For my part I am sure, that the cousin of the countess miss Koskull is his mistress and that his feelings for the countess are entirely platonic."

In June 1817, queen Charlotte summarized the difference of the crown prince's relationship toward the two cousins, while also giving Brahe a personal description:

"The crown prince are in no way indifferent for the fair sex in general but has particular affection for two ladies of society, two cousins. For the first, countess Brahe, he has the warmest friendship and affection, and he is also viewed by the countess as a dear friend. As a true gentleman in every sense of the word he gives the countess the tribute worthy of her beauty and noble character. She is not a wit, has barely been given an accomplished or cultivated education but has acquired some learning, are particularly noted for her tact and refined manner and are commonly loved."

=== Reign of Charles XIV John ===
In 1823, she was offered the position of head lady-in-waiting to the new crown princess, Josephine of Leuchtenberg, upon her arrival to Sweden, being at that time one of the leading women of court life and high society; she refused and the office was instead given to Elisabet Charlotta Piper, but she did accept to have the position temporary, by meeting Josephine in Germany and escorting her the last part of the journey to Sweden:

"There had been eager hopes that countess Brahe would accept the office as senior lady-in-waiting at the new court, but she could not be enticed to. She did agree to accept the task to depart for Lubeck and receive the crown princess, whose German ladies were both to depart from her there. To the post of senior lady-in-waiting was instead appointed countess Erik Piper, a lady in every aspect worthy of her office, which neither she accepted without difficulty. As she by birth and wealth had come to be in an independent as well as pleasurable position, it may have been a sacrifice which was not entirely compensated by the award the titles and honors could offer vanity."

Brahe was a leading figure of the aristocratic life of Stockholm, a position she kept after having been a widowed in 1826. She had a very good relationship to her stepson Magnus Brahe, who discussed state affairs with her and asked her for political advice. It was said that she "took the lead in the most notable salon of the Swedish aristocracy with noble dignity" and her salon was described as "a school, where youth took their knowledge in the art of good mannered socializing"; also in her old age, she was said to keep a "beautiful and majestic appearance".
