= Carl Abraham Arfwedson =

Swedish silk merchant, director and artist

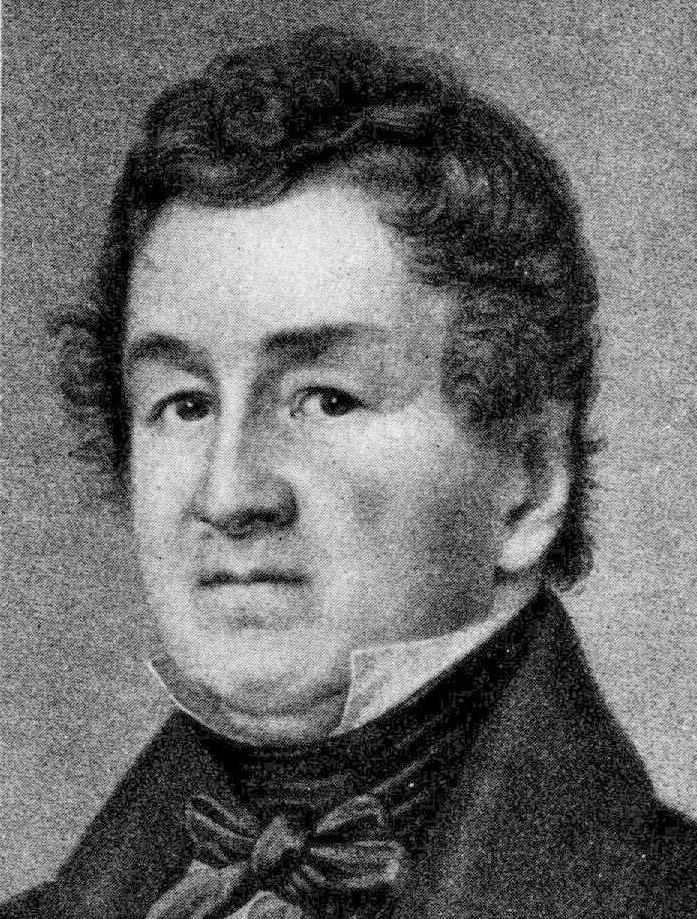
Carl Arfwedson

Carl Abraham Arfwedson (1774–1861) was a Swedish silk merchant, director and etching artist.

== Biography ==
Carl Abraham Arfwedson was born to the rich trade merchant Carl Kristoffer Arfwedson (1735–1826) and Charlotta von Langenberg. He was the brother of Charlotta Arfwedson (1776–1862). His brother-in-law, Carl Carlsson Mörner (1755–1821) served as Governor-general of Norway.

He was raised to take over the successful trading company Tottie & Arfwedson of his father and grandfather, and made several study trips abroad. One of them was made to the French firm Clary in Marseille, where he spent some time employed in the company of Clary, whose daughter Désirée Clary was eventually to be the queen consort of Sweden. He returned to Sweden permanently in 1808 and took over the company as director upon the death of his father in 1826. He was elected to serve as director of the Swedish East India Company for a period. During the 1810s, he owned the villa Listonhill in Stockholm, which was for a period a center of the burgher upper class society life in the capital.

Carl Abraham Arfwedson is also known for his etchings. In 1787, he became a student of Jacob Gillberg (1724–1793) at the Royal Swedish Academy of Fine Arts. Some of his work is kept at the Gothenborg Art Museum (Göteborgs Konsthall).

After Désirée's niece Marcelle Tascher de la Pagerie (1792–1866) left Sweden, the queen reportedly felt lonely and isolated. She then began to spend more time with Carl Abraham Arfwedson, who had lived in her home during her upbringing and with whom she liked to talk with of France, a friendship which caused rumors that they once had a romance.
