= Charlotta Arfwedson =

Swedish artist (1776–1862)

Charlotta Arfwedson (5 August 1776 - 8 September 1862) was a Swedish countess and artist. She was politically active and acted as adviser of her second spouse, nobleman Carl Carlsson Mörner (1755–1821). She was a member of the Royal Swedish Academy of Arts (1793).

== Biography ==
Charlotta Arfwedson was the daughter of the merchant Carl Kristoffer Arfwedson and Katarina Charlotta von Langenberg. Her brother, merchant Carl Abraham Arfwedson (1774-1861), was a personal friend of the Swedish queen, Désirée Clary. He had come to know her while he was employed in her father's firm in Marseille and used to speak with her about memories of France.

Charlotta Arfwedson first married Colonel Lieutenant Baron Casper Wrede, whom she later divorced. In 1810, she married politician Count Carl Mörner, who served as Governor-general of Norway. She was well known by her contemporaries to act as the political adviser of her spouse. He followed her advice, she wrote and edited his speeches and handled his correspondence with the French-born heir to the throne, Charles XIV John of Sweden, who could not speak Swedish. Mörner could not speak French, while she could speak both languages. Queen Charlotte wrote of her influence in her famous journal: "She does influence his decisions to a large degree, and the acknowledgement must be made to her, that she does so excellently skillful and almost without anyone noticing it."

== Other sources ==
- Ivar Simonsson. Carl Christopher Arfwedson Svenskt biografiskt lexikon, Retrieved 2015-02-07
- Cecilia af Klercker (1942). Hedvig Elisabeth Charlottas dagbok IX (1812–1817). Stockholm: Norstedt & Söners förlag. p. 495
- Eva-Lena Bengtsson, intendent: Konstakademiens ledamöter. Från 1700-talet till 2011
