= Autheuil =

Autheuil is the name or part of the name of the following communes in France:

- Autheuil, Eure-et-Loir, in the Eure-et-Loir department
- Autheuil, Orne, in the Orne department
- Autheuil-Authouillet, in the Eure department
- Autheuil-en-Valois, in the Oise department

== See also ==
- Auteuil (disambiguation)
