= Magnus Brahe (1790–1844) =

Swedish statesman, soldier and general (1790–1844)

His Excellency The High Well-born Count Magnus Brahe Lord of the Realm RoKavKMO
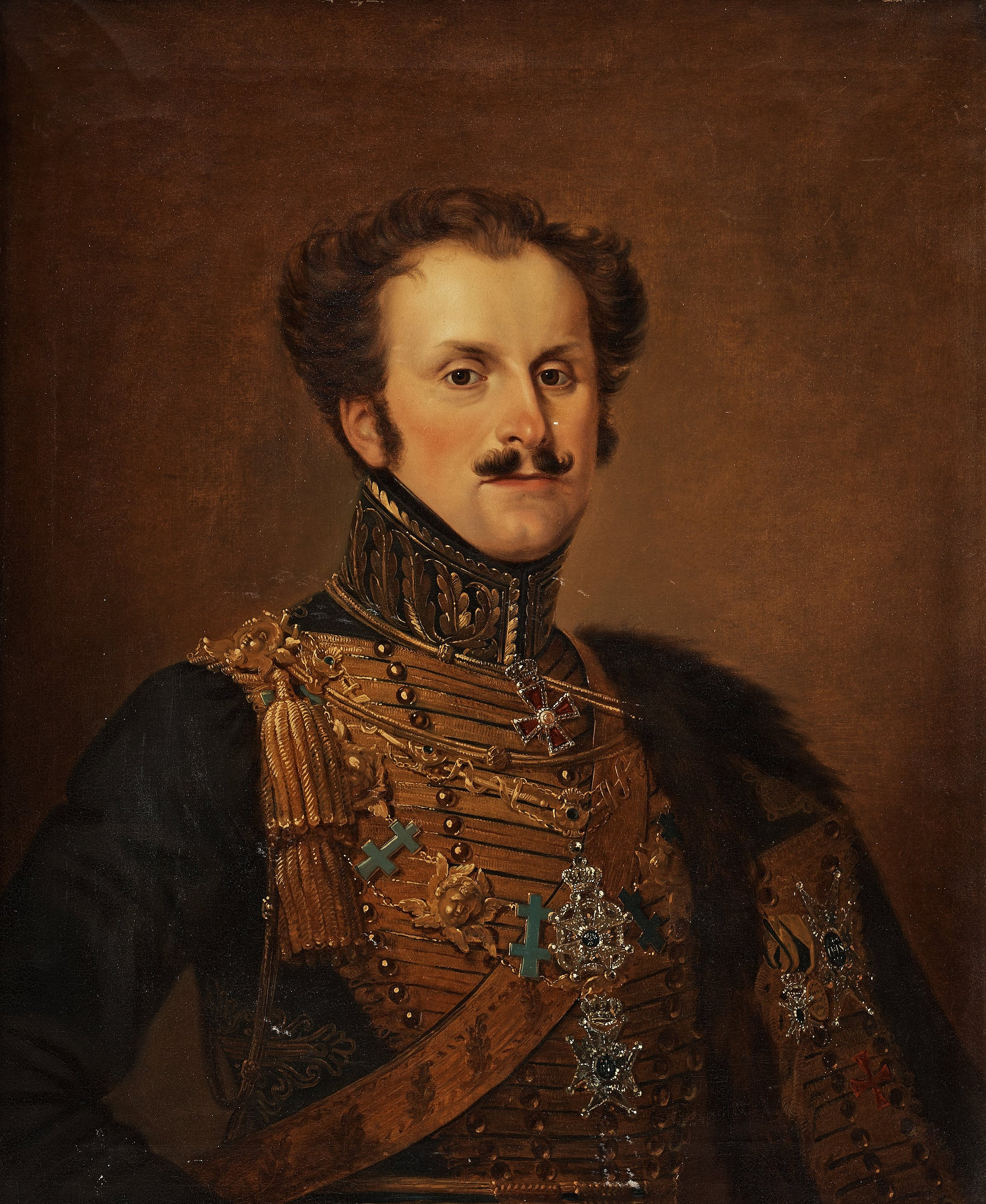
- Portrait by Olof Johan Södermark, 1831.

Marshal of the Realm of Sweden
- In office 1831–1844
- Monarch: Charles XIV John
- Preceded by: Claes Adolph Fleming
- Succeeded by: Arvid Mauritz Posse

Master of the Horse of Sweden
- In office 1826–1826
- Monarch: Charles XIV John
- Preceded by: Claes Rålamb
- Succeeded by: unknown

Personal details
- Born: 2 September 1790 Östra Ryd Parish, Kingdom of Sweden
- Died: 16 September 1844 (aged 54) Stockholm, Kingdom of Sweden
- Resting place: Family tomb at the Östra Ryd Church, Uppland
- Parent(s): Magnus Fredrik Brahe; Ulrika Catharina Koskull
- Relatives: Brahe family
- Education: Uppsala University

Nils Magnus Brahe (2 September 1790 – 16 September 1844) was a Swedish statesman and military officer during the War of the Sixth Coalition. He served as the Marshal of the Realm between 1831–1844 and was known as the influential favourite of Charles XIV John, King of Sweden.

== Biography ==
=== Early life ===
Nils Magnus Brahe was born on 2 September 1790 to Count Magnus Fredrik Brahe (1756–1826) and his first wife Baroness Ulrika Katarina Koskull (1759–1805), thus making him a member of the Swedish branch of the Brahe family. He is a direct descendant of Per Brahe the Younger, Lord High Steward and Governor-General. After studying at Uppsala University, he pursued a professional military career as cornet at the Royal Life Regiment Brigade's Light Dragoons Corps at 19 years of age. Early as 1810, he became Cabinet Chamberlain and had close relations with Charles XIV John during his early reign.

=== The King's favourite ===
Not long thereafter, Brahe became one of the King's closest friends. He assisted Charles XIV John's correspondence with officials and servants. He fought in the War against Napoleon (1813–1814) under Jean Bernadotte who later ascended to the throne as Charles XIV John of Sweden (Swedish: Karl XIV Johan). He was in high favour with the French born king who had a poor command of the Swedish language. He became Marshal of the Realm, and especially from 1828 onwards, exercised an influence in public affairs. As a politician, he reportedly remained close to his stepmother, Countess Aurora Wilhelmina Koskull, who was active within Stockholm aristocratic circles and also related to the king's mistress Mariana Koskull. In 1837, he was elected a member of the Royal Swedish Academy of Sciences.
