= Élise la Flotte =

Marie-Anne Elisabeth "Elise" la Flotte, or de Flotte, née Reboul (1779 in Smyrna – 25 March 1815 in Paris), was a French lady's companion, lady-in-waiting of the French Crown Princess of Sweden Désirée Clary, consort of Jean Baptiste Bernadotte.

Elise la Flotte was born to the French merchant Louis-Auguste Reboul (1743-1834) and his Dutch wife Catherine Van Sanen (1754-1835) in Smyrna. She returned with her parents to France in 1787, and was educated in a convent school for girls in Marseilles and the school comrade of Désirée Clary. In 1795 she married Paul-Fulcrand de Flotte (1770-1800), an officer of the French navy. After having become widowed, she was employed as a companion of her former school comrade, Désirée Clary. In January 1811, she accompanied Désirée to Sweden, were the latter's spouse had been elected heir to the throne. She was the only French courtier Désirée brought with her to Sweden.

Elise la Flotte has been blamed for the bad impression Désirée made during her stay in Sweden as Crown Princess. Reportedly, la Flotte encouraged Désirée constant complaints about everything non-French, and amused her caricaturing the court and surroundings, which was reported and disliked. Robert von Rosen called her "la flotte ennemie" ('Enemy Fleet').

The Crown Prince tried to force his consort to send la Flotte away, but she refused to do so. According to Queen Hedvig Elizabeth Charlotte, Elise la Flotte was also to blame for the harassment the Swedish head lady-in-waiting Countess Caroline Lewenhaupt was exposed to by the Crown Princess, because she wanted her position. Finally, the Crown Prince asked the King to appoint la Flotte the deputy of Lewenhaupt and second chief lady-in-waiting, which was done. Élise la Flotte had an affair with Gustaf Löwenhielm, who was then referred to as "l'amiral de la Flotte".

During this period, the French minister in Stockholm, Charles Jean Marie d'Alquier, tried to influence the Crown Prince through his French entourage, and la Flotte was apparently his most active agent among them along with Sevret. d'Alquier also tried to make Désirée affect her consort, when d'Alquier met her with la Flotte. Finally, Elise La Flotte was blamed for the fact that Désirée returned to France in June 1811: in 1816, Désirée's son stated that his mother had stayed away so long mostly because of Elise la Flotte, and that he hoped that she would now return after the death of la Flotte.

She is portrayed in the famous novel Desirée (1952) by Annemarie Selinko.
