= Carl Carlsson Mörner =

Swedish nobleman, officer and politician (1755–1821)

His Excellency The High Well-born Count Carl Carlsson Mörner
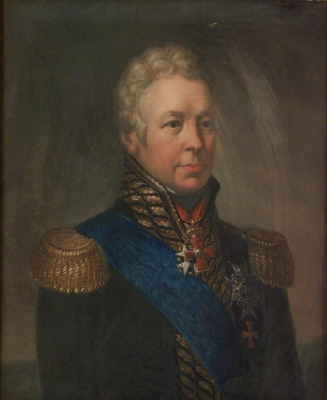

Governor-general of Norway
- In office 1816–1818

Count of Tuna
- In office 1800–1821

Personal details
- Born: 1 December 1755 Jönköping
- Died: 24 June 1821 (aged 65) Stockholm
- Spouse: Charlotta Arfwedson

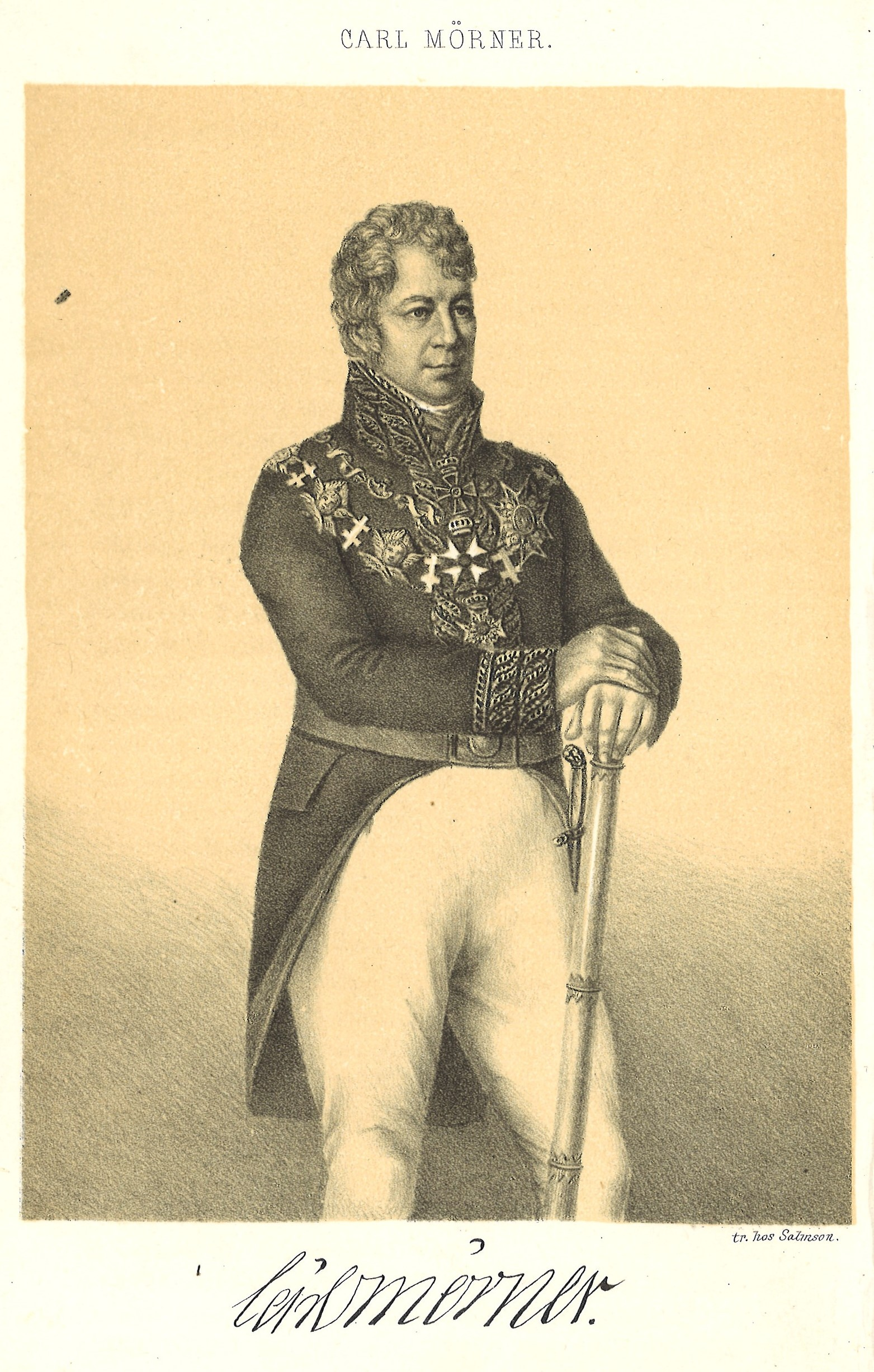
Carl Mörner af Tuna

Carl Carlsson Mörner (1 December 1755 in Jönköping – 24 June 1821 in Stockholm) was a Swedish nobleman, officer, and politician. After rising through the ranks after being accepted as a cadet in 1771, he was made field marshal in 1816, and served as Governor-general of Norway from 1816 to 1818. He was made count of Tuna in 1800. He was married to Charlotta Arfwedson, was commonly known to be his political adviser.

Preceded by Hans Henrik von Essen	Governor-general of Norway; 1816–1818	Succeeded by Johan August Sandels
