= Auteuil =

Auteuil may refer to:

== Places ==
- Auteuil, Oise, a commune in France
- Auteuil, Paris, a neighborhood of Paris
  - Auteuil, Seine, the former commune which was on the outskirts of Paris
- Auteuil, Quebec, a former city that is now a district within Laval, Quebec, Canada
- Auteuil, Yvelines, a commune in France

== People ==
- Aurore Auteuil (born 1981), French actress
- Daniel Auteuil (born 1950), French actor

== Paris Metro stations ==
- Église d'Auteuil station
- Michel-Ange–Auteuil station
- Porte d'Auteuil station

== Other ==
- Auteuil Hippodrome, a horse racing venue in Paris

== See also ==
- Autheuil (disambiguation)
