= Frankelin =

Swedish noble family

Frankelin was a Swedish noble family of English origin. It descends from an Englishman, Rowland Franklin, whose son Henrik Frankelin went to Sweden and became valet de chambre of Duke Charles, the later Charles IX of Sweden. Frankelin married an illegitimate daughter Constantia Eriksdotter of Eric XIV of Sweden and Agda Persdotter. Their sons were naturalised into Swedish nobility in 1625. The elder son Carl Frankelin had only one child, Constantia (1631-1681), who was the last member of the family.
