= Désirée Clary =

Queen of Sweden and Norway from 1818 to 1844

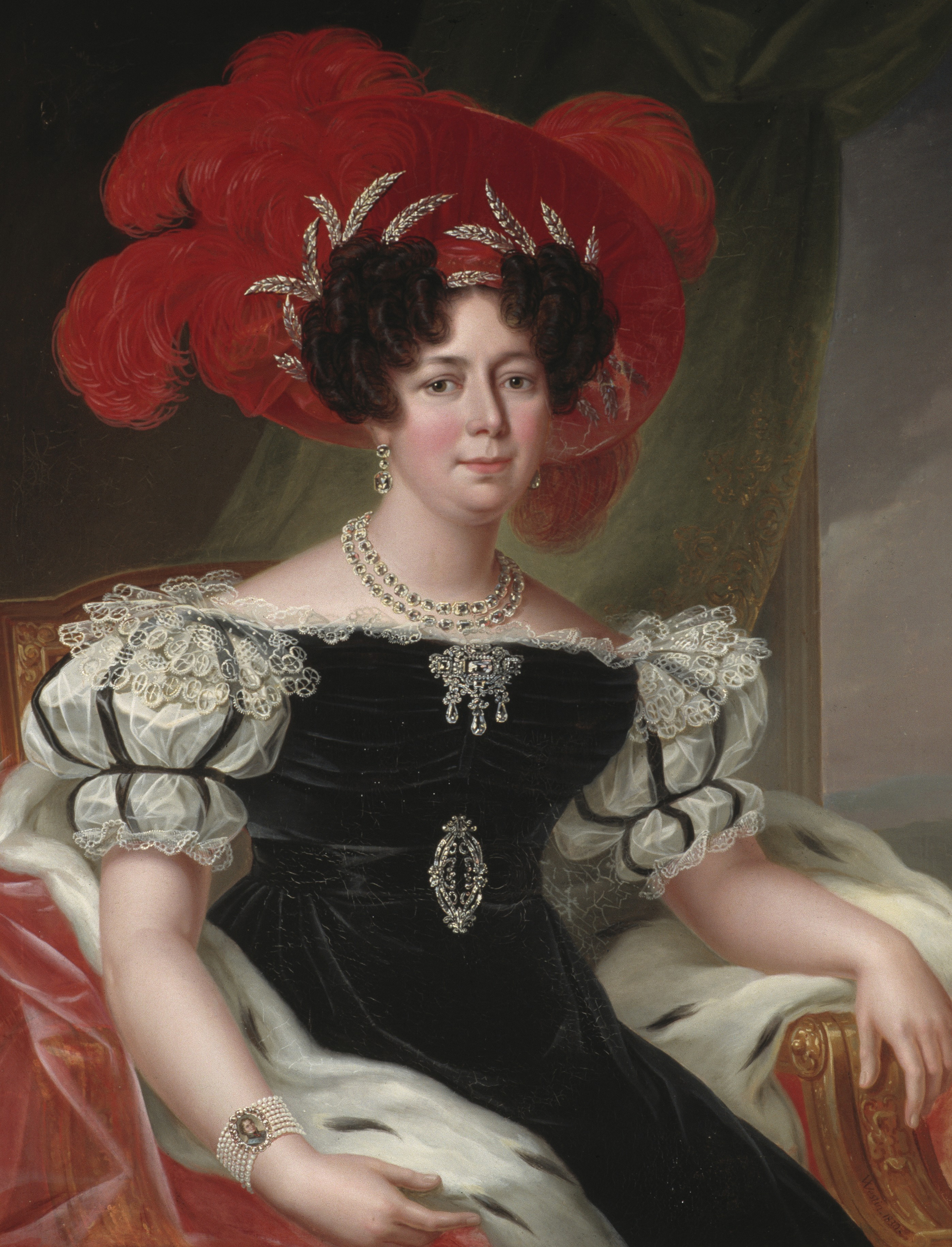
- Portrait, 1830

Queen consort of Sweden and Norway
- Tenure: 5 February 1818 – 8 March 1844
- Coronation: 21 August 1829
- Born: Bernardine Eugénie Désirée Clary; 8 November 1777; Marseille, France
- Died: 17 December 1860 (aged 83); Stockholm Palace, Sweden
- Burial: 11 January 1861; Riddarholm Church
- Spouse: Charles XIV John (m. 1798; died 1844)
- Issue: Oscar I of Sweden
- House: Bernadotte (by marriage)
- Father: François Clary
- Mother: Françoise Rose Somis

Bernardine Eugénie Désirée Clary (Swedish: Eugenia Bernhardina Desideria; 8 November 1777 – 17 December 1860) was Queen of Sweden and Norway from 5 February 1818 to 8 March 1844 as the wife of King Charles XIV John. Charles John was a French general and founder of the House of Bernadotte. Désirée Clary, the mother of Oscar I, was the one-time fiancée of Napoleon Bonaparte. She was also the sister of Julie Clary, the queen consort of Spain and Naples. Her name was officially changed in Sweden to Desideria although she did not use that name.

== Background and education ==
Désirée Clary was born in Marseille, France, the daughter of François Clary (Marseille, St. Ferreol, 24 February 1725 – Marseille, 20 January 1794), a wealthy French silk manufacturer and merchant, by his second wife (m. 26 June 1759) Françoise Rose Somis (Marseille, St. Ferreol, 30 August 1737 – Paris, 28 January 1815). Eugénie was normally used as her name of address. Her father had been previously married, at Marseille on 13 April 1751, to Gabrielle Fléchon (1732 – 3 May 1758).

Clary had a sister and brother to whom she remained very close all her life. Her sister, Julie Clary, married Joseph Bonaparte; she later became Queen of Naples and Spain. Her brother, Nicolas Joseph Clary, was created Count Clary. He married Anne Jeanne Rouyer, by whom he had a daughter named Zénaïde Françoise Clary (Paris, 25 November 1812 – Paris, 27 April 1884). Zénaïde would marry Napoléon Alexandre Berthier (the son of Marshal Louis Alexandre Berthier) and have several children, among them the first wife of Joachim, 4th Prince Murat.

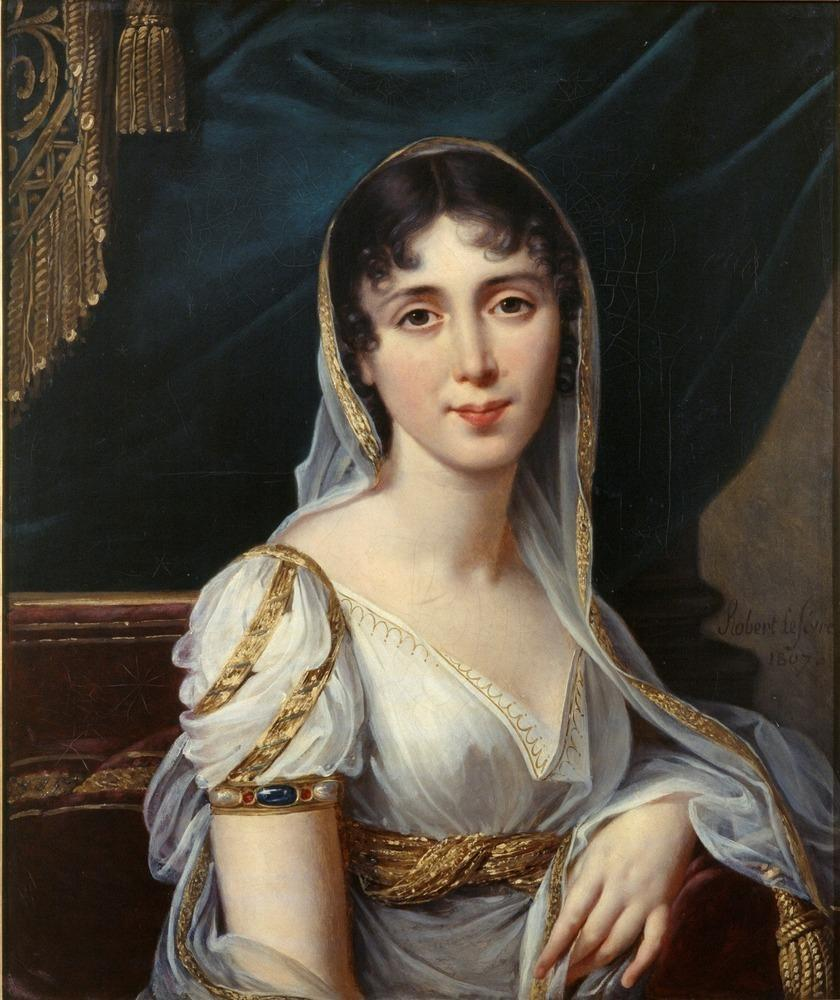
An early portrait by Robert Lefèvre

As a child, Clary received the convent schooling usually given to daughters of the upper classes in pre-revolutionary France. However, when she was barely 11 years old, the French Revolution (starting in 1789) took place, during which convents were closed. Clary returned to live with her parents, where she was perforce home-schooled thereafter. Later, her education was described as shallow. It has been observed by several historians that Clary was devoted to her birth-family her entire life.

== Meeting the Bonapartes ==
In 1794, Clary's father died. Shortly after, it was discovered that in the years before the revolution, he had made an appeal to be ennobled, a request that had been denied. Because of this, Désirée Clary's brother Etienne, now the head of the family and her guardian, was arrested. Désirée Clary went to talk on his behalf and seek his release from the holding. In the process, she met Joseph Bonaparte, inviting him back to their home. Joseph was soon engaged to her elder sister Julie, while Napoleon was engaged to Désirée Clary on 21 April 1795. In 1795–1797, Clary lived with her mother in Genoa in Italy, where her brother-in-law Joseph had a diplomatic mission; they were also joined by the Bonaparte family. In 1795, Napoleon became involved with Joséphine de Beauharnais and broke the engagement to Clary on 6 September. He married Joséphine in 1796.

In 1797, Clary went to live in Rome with her sister Julie and her brother-in-law Joseph, who was French ambassador to the Papal States. Her relationship with Julie remained close. She was briefly engaged to Mathurin-Léonard Duphot, a French general. The engagement has been assumed to be Napoleon's idea to compensate her with a marriage, while Duphot was attracted to her dowry and position as sister-in-law of Napoleon. She agreed to the engagement though Duphot had a long-term relationship and a son with another woman. On 30 December 1797, on the eve of their marriage, Duphot was killed in an anti-French riot outside of their residence Palazzo Corsini in Rome. In later years, Clary vehemently denied that her engagement to Duphot had ever existed.

== Madame Bernadotte ==
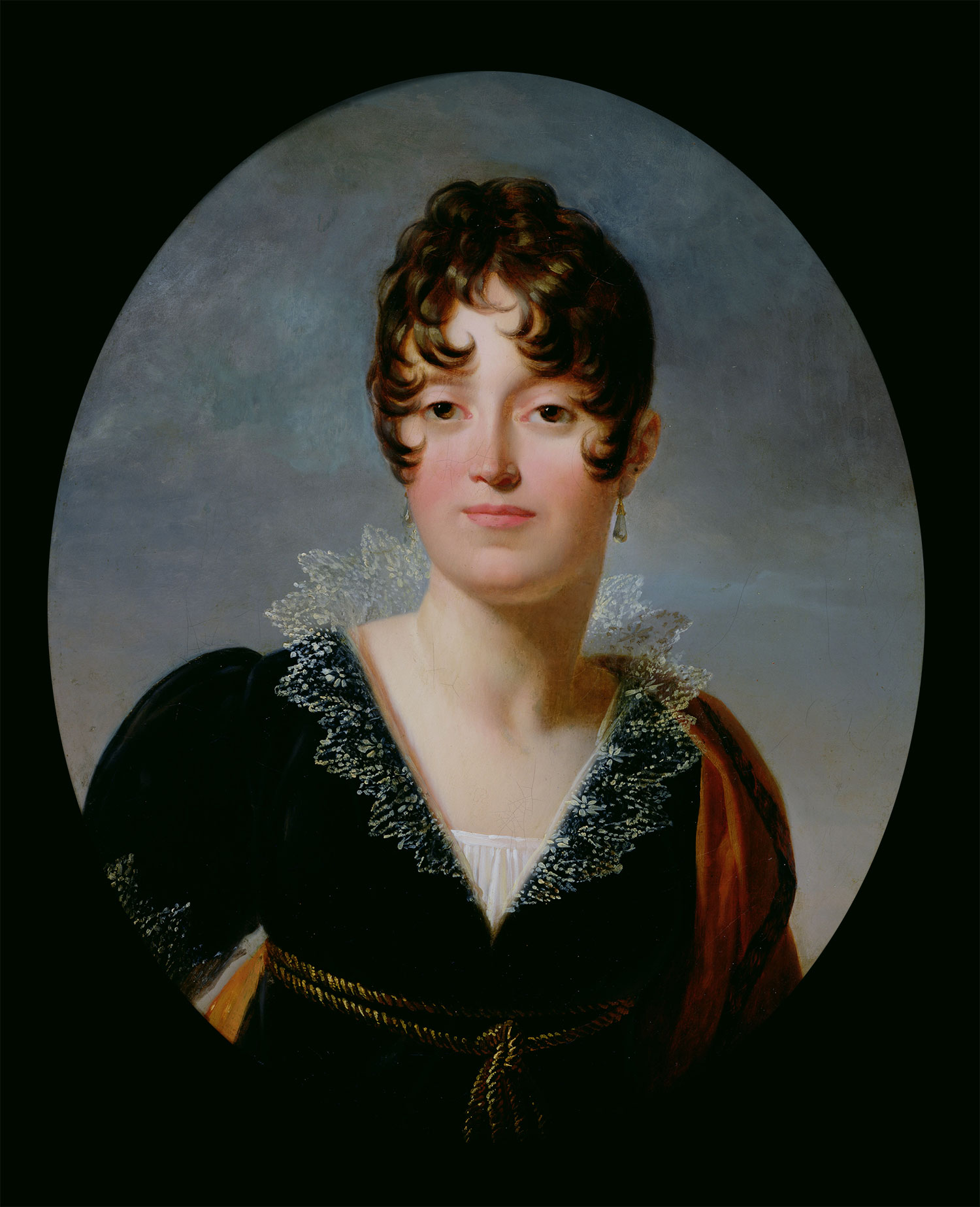
Désirée Clary by François Gérard (1810)

After her return to France, Clary lived with Julie and Joseph in Paris. In Paris, she lived in the circle of the Bonaparte family, who sided with her against Josephine after Napoleon had broken off their engagement. She herself did not like Josephine either, as she has been quoted calling her an aged courtesan with a deservedly bad reputation, but she is not believed to have shown any hostility toward Josephine as did the members of the Bonaparte family. She received a proposal from General Junot, but turned it down because it was given through Marmont. Clary eventually met her future spouse, Jean Baptiste Jules Bernadotte, another French general and politician. They were married in a secular ceremony at Sceaux on 17 August 1798. In the marriage contract, Clary was given economic independence. On 4 July 1799, she gave birth to their only child, a son named Oscar.

During the coup of 1799, when Napoleon took power, she was exposed to manipulation from both the Bonaparte family, who wanted Bernadotte to support Napoleon, and the Bernadotte faction, who wanted him to take action for himself. Both sides tried to use her to influence Bernadotte and extract information from him about his attitudes. Aware of this, he did not tell her of his plans, but he was later to say that it was because of family influence that he had been passive during the coup. During the coup, the couple were forced to take refuge in the country villa of General Sarrazin at Villeneuve St. Georges: she apparently dressed as a man during the escape. She kept in contact with Julie all the time, and Napoleon accepted Bernadotte apparently because of her.

In 1800, Désirée Bernadotte was present at a failed assassination attempt on Napoleon, when a bomb exploded between the carriage of Napoleon and the carriage where she and Caroline Bonaparte were sitting. She was not interested in politics, but her good connections made her a puppet in the hands of her husband and Napoleon, who both used her to influence each other and to pass messages. In 1801, her husband had her interfere in favor of General Ernouf through Joseph. In 1802, a conspiracy against Napoleon was discovered. Napoleon suspected Jean-Baptiste Bernadotte, and interrogated his wife, who naively told him that her spouse had not been involved, though he had met Moreau in their home and mumbled his name as well as the word conspiracy in his sleep. After this, Napoleon appointed her husband governor of Louisiana. The couple was ready to sail, when the appointment was retracted.

On 19 May 1804, her spouse was made Marshal of France, which gave her the equivalent position. However, she was described as indifferent to social position, like her sister Julie. Napoleon gave her an allowance, and a house in Rue d'Anjou Saint-Honoré, where she resided for the rest of her life when in Paris. At the Coronation of Napoleon on 2 December 1804, she followed Josephine, whose train was carried by her sisters-in-law, carrying the handkerchief and veil of Josephine on a pillow.

Her spouse was a leading general in the French army under Napoleon, and normally absent from Paris. He liked her to be a member of high society, and had her take lessons in dance and etiquette from an instructor Montel. Bernadotte had a good relationship with the Bonaparte Imperial family. Upon the request of her spouse, she did not have to be a lady-in-waiting, and did not participate in court life. She lived in the circle of the Bonaparte and Clary family and also participated in high society, where she enjoyed music, theater and dance, while she spent her summers at spas or her country villas at La Grange and Auteuil. It is believed that she may have had a romantic relationship with the Corsican Ange Chiappe, who often acted as her escort. She is described as pretty and pleasing and a skillful dancer, but fairly anonymous. She lived mostly separated from her spouse in Paris during his absence. She informed him about political events in Paris by correspondence.

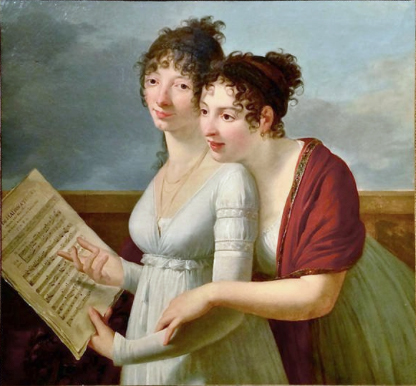
Queen Julie of Spain and her sister Désirée, Princess Bernadotte of Pontecorvo, as painted by Robert Lefèvre in 1810

During her husband's time as governor of the Hanseatic cities and governor of Hanover, Désirée visited him in Hamburg with her son a couple of times but she never stayed long; each time she soon returned to Paris. She was not happy living anywhere but Paris. In 1806, she was forced to accompany Empress Josephine to Mainz. When her spouse was made Prince of Pontecorvo in 1806, she worriedly asked if she would be forced to leave Paris, but was happy when she was assured that she would not. In 1807, she visited him in Spandau and in Marienburg in East Prussia, where she nursed him during his illness.

In August 1810, Bernadotte was elected heir to the throne of Sweden and she heiress, now in that position being given the official name of Desideria. She initially thought this was to be similar to the position of Prince of Pontecorvo, and did not expect to have to visit Sweden more than she had been forced to visit Pontecorvo: "I thought, that it was as it had been with Ponte Corvo, a place from where we would have a title." She was later to admit, that she had never cared about any other country than France and knew nothing of foreign countries nor did she care about them, and that she was in despair when she was told that this time, she would be expected to leave Paris. Desideria delayed her departure and did not leave with her spouse. She was delighted with the position she had received at the French court after her elevation to crown princess (she had been invited to court events every week), and she was frightened by the stories of her reluctant French servants, who tried to discourage her from leaving by saying that Sweden was a country close to the North Pole filled with Polar bears. Finally, she left Paris and traveled by Hamburg and Kronborg in Denmark over the Öresund to Helsingborg in Sweden.

== Crown Princess ==
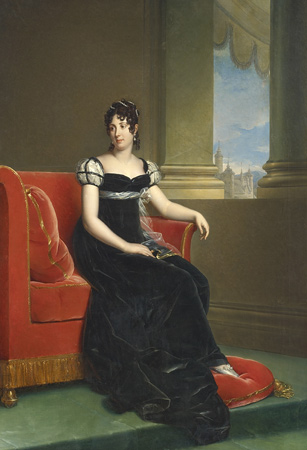
As Crown Princess of Sweden, wearing the Nationella dräkten, by R Lefévre.

On 22 December 1810, Desideria arrived with her son Oscar in Helsingborg in Sweden, and the 6 January 1811, she was introduced to the Swedish royal court at the Royal Palace in Stockholm. She had been met in Helsingborg by her appointed Mistress of the Robes Countess Caroline Lewenhaupt and the maid of honor Mariana Koskull. The Swedish climate was reportedly a shock for her: she arrived during the winter, and she hated the snow so much that she cried. Her spouse had converted upon his election as heir to the Swedish throne, and upon their arrival, her son was also to do so, as was required, and was taken from her to be brought up a Lutheran. There was, in accordance with the Tolerance Act, no demand that she should convert, and a Catholic chapel was arranged for her use. Desideria was not religious, but the Catholic masses served to remind her of France, and she had the birth of Napoleon II celebrated by a Te Deum in her chapel.

Desideria was unable to adapt to the demands of formal court etiquette or participate in the representational duties which were required of her in her position of Crown Princess. Her French entourage, especially Elise la Flotte, made her unpopular during her stay in Sweden by encouraging her to complain about everything. She did not have a good relationship with Queen Charlotte, though the Dowager Queen Sophia Magdalena was reportedly kind to her. In her famous diaries, Queen Charlotte described her as good hearted, generous and pleasant when she chose to be and not one to plot, but also an immature "spoiled child", who hated all demands and was unable to handle any form of representation, and as "a French woman in every inch" who disliked and complained about everything which was not French, and "consequently, she is not liked." Queen Charlotte, who wanted to remain the center of attention at her own court, was not pleased with Desideria and also influenced King Charles against her.

Desideria left Sweden in the summer of 1811 under the name of Countess of Gotland, officially because of her health, and returned to Paris, leaving her husband and her son behind. She herself said that the Swedish nobility had treated her as if they were made of ice: "Do not talk with me of Stockholm, I get a cold as soon as I hear the word." In Sweden, her husband took a mistress, the noblewoman Mariana Koskull.

Under the same alias, Desideria officially resided incognito in Paris, thereby avoiding politics. However, her house at rue d'Anjou was watched by the secret police, and her letters were read by them. She had no court, just her lady's companion Elise la Flotte to assist her as hostess at her receptions, and she mostly associated with a circle of close friends and family. Her receptions were frequented by Talleyrand and Fouché, who upon the mission of Napoleon tried to influence her consort through her. In 1812, she acted as mediator when Napoleon negotiated with her consort through the Duke de Bassano. Her consort liked her to be placed in Paris, where she could calm Napoleon's rage over the politics of Sweden and keep him informed about the events in the center of European politics, but as their correspondence has been lost, it is not known how political it was. During the meeting between her husband and Tsar Alexander I of Russia in Åbo in 1812, the Tsar suggested that Charles John divorce her and marry one of his sisters, but the King turned down the proposal.

Before his attack on Russia, Napoleon asked Desideria to leave France. She made herself ready to leave, but managed to avoid it. As she officially lived incognito, she could avoid politics when Sweden and France declared war in 1813. During the summer of 1813, she retired to the country estate of Julie, Mortefontaine, with Catharina of Württemberg to avoid attention before she returned to Paris New Year's Eve of 1814. The 31 March 1814, upon the arrival of the allied armies in Paris after the defeat of Napoleon, her house was a refuge for her sister Julie. She met up with her spouse, who was among the allied generals to arrive in Paris. She did not return with him to Sweden when he left, however, which attracted attention. When asked why by the Swedish Count Jacob De la Gardie at Mortefontaine, she answered that she was afraid that she would be divorced if she did.

On 14 May 1814, she was introduced to Louis XVIII, whose court she often visited the following years and whom she is said to have liked quite well. After the Hundred Days in 1815, the members of the Bonaparte family were exiled from France. This included her sister Julie, and when Louis XVIII expressed a wish to do her a favor, she regularly asked him to make an exception for Julie and allow her to live in Paris. In 1816, she made plans to return to Sweden, but she wished to bring her sister, Julie, along with her. Her husband thought this unwise. Julie was the wife of a Bonaparte and her presence might be taken as a sign that he sided with the deposed Napoleon. In the end, this came to nothing. At this point, she often spent time with Germaine de Staël and Juliette Récamier. In 1817, Desideria's husband placed a Count de Montrichard in her household as his spy to report if she did anything which could affect him.

== Queen consort ==
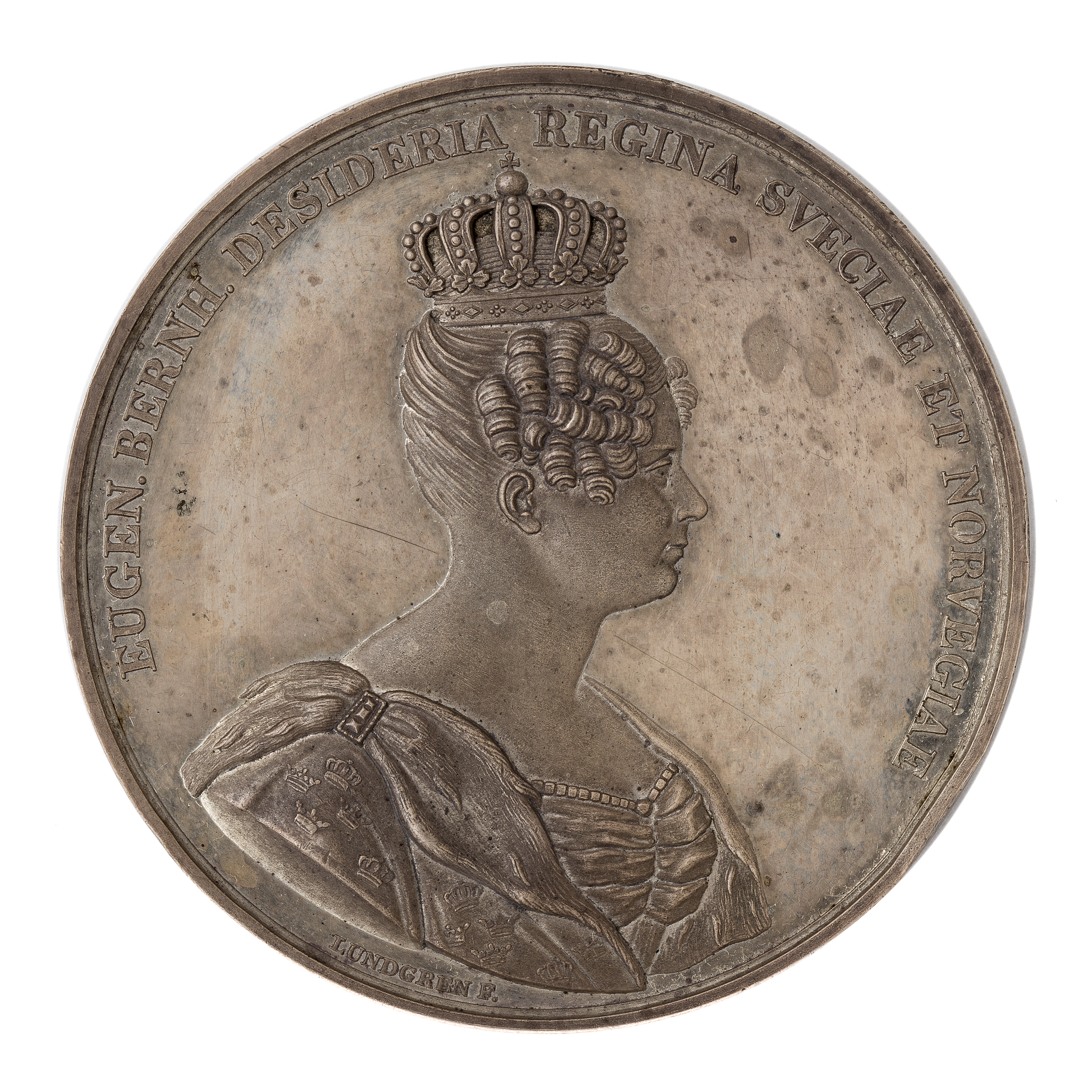
Queen Desideria of Sweden and Norway as shown on her coronation medallion wearing the Crown of the Queen

In 1818, her husband became King of Sweden, which made Desideria queen. However, she remained in France, officially for health reasons, which caused speculations in the press in Paris and by her visitors. After she became queen, the queen dowager wrote to her and suggested that she should have Swedish ladies-in-waiting, but she replied that it was unnecessary for her to have a court since she still resided incognito. She officially kept herself incognito and did not host any court, but she kept in contact with the Swedish embassy, regularly visited the court of Louis XVIII, and often saw Swedes at her receptions, which she hosted on Thursdays and Sundays, unofficially in her role as queen, though she still used the title of countess.

During this period, she fell in love with the French prime minister, the Duc de Richelieu, which attracted attention. According to one version, she fell in love with him after Louis XVIII had assigned him to deny her regular appeal for her sister Julie in the most charming way possible. True or not, she did fall in love with him, but the affection was not returned by Richelieu, who referred to her as his "crazy Queen". According to Laure Junot, she did not dare to speak to him or approach him, but she followed him wherever he went, tried to make contact with him, followed him on his trip to Spa, and had flowers placed in his room. She followed him around until his death in 1822. Another version of her behavior toward him was, that her consort had given her the task to make contact with Richelieu for political reasons, but that his attitude had made her too embarrassed to do so.

During the summer of 1822, her son Oscar made a trip in Europe to inspect prospective brides, and it was decided they should meet. As France was deemed unsuitable, they met in Aachen and a second time in Switzerland. In 1823, Desideria returned to Sweden together with her son's bride, Josephine of Leuchtenberg. It was intended to be a visit, but she was to remain in Sweden for the rest of her life. She and Josephine arrived in Stockholm 13 June 1823. Three days later, the royal court and the government were presented to her, and on 19 June, she participated in the official welcoming of Josephine and witnessed the wedding. A well-known story is that after her return to Sweden there was a warm and dry period, so the peasants turning up to see her were coaxed into greeting her with "Vi vill ha regn!" ("We want rain!"), which in the Scanian dialect sounds very similar to the French "Vive la Reine!" ("Long live the Queen!").

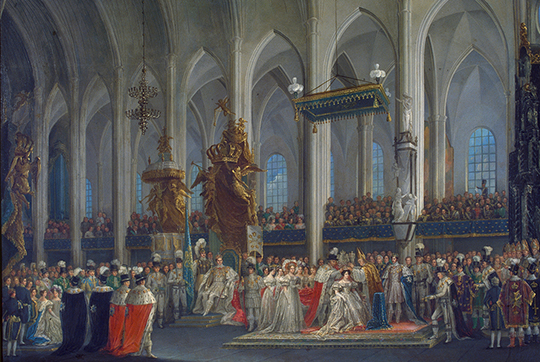
Desideria's Swedish coronation in 1829, by Fredric Westin.

On 21 August 1829, she was crowned Queen of Sweden in Storkyrkan in Stockholm. Her coronation had been suggested upon her return, but her husband had postponed it because he feared there could be religious difficulties. There was actually a suggestion that she should convert to the Lutheran faith before her coronation, but in the end, the question was not considered important enough to press, and she was crowned all the same. She was crowned at her own request after having pressed Charles John with a wish that she should be crowned as "otherwise she would be no proper Queen". A reason for her insistence is believed to have been that she regarded it as protection against divorce. She was, however, never crowned in Norway because of her status as a Catholic, despite requesting to be crowned there as well. She was the first commoner to become a queen of Sweden since Karin Månsdotter in 1568.

The relationship between her and her husband King Charles XIV John was somewhat distant, but friendly. Charles John treated her with some irritability, while she behaved very freely and informally toward him. The court was astonished by her informal behavior. She could enter his bedroom and stay there until late at night even though he hinted to her that he wished to be alone with his favorite Count Magnus Brahe. Every morning, she visited her husband in her nightgown, which was seen as shocking, because her husband usually conferred with members of the council of state in his bedchamber at that time. Because of their difference in habits, they seldom saw each other even though they lived together. Because she was always late at dinner, for example, he stopped having his meals with her, and as he also preferred to have his meals alone, it was not uncommon for the nobles of the court to sit alone at the dinner table, without the royal couple present.

There is nothing to indicate that Queen Desideria ever had any political influence, and she was praised for her lack of interference in politics. Whenever Charles John became agitated, she was known to be able to calm him with the one firm word "Bernadotte!" One such anecdote was when Charles John, known for his hot temperament, raged about how he would punish some political advisories in various ways. For every punishment he stated, she is said to have struck her fan in the table and said to the surrounding courtiers "He could not hurt a cat!", upon which the court started to laugh. She was also to have said "Oh, I like to hear you say that, you who do not even have the heart to wring the neck of a cat!"

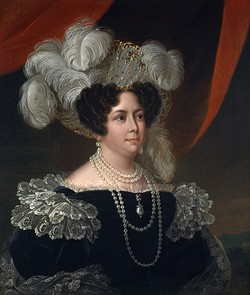
Queen Desideria about 1830

Queen Desideria enjoyed social life, but only if it was informal, and her strong dislike of court etiquette, and refusal to submit to it, made it hard for her to accustom to her position as queen and make herself respected by the nobility, who privately ridiculed her difficulty to adjust to etiquette, and she was also regarded with some snobbery because of her past as a merchant's daughter and a republican.

Consequently, it was difficult for her to discipline her aristocratic ladies-in-waiting, whom Charles John appointed without consulting her, and who preferred to sort out conflicts regarding etiquette among themselves instead of asking her to mediate, which on at least one occasion led to a scene which caused Charles John to reprimand her: "Try to make your ladies not to announce their actions and conflicts to the public as it happened the day you departed from Stockholm", after an incident when two ladies-in-waiting had "screamed like rower madams" about precedence in the seats of the queen's carriage during a journey. These difficulties were somewhat subdued during the tenure of her niece Marcelle Tascher de la Pagerie, who made a social success, and her first years as queen are described as a time of balls and parties, more than had been seen at the Swedish court since the days of King Gustav III. After the departure of Tascher to France, however, Désirée's difficulties with court life became more marked. She gradually reduced her participation in social life because she could find not pleasure in it when it must be conducted in accordance with etiquette. Her dislike of formal court etiquette remained her foremost complaint about her life in Sweden in her letters to her sister Julie:

"How boring courts can be, when you are not born within them. [...] The ladies who attend me are not very funny and I am forced to restrict myself physically and morally [...] I can never adjust myself to the strict etiquette, which must always be observed at court [...] When you live surrounded by a court and are forced to express your feelings in the form of polite phrases, which are demanded at court, the difficulties are so great that you would rather not."

Consequently, with time she participated less and less in court life, and it was said that she "spent her most time in her own apartment, where her thoughts with regret trailed back to the time when she, surrounded by affectionate friends, lived in France free from the prison of etiquette." By the early 1830s, she had grown tired of her royal status and wished to return to Paris, but her husband refused to allow it. This is not to say that Désirée did not befriend some of her courtiers, particularly Countess Clara Bonde, who was her favorite from her arrival in 1823 to her death. After the departure of her niece to France, she often socialized with the rich merchant Carl Abraham Arfwedson, who had once been a guest in her childhood home. Among her other more known ladies-in-waiting were the Norwegians Kathinka Falbe and Jana Falbe. Because of Desideria's eccentric habits, they were known as "Strapatsfröknarna" (approximately "Mesdemoiselles Calamity"). During her stays at Rosersberg Palace and in spite of her fear of the dark, she took walks in the park at night, and instructed one lady-in-waiting to walk in front of her dressed in white to keep bats away from her.

Desideria was interested in fashion, devoted a lot of interest and pride in her hair and wore low cut dresses until an advanced age. She enjoyed dancing: her standard question at court presentations was if the debutantes liked to dance, and she herself danced well also during her old age. Her conversations were mainly about her old life in France. She never learned to speak the Swedish language, and there are many anecdotes of her attempts to speak the language. Her lack of etiquette became more accepted over the years, as she became known as an eccentric in other aspects.

Like her daughter-in-law, Desideria was a Catholic, but in contrast to Josephine, who was a devout and practicing Catholic, she never was. Her devout Catholic daughter-in-law insisted that she attend mass and confession. She did attend masses to please Josephine, but stated that she had no sins to confess. When the priest started to preach and reprimand her, she silenced him and stated that such talk irritated her nerves.

Her favorite summer residence was Rosersberg Palace, where she kept chickens for pets, but as Rosersberg was remote, she more commonly stayed at Haga Palace. She also often visited Swedish spas, such as Ramlösa.

Desideria visited Norway for the first time in 1825. In Norway, she is mostly known as the patroness of Maria Schandorff's Eugenia stiftelse (Eugenia Foundation) for poor girls in Oslo, named for the queen, which she often visited from 1828 until 1847.

== Queen Mother ==
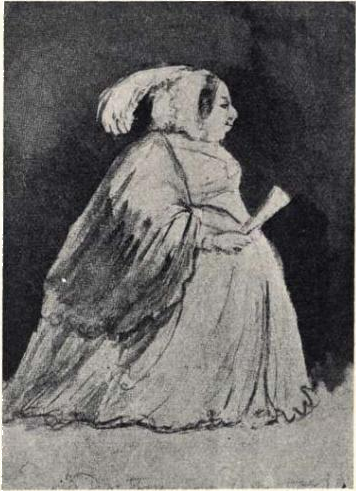
An 1850s caricature of Dowager Queen Desideria by Fritz von Dardel

In 1844, Charles XIV John died and Desideria became the queen mother. Her son, the new King Oscar I, allowed her to keep living in the queen's quarters in the Royal Palace as well as her entire court staff out of consideration, so that she would not have to change her habits. When her daughter-in-law Queen Josephine tried to convince her to reduce her court of her own free will, saying that she no longer needed such a big court as a queen mother, she answered "It is true that I no longer need them all, but all of them still need me." She was a considerate and well-liked employer among her staff.

Desideria did engage in charity but it was discreet, and it has been said: "Her charity was considerable but took place in silence". One example was that she supported poor upper-class women by giving them sewing work. She also acted as official protector of charitable institutions, such as the Women's Society Girl School. The same year she became a widow, she was described by the French diplomat Bacourt: "Royalty has not altered her — unfortunately, for the reputation of the Crown. She has always been and will always remain an ordinary merchant woman, surprised over her position, and surprising to find upon a throne." He also added that she was a goodhearted woman.

After her return to Sweden in 1823, Desideria had kept her house at Rue d'Anjou in Paris awaiting her return. It was managed by her sister Catherine Honorine Villeneuve and her old French staff, while her business in France was managed by her nephew, Imperial Count Clary. In May 1853, after Napoleon III had made himself French emperor, she made preparations to return to Paris. Everything was ready, and she was escorted to her ship in Karlskrona by her grandson Prince Oscar, Duke of Östergötland. Her fear of sea travels, however, made it impossible for her to leave.

During her last years, she was worried about her house in Paris because of the plans of the city architect Haussmann, but Napoleon III made an exception for her and allowed for her house to stand, which it did until one year after her death. Desideria had a fairly harmonious relationship with her daughter-in-law, and felt sympathy for her grandson's bride, Princess Louise of the Netherlands.

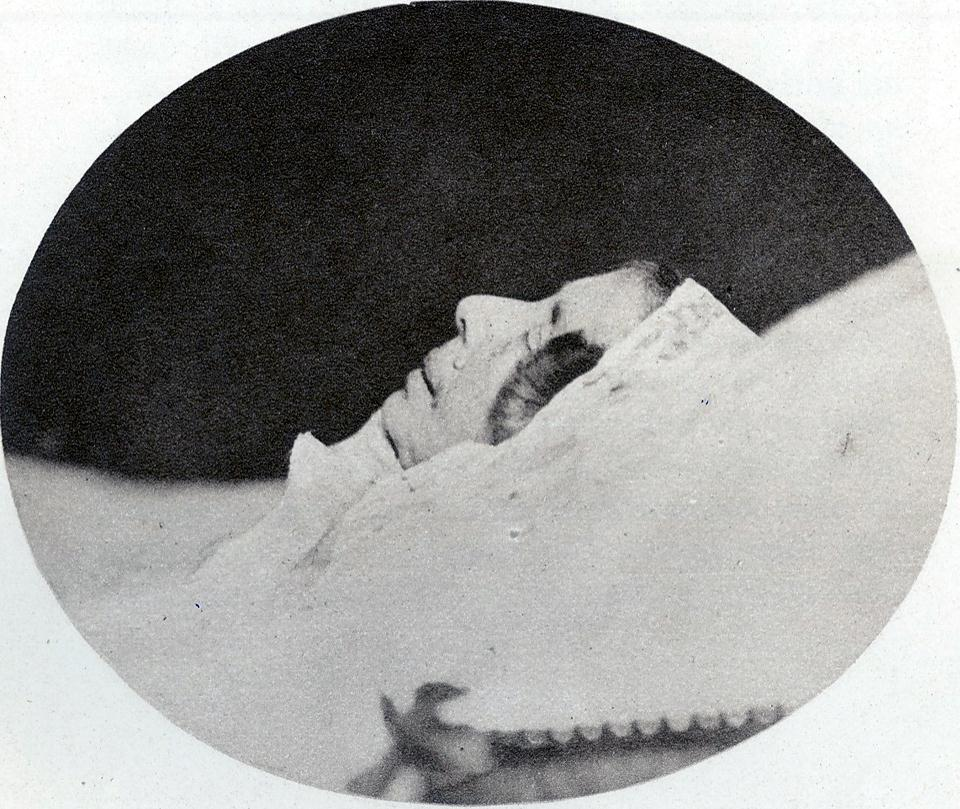
Photograph at her deathbed

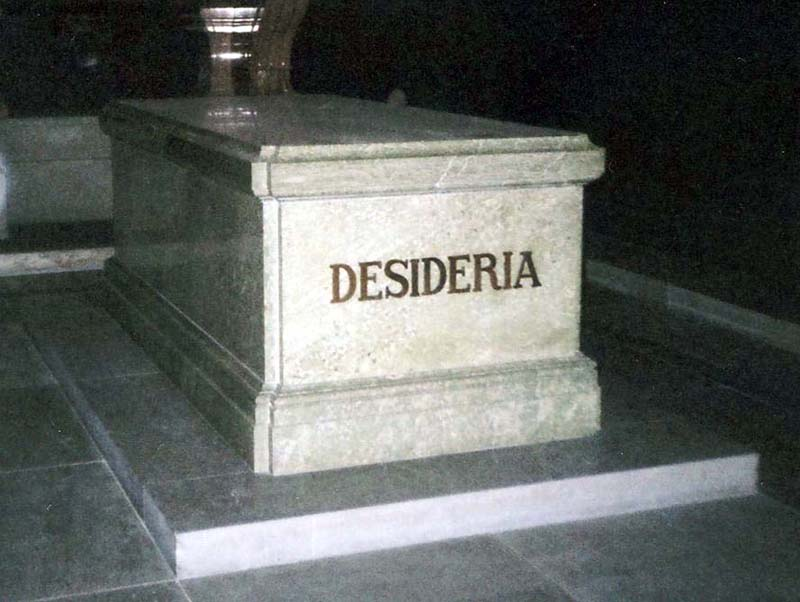
Desideria's sarcophagus in Riddarholm Church

During her later years as queen, and particularly as a queen mother, she became known for her eccentricity. She is known to have kept reversed hours and, consequently, for often being late and keeping guests waiting, something which agitated her spouse. Normally, she retired at four in the morning, and awoke at two o'clock in the afternoon. Before she went to bed, she took a "walk by carriage". During these trips, she often paid unannounced visits, which were normally inconvenient because of the time. When the weather was bad, her carriage drove round the courtyard of the royal palace instead. It was normal for her to arrive for a visit to an opera when the show had ended. She went to bed in the morning, got up in the evening, ate breakfast at night and wandered around the corridors of the sleeping palace with a light. An anecdote illustrates this: in 1843, a palace guard saw the Queen fully dressed on a palace balcony in the middle of the night. When he came home to his wife, he told her that she was lazy in comparison to the Queen, who had gotten up hours before sunrise. He thought the Queen Mother was up earlier than anyone else in town, but in fact, she had not yet gone to bed.

Desideria sometimes would take in children from the streets to the palace and give them sweets; she was not able to engage in any real conversation, but she would say "Kom, kom!" (Swedish for "Come come!")

There are stories about people having been awakened by her carriage when she drove through the streets at night. The carriage sometimes stopped; she would sleep for a while, and then she would wake and the carriage would continue on its way. Her habit of circling the courtyard in her coach she called "Kring kring" (Swedish for "around and around"), one of the few Swedish words she learned.

On 17 December 1860, Queen Desideria entered her box at the Royal Swedish Opera just after the performance had ended and upon returning to Stockholm Palace, she collapsed before reaching her apartment, dying at 83 years of age in the reign of her grandson King Charles XV (her son King Oscar I having predeceased her). Following a Catholic ceremony on 10 January 1861, Queen Desideria was interred the next day alongside her husband, in Riddarholmen Church.

== Arms and monogram ==
Desideria's coat of arms as Queen of Sweden and Norway	Royal monogram of Queen Desideria

== Honours ==
- Bavaria : Dame of the Order of Saint Elizabeth.

== In fiction ==
Désirée Clary has been the subject of several novels and films.

- Désirée (1951), by Annemarie Selinko, a novel in the form of a mock autobiography. It was originally published in German, by Kiepenheuer & Witsch, and became a worldwide best-seller. It has been translated into many languages, including Chinese, Dutch, English, Estonian, French, Italian, Greek, Hungarian, Spanish, Persian, Slovenian and Turkish.
- Le Destin fabuleux de Désirée Clary (also Mlle. Désirée) (1942), a French film by Sacha Guitry.
- Désirée (1954), an American film based on Selinko's book, with Jean Simmons as Désirée and Marlon Brando as Napoleon.
- Napoleon and Love (1974), British TV series, Désirée is played by Karen Dotrice.
- The Bernadotte Album (1918), a "screen treatment" by John B. Langan on the lives of Clary and Joséphine (née Marie Tascher), which purported to be "Founded on the memoirs of Marie Tascher and Désirée Clary."
- The Queen's Fortune: A Novel of Desiree, Napoleon, and the Dynasty that Outlived the Empire (2020), by Allison Pataki, a first-person narrative covering Clary's life.

== Notes ==
Désirée Clary Born: 8 November 1777 Died: 17 December 1860
Royal titles
Preceded by Hedvig Elisabeth Charlotte of Holstein-Gottorp	Queen consort of Sweden and Norway; 1818–1844	Succeeded by Josephine of Leuchtenberg
