= Maria Schandorff =

Norwegian philanthropist and social educator

Maria Schandorff (22 January 1784 – 27 September 1848) was a Norwegian philanthropist and social educator.

== Biography ==
Andrine Maria Schandorff was born in Drammen, Norway. She was the daughter of the merchant Jens Constantin Lasson (1743–1830) and Margrethe Elisabeth Schaar (1754–1828) and married the official Jacob Christlieb Schandorff in 1816. In 1827, she founded Eugenia Stiftelse in Oslo, a strictly religious charity institution for female orphans, which was named after Queen Eugenia Bernhardina Desideria of Norway and Sweden, who became the protector of the establishment. In 1830, a weaving mill was expanded, providing the foundation with necessary revenue from the sale of the products. From the beginning, the child asylum was only for girls, but after the municipality promised the asylum support, it was also opened for boys. She was a teacher and manager at the foundation until her death in 1848. The Eugenia Stiftelse orphanage lasted until 1913.
