= Mariana Koskull =

Swedish lady-in-waiting and royal mistress (1785–1841)

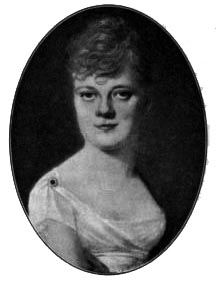
Mariana Koskull

Henrietta Mariana "Marianne" Charlotta Koskull (19 February 1785, in Växjö – 30 March 1841, in Stockholm) was a Swedish noble and lady-in-waiting, known as the royal mistress of King Charles XIII of Sweden and King Charles XIV John of Sweden.

== Life ==
Mariana, or Marianne as she was often called at the French-influenced court, was born to Baron Gustaf Fredrik Koskull (a member of the aristocratic Koskull family) and Anna Charlotta Gjelstrup. Although the family belonged to the nobility, they were poor, which was illustrated by the fact that her sister Constance Koskull (nicknamed 'Stansa') was forced to break her engagement to marry Christian Fredrik Damm, with whom she was in love, and marry the rich merchant John Hall the Younger for money instead. Reportedly, her father said to her: "Are you so stupid my Stansa!? Keep loving your Fredrik, but marry Hall – one does not prevent the other! We shall soon be reduced to beggary if you refuse Hall."

Koskull was given a good education and, thanks to her rank, was appointed hovfröken (maid of honour) to Queen Charlotte, thus acquiring one of few professions socially acceptable for a noblewoman. She became a social success at court, where she was admired for her musicality and her talent as an actress. She was a good harp player, and often played the main part in the amateur theatre at court at special occasions and festivities, during which she was described as having as much talent as a professional actress.

On 28 January 1811, Koskull participated to great acclaim in an amateur performance of The Barber of Seville, which was given by members of the nobility at the Royal Palace in honor of the king's name day and the arrival of the crown princess. Koskull played the role of Rosina opposite Baron Gustaf Löwenhielm as Bartholo, Count Axel Mörner as Bazile, Count Carl Löwenhielm as Figaro and Count Gustaf Adolf Sparre as Alzade, followed by a ballet also performed by members of the court nobility.

=== Royal mistress ===
Koskull was known as the mistress of King Charles XIII as well as the mistress to his adopted successor, King Charles XIV John (crowned 1818). Koskull and Charles John were said to have had a secret child together, but this is unconfirmed.

After the succession of Charles XIII in 1809, Koskull was talked about as the mistress of the king. Queen Charlotte, however, brushed this aside with the comment that the king may have been infatuated with Koskull but was too decrepit to do anything about it. In parallel to being talked about as the lover of Charles XIII, Koskull was also identified as the lover of the king's adopted son and heir, Crown Prince Charles John, who arrived in Sweden in 1810. The affair reportedly started after Charles John's wife Désirée Clary left Sweden for France in 1811, and after the crown prince had first unsuccessfully courted Koskull's cousin Aurora Wilhelmina Brahe. The affair was evidently hidden for four years before being exposed, as Queen Charlotte commented in her famous journal that Koskull and Charles John had begun the affair the year of the departure of the crown princess to Paris in 1811, but that it was not exposed until the spring of 1815, when she the queen herself became certain of it.

In June 1815, Queen Charlotte summarized the relationship between Koskull, Charles XIII, Crown Prince and Prince Oscar in her journal:

Marianne Koskull is not a true beauty but looks quite good, is thoughtless, vain, wishes only to amuse herself and is spoiled by having been commonly admired. She is actually of a good heart but offends people by sheer thoughtlessness. The King was pleased by Marianne, often made jokes with her and, despite his advance age, acted as her lover without actually being able to be one. This lady is lively, talented and quite educated. She has the great quality of showing goodness to her family and takes care of the welfare of her siblings. Unfortunately she lacks discipline and has the grave fault of being utterly calculating. Although the Crown Prince has become enchanted by her, she should rather think about entering a suitable marriage than to be in his favor. While I cannot guarantee the truth of it, she is said to be his mistress. He wanted to keep this a secret and show all outwardly modesty, but Miss Koskull was so flattered to be in his favor that she was constantly bragging about it, flaunting magnificent jewelry of such value that they could only have come from the Crown Prince. In any event, she was commonly viewed as his favorite. Prince Oscar often met her at his father's and begun to court her, which at one occasion caused his governor baron Cederhjelm to say, after Marianne had flirted with the Prince for quite a while: 'For God's sake Milady, spare the third generation, you are corrupting them all at once.' A crushing remark, when you consider the decrepit state of the King and the fact that Prince Oscar is so young that he could barely enjoy the pleasures of love as yet. Cederhjelm is a wit, known for his ingenious and somewhat mean remarks, which is why his comment could hardly be surprising.

In 1816, when the crown princess was rumored to be returning to Sweden (which ultimately did not occur), the queen remarked that the crown prince did not wish her return because of his relationship with Koskull.

During her parallel affair with the king and the crown prince, Koskull had a painting placed in one of the king's salons with a different image on each side, which was used to signal to the crown prince. One side of the painting showed Koskull painted as one of the muses (Terpsichore), and the other side showed an image of a fortune teller. Reportedly, when the painting was turned with the image of the fortune teller visible, it was a sign to the crown prince that that day was her day with the king; if it showed the image of the muse, then she would spend the day with the crown prince.

Koskull reportedly used her influence with both Charles XIII and Charles John (who was acting regent during the reign of Charles XIII) to promote relatives and proteges to lucrative offices. In January 1817, Queen Charlotte noted in her journal:

Miss Koskull is eager to recommend first one and then another. Sometimes it may be out of kindness, for she does really have a good heart, but also to show her power. That happened recently, when her brother Baron Gustaf Koskull was appointed lieutenant of the royal guard.

At court, she was accused of abusing her influence over the crown prince to attain a promotion to Captain lieutenant of the royal guard for her brother Gustaf Adolf Koskull, who was ill-reputed for being a rake both at court and with his own relatives, the Brahe family.

An anecdote was told about Koskull's influence upon Charles XIII:

Charles XIII became more decrepit and apathetic each year. He did preside at the councils, but usually slept. The candidacy to clerical appointment was suggested. The name of the parish awoke him. 'No, wait. Marianne Koskull wanted that.' He searched through his pocket, found the note she had given him and her protege was given the lucrative parish.

Her position made her courted by supplicants but also other influential people: statesman count Johan Christopher Toll courted her influence, not only because she was a royal mistress, but also because she was related to countess Aurora Wilhelmina Brahe, who was the well-liked stepmother of the royal favorite Magnus Brahe (1790–1844).

In 1818, Charles XIII died and Charles John became King Charles XIV John. During the years between the death of Queen Charlotte in 1818 and the arrival of Queen Désirée and Crown Princess Josephine in 1823 (and with Princess Sophia Albertina of Sweden preferring to live in retirement due to her age) there was no female royalty at court. Koskull was in effect the leading lady of the court as the official mistress of the king, who reportedly preferred to live "the life of a rich private citizen" in her company and did not uphold much of a court life. During this period, she lived in a grand apartment in the Royal Palace. Koskull had her sister Constance Koskull, who had been ostracized from the aristocracy because she had abandoned her husband and lived openly with a lover, formally presented at court. All the noblewomen who were asked to present her simulated illness until the last one, the lady-in-waiting countess Ruth, finally agreed to perform the presentation, and "fainted immediately afterwards."

=== Later life ===
In 1823, when Queen Désirée returned to Sweden in the company of the new crown princess after eleven years of absence, the king appointed Koskull, as well as the crown prince's mistress Jacquette Löwenhielm, as ladies-in-waiting to the queen. Koskull was appointed to the position of kammarfröken (senior maid of honour), the highest post possible for an unmarried noblewoman of the royal household, which she kept until her death. The queen seldom had any influence over who was appointed to her household, but the position of lady-in-waiting did not necessarily force her to spend time with any lady-in-waiting she disliked, and the position gave Koskull a high income and a legitimate reason to remain at court and live a comfortable life.

After the queen and the crown princess were installed, the formal representational court life was revived in Sweden and Koskull was no longer an official mistress of the king, and it is noted that she moved out of her grand apartments in the Royal Palace, which illustrated her position as an official mistress, to a more modest one befitting a normal lady-in-waiting. Whether the relationship between Koskull and Charles XIV John actually discontinued, or if it was simply conducted discreetly after this, is not known, but she is no longer mentioned in the position as his mistress after 1823.

Koskull died unmarried and childless.
