= Sprengtporten =

Sprengtporten is a Swedish-language nobiliary surname, most notably borne by members of the Sprengtporten family. It may refer to the following people:

- Georg Magnus Sprengtporten (1740–1819), Finland-Swedish politician, half-brother of Jacob Magnus and Johan Vilhelm
- Jacob Magnus Sprengtporten (1727–1786), Finland-Swedish army officer and politician, brother of Johan Vilhelm and half-brother of Georg Magnus
- Jakob Wilhelm Sprengtporten (1794–1875), Swedish politician, son of Johan Vilhelm
- Johan Vilhelm Sprengtporten (1720–1795), Swedish army officer and politician, brother of Jacob Magnus and half-brother of Georg Magnus
- Ulla De Geer (née Sprengtporten; 1793–1869), Swedish salon holder, daughter of Johan Vilhelm
