= Axel Löwen =

Swedish count

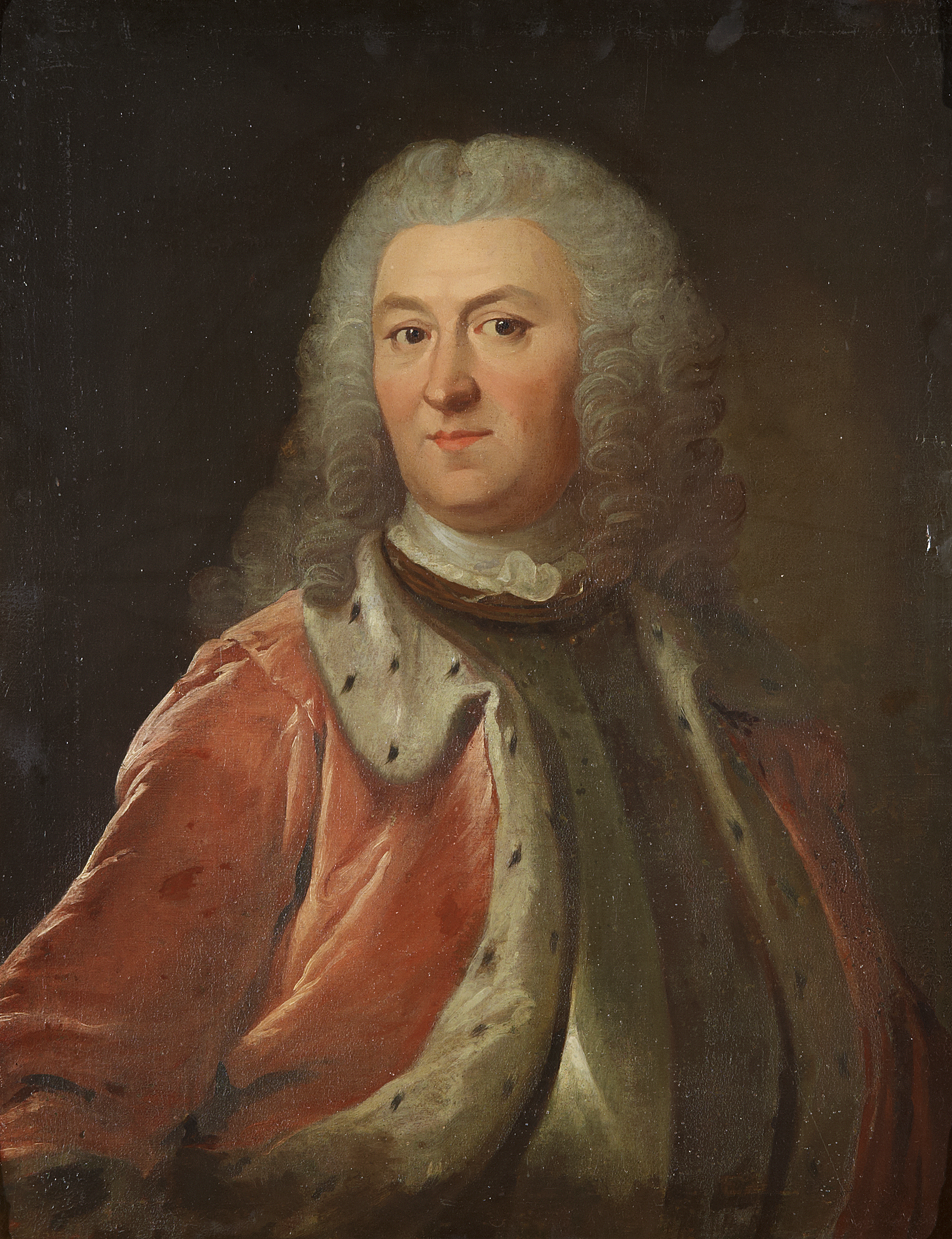
Axel Löwen in a portrait

Axel Löwen (1 November 1686 – 25 July 1773) was a count and Swedish Knight of the Seraphim, Commander of the Order of the Sword and privy counsellor. Löwen was a volunteer in the Fortification Corps in 1702, got his main military education abroad, and in 1712 became lieutenant-quartermaster general (a rank corresponding to lieutenant colonel) in the German provinces. He became noted at the siege of Stade, where he also was taken as a prisoner by the Danes. In 1713 he managed to escape, sneaking during nighttime through the sachisk posts to Stralsund in July 1713.

In 1714, he prepared the defences of Wismar, and in 1715 he was part of the siege of Stralsund and took Kudön, close to Stralsund. In 1716 he was part of the campaign in Norway and at the battle of Norderhov he was again captured and became a prisoner of the Danes, Anna Colbjørnsdatter was part of this event. He was released in an exchange in 1719, and the same year he became major general and Quartermaster General and director of the Swedish Fortification Corps. He made plans for additional fortifications, amongst them at Oxdjupet (Stockholm), and Hamina and Lappeenranta, both in Finland. In 1731, he became a baron.

From 1746 until his death, he was a member of the Royal Swedish Academy of Sciences and in 1751 he became a count. He married Eva Horn af Ekebyholm, daughter of Arvid Horn, and became the father of Eva Löwen, grandfather of Adolph Ribbing, and great-grandfather of the French theatre director Adolphe de Leuven.

== Literature ==
- Grewolls, Grete (2011). Wer war wer in Mecklenburg und Vorpommern. Das Personenlexikon (in German). Rostock: Hinstorff Verlag. pp. 5995–5996. ISBN 978-3-356-01301-6.
