= Axel Wrede Sparre =

Swedish nobleman (1708–1772)

Axel Wrede-Sparre
- Count
- 1770 portrait

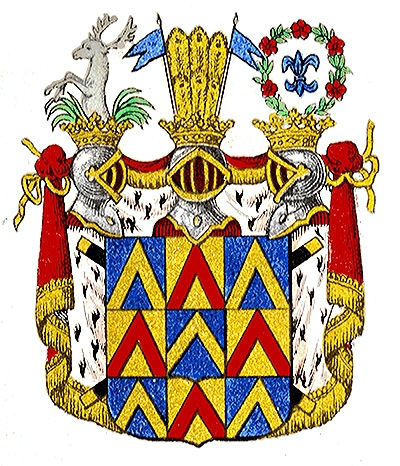
- Coat of arms
- Full name: Axel Wrede-Sparre af Sundby
- Styles: Count
- Other titles: Count of Sundby and Östanå, Lord of Fånö, Nynäs, and Åkerö
- Born: Axel Sparre; 1 December 1708; Stockholm, Sweden
- Died: 19 January 1772 (aged 63); Stockholm, Sweden
- Noble family: Sparre / Wrede
- Wife: Christina Margareta Augusta Törnflycht
- Children: 6 (including Ulrika Sofia Wrede-Sparre and Lovisa Augusta Wrede-Sparre)
- Father: Count Erik Sparre af Sundby
- Mother: Countess Sophia Wrede
- Occupation: Military officer, civil servant, politician
- Education: Uppsala University

Axel Wrede-Sparre af Sundby (1 December 1708 – 19 January 1772) was a Swedish nobleman, military officer, civil servant, and figure in Swedish Freemasonry. Born into the Sparre family, he inherited extensive estates from his maternal grandfather, Fabian Wrede, and adopted his surname. Wrede-Sparre served in the Life Regiment of Horse and the Västergötland Cavalry Regiment, eventually being promoted to the rank of Major General of the Cavalry (generalmajor av kavalleriet) in 1760 and serving as President of the War College from 1768.

In 1735, Wrede-Sparre established the first Masonic Lodge in Sweden. Toward the end of his career, he was appointed Governor of Stockholm in 1770, a post he held until his death. As his two sons predeceased him, the male line of the Sparre af Sundby comital branch ended upon his death in 1772.

== Early life ==
Axel Sparre was born in Stockholm on 1 December 1708 (noted in some sources as 3 December 1708). His parents were Count Erik Sparre af Sundby, a Field Marshal and diplomat, and Countess Sophia Wrede.

His mother died on 14 December 1708 due to complications related to childbirth. To appease his grieving in-laws, Count Erik devoted the newborn to the care of the child's maternal grandparents, Count Fabian Wrede and Brita Cruus. Following Fabian Wrede's death in 1712, Axel inherited his grandfather's substantial estates. He adopted his mother's surname and called himself Wrede-Sparre.

On 11 November 1716, he enrolled as a student at Uppsala University.

== Military and administrative career ==
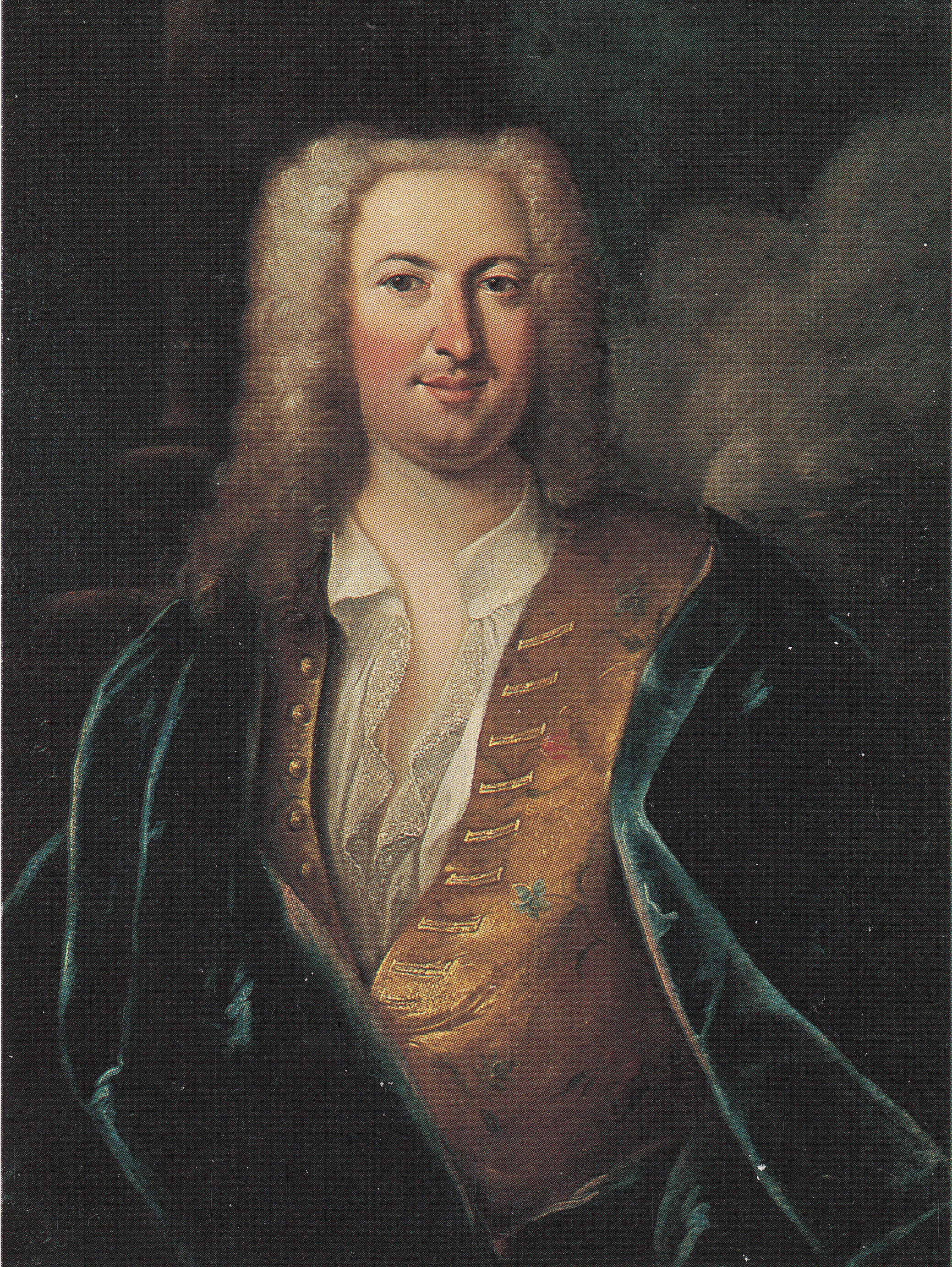
Axel Wrede Sparre in 1730, painted by Martin van Meytens

Wrede-Sparre began his military career as a volunteer in the Life Regiment of Horse in 1728. By 1734 or 1731, he was promoted to lieutenant in the same regiment.

In 1733 he was imprisoned in Paris due to a large debt. Despite his substantial inherited fortune, Wrede-Sparre's lavish lifestyle, and large social circle nearly drove him to financial ruin. Consequently, he was placed under the legal guardianship of his maternal cousin, Privy Councilor (riksrådet) Fabian Wrede.

In 1744, Wrede-Sparre was promoted to Cavalry Master (Ryttmastare). He was transferred to the Västergötland Cavalry Regiment in 1747, where he served as a lieutenant-colonel, and in 1749, he was given colonelcy to the Västergötland Cavalry Regiment. Wrede-Sparre delegated command of his regiment to a lieutenant-colonel. He was made knight of the Royal Order of the Sword in 1748.

In 1760, Wrede-Sparre was promoted to Major General of the Cavalry (generalmajor av kavalleriet). In 1768, he became the president of the War College (krigskollegium). Later that year, he was made a Commander Grand Cross of the Royal Order of the Sword.

Wrede-Sparre was appointed Governor of Stockholm in 1770, a position he held until his death. His appointment was met with contemporary criticism; Daniel Tilas remarked that "no more incompetent man" could have been appointed, as he possessed neither "experience, understanding, disposition nor enough sobriety to manage such an important office." In the same year, he was appointed Director of the House of Nobility (riddarhusdirektör).

== Freemasonry ==
Wrede-Sparre became a Freemason in 1731, at an English lodge in Paris. When he returned to Sweden in 1734, he and many other Swedes who had become Freemasons elsewhere joined the Awazu och Wallasis, a Swedish precursor to an official masonic lodge. Many members of Awazu och Wallasis were members of the Hats, including Wrede-Sparre himself. During the Riksdag of 1734, members of Awazu would push for war with Russia and an alliance with France, which was thwarted by Count Arvid Horn and King Frederick I.

When the diet adjourned in December 1734, Carl Gustaf Tessin and Wrede-Sparre created plans for an alternative Masonic network, where they could push their agenda. In 1735, Wrede-Sparre would establish his own lodge, the Saint-Jean Auxilliare, the first masonic lodge in Sweden. The first meeting was attended by Danish diplomat, Frances Christian Sehested and the nobles Johan Sack and Gustaf Jacob Horn. On 7 March 1735, Wrede-Sparre's brother-in-law Carl Gustaf Tessin would be initiated into the lodge. From there many other Swedish nobles would be initiated.

== Personal life, titles, and death ==
Christina Margareta Augusta Törnflycht, painted by Gustaf Lundberg

Wrede-Sparre married Christina Margareta Augusta Törnflycht on 5 October 1735. She was the daughter of Olof Törnflycht, a nobleman and privy councillor. The marriage produced six children.

- Ulrika Sofia Wrede-Sparre (21 July 1736 – 1 August 1765), married Baron Carl Adlerfelt.
- Carl Axel Sigge Wrede-Sparre (1 March 1738 – 11 July 1759), died unmarried in French service due to wounds sustained at the Battle of Bergen.
- Erik Wrede-Sparre (3 August 1739 – 5 May 1748).
- Brita Christina Wrede-Sparre (11 January 1741 – 27 May 1766), married Baron Fredrik Sparre.
- Lovisa Augusta Wrede-Sparre (12 September 1745 – 16 September 1817), married Count Johan August Meijerfeldt the Younger.

Wrede-Sparre was the Count of Sundby and Östanå. In addition to these titles, he was the Lord of Fånö, Nynäs, and, Åkerö.

Wrede-Sparre died in Stockholm on 19 January 1772 (recorded in one source as 29 January 1772). His death marked the end of the comital line Sparre af Sundby on the male ("sword") side. At his burial, his family coat of arms was ceremonially crushed by the governor, Baron Daniel Tilas.

== See also ==
- Freemasonry in Sweden
