= Ulla von Höpken =

Swedish countess and courtier

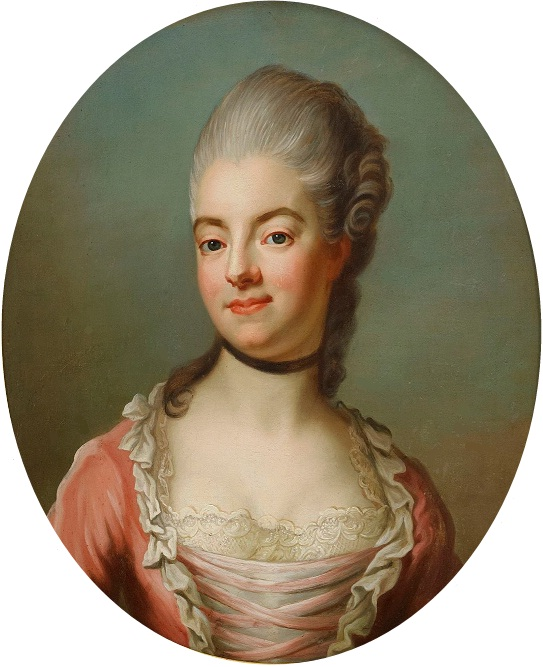
- Ulla von Höpken
- Born: Ulrika Eleonora von Fersen; 24 March 1749; Sweden
- Died: 17 September 1810 (aged 61); Frötuna, Sweden
- Other names: Ulla von Fersen, Ulla von Wright
- Occupation: Lady in waiting
- Known for: One of "The Three Graces", for her love life, and as a source of inspiration in culture and literature

Ulrika Eleonora "Ulla" von Höpken (née von Fersen; later von Wright; 24 March 1749 – 17 September 1810), was a Swedish countess and courtier. She is also famous in history as one of "the three graces" of the Gustavian age; three ladies-in-waiting (Augusta von Fersen, von Höpken and Louise Meijerfeldt) immortalized in the poem "Gracernas döpelse" by Johan Henric Kellgren. She was a leading socialite and trendsetter in contemporary Sweden, and one of the best known personalities of the Gustavian age.

== Biography ==
=== Early life ===
Ulrika Eleonora "Ulla" von Fersen was one of six daughters of Count Carl Reinhold von Fersen, royal Crown Forester and Charlotta Sparre, a lady-in-waiting. She was the niece of Axel von Fersen the Elder, a leading force within the Caps political party, and a cousin of the famous Count Axel von Fersen the Younger, a friend of Queen Marie Antoinette of France. Her father was described as "one of the most elegant and spirited gentlemen of his time", and her mother was celebrated for her beauty at the French royal court of Versailles, when she accompanied her aunt and uncle, Ulla Tessin and Count Carl Gustaf Tessin when he was the Swedish ambassador to France.

Both of her parents spent their life in service at the royal Swedish court, and Ulla von Fersen, as well as her sisters, served as hovfröken (maids of honour) prior to her marriage. From 1767 to 1770, she served as hovfröken to the Crown Princess, Sophia Magdalena of Denmark.

=== Love affair with Prince Frederick ===
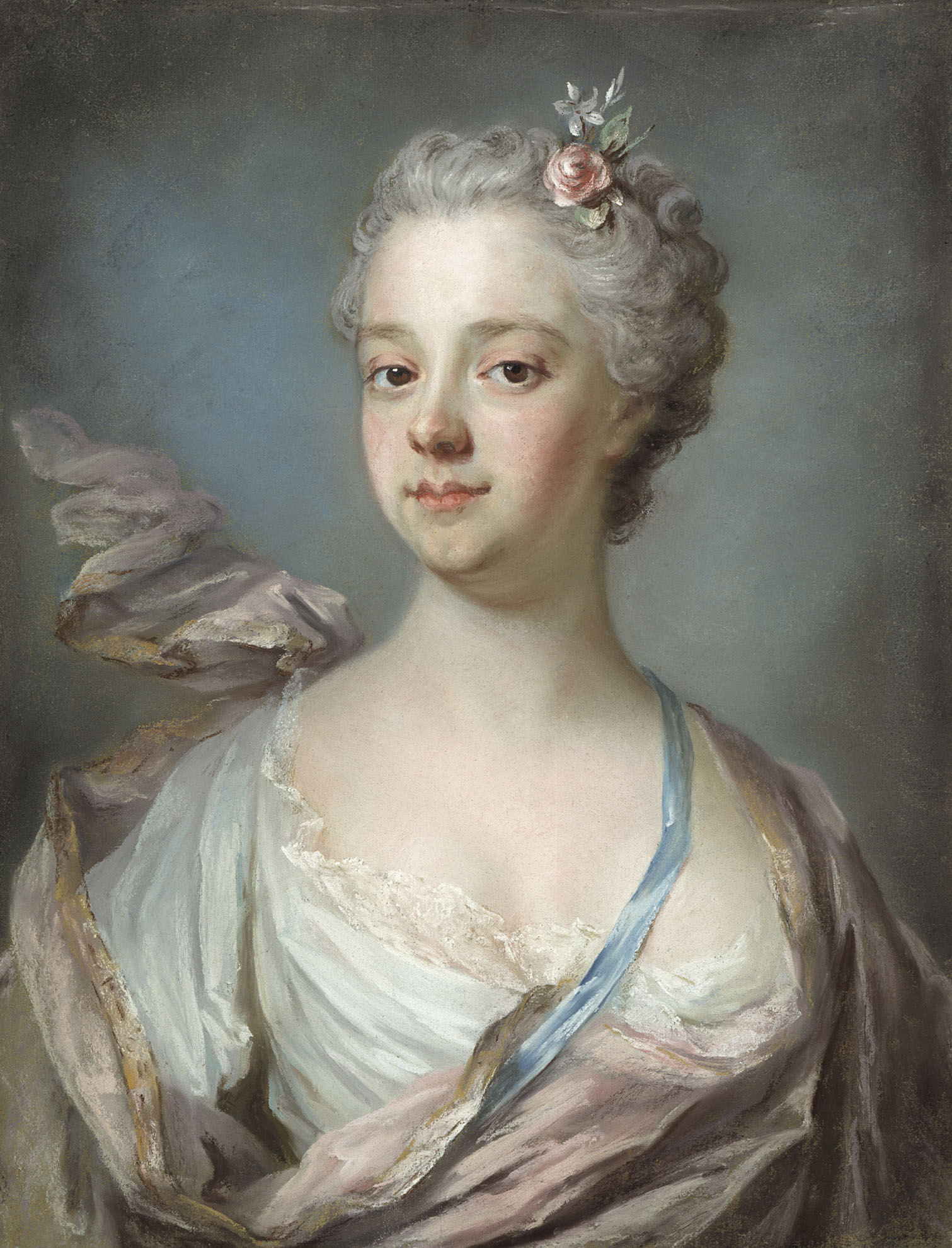
Ulrika Eleonora von Fersen

In 1767, Prince Frederick Adolf of Sweden fell in love with Ulla. At the same time, Prince Charles courted another lady-in-waiting, Brita Horn.

This is mentioned in the memoirs of courtier Adolf Ludvig Hamilton from 1767, when he mentioned the love of the princes for "the maids of honour Brita Horn and Ulrika Fersen. Prince Charles' love for the first, Prince Frederick's for the second, were both adjusted to the character of the two ladies. Miss Horn was blond, virtuous, sometimes cold, sometimes tender. She had almost made passion of her influence. Miss Fersen, funny, jolly, happy, capricious, considered the whole affair as a pastime which flattered her confidence and left it at that". Hamilton described a scene at Kina slott that summer: "In one corner, the Queen discussed politics, in another, the King talked about the hay- and oat prices with his equerry, the Crown Prince about fashion and France with Countess Ribbing (born Löwen). Prince Frederick bickered with his beauty (Ulla Fersen), prince Charles stood faithfully by his (Brita Horn), but in silence. The Crown Princess stood changing feet in boredom – the rest of the court yawned or slept." Neither of the affairs were, as far as it is known, sexually consummated, and neither Horn nor von Fersen became royal mistresses.

Both couples exchanged rings as a token of an unofficial engagement with the intent to marry. Prince Frederick Adolf proposed to Ulla in the garden at Drottningholm Palace, and "she laughed and accepted without a moments doubt, amused and flattered. She laughed still when he suggested that they exchanged rings, and was not more serious when he began to shower her with jewels and gifts".

In both cases, the royal family was opposed to the love matches. However, while the family of Brita Horn supported a marriage between Prince Charles and Brita, the family of Ulla opposed her marriage to Prince Frederick. Her family was convinced that a royal marriage would be a mistake and refused to permit it. The desired love matches of the princes came to be used by the political parties during the Riksdag of 1769 following the December Crisis (1768). The Caps (party), supported by the family of Brita Horn, promised Prince Charles the support of his love marriage to Brita Horn from the Riksdag against the will of the royal house in exchange for his support. As a counterattack, the Hats (party) made a similar offer to Prince Frederick: that her marriage to Ulla would be made possible. This caused a crisis. However, the family of Ulla refused to cooperate with the Hats (party) as they did not wish the marriage to take place, and in 1770, they married Ulla off.

The family of Ulla forced her to return the ring and presents to the prince and decided that the next proposal to her would be accepted. To avoid a royal match, her family organized a marriage with Baron Nils von Höpken (1750–1780), cavalry captain of the Scanian cavalry, a man described as a great beauty who was almost ruined by gambling and spending. While the marriage was not entirely arranged, her family encouraged Nils von Höpken as a suitor because he was beautiful and was expected to be able to make Ulla fall in love with him, which she did.

Ulla and Nils von Höpken married in 1770. Prince Frederick was sent on a journey abroad, and when returned one year later, he fell in love with Ulla's cousin, Sophie Piper.

=== One of the Three Graces ===
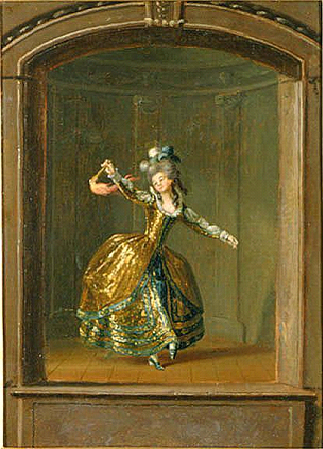
Ulrika Eleonora von Fersen in the amateur theatre of Gustav III.

Initially, the marriage between von Höpken and her spouse was happy and passionate. It was said that they were indifferent to their economic problems as long as they had a bed, and they were likened to Amor and Psyche. They had a daughter, Ulrika Sofia Albertina von Höpken (born and died 1772). However, her husband suffered from a problem with drinking and gambling, and in 1773, they separated after he had subjected her to spousal abuse out of jealousy. After this, they lived separate lives: he spent his time drinking and gambling, and she in "pleasing others".

Ulla von Höpken returned to the royal court, where she served as statsfru (Lady of the Bedchamber) to Queen Sophia Magdalena from 1775 to 1795.

During her stay in Paris, her mother had studied dance under Marie Sallé and in turn instructed her daughters, who became known for their grace and talent within dance in the amateur theatre in the court of Gustav III. The most talented participators within the famous amateur court theater of Gustav III were Caroline Lewenhaupt, Carl von Fersen, Hedvig Ulrika De la Gardie, Nils Barck, Maria Aurora Uggla, Otto Jacob von Manteuffel Zöge, Bror Cederström and the sisters Ulla von Höpken and Augusta von Fersen.

Ulla von Höpken was a fashion icon and aroused attention by her way of dress – she sometime dressed as a man in trousers to provoke, such as when she on one occasion dressed as a page boy with trousers of leather, boots and spurs.

Foremost, Ulla von Höpken is famous for her love life. She has sometime been identified as a symbol of the frivolous sexual liberty of the 18th-century aristocracy, and it was said in 1782 that "the Aphrodite of the epoch rule as sovereign in the figure of Ulla Höpken". Von Höpken had two more children after having separated from her spouse, Nils von Höpken (1774–1829) and Augusta Lovisa von Höpken (1775–1801). In 1778, she was noted to have baron Evert Vilhelm Taube af Odenkat as a lover, whom she shared with Ulrika Eleonora Örnsköld. The same year, she was the subject of a scandal when love letters purporting to be from her circulated, in which she apparently invited several men to join her on the same occasion. In 1781, she was the target of another scandal, when the caricature Lisimons was written by the courtiers to describe her relationship with her three lovers; the three actual men in question was thereafter referred to as her "lisimons". From about 1781 onward, however, von Höpken had a serious and permanent long-term relationship with "a beautiful page", the younger Georg Jonas von Wright, who was her lover for the rest of her life and whom she eventually married.

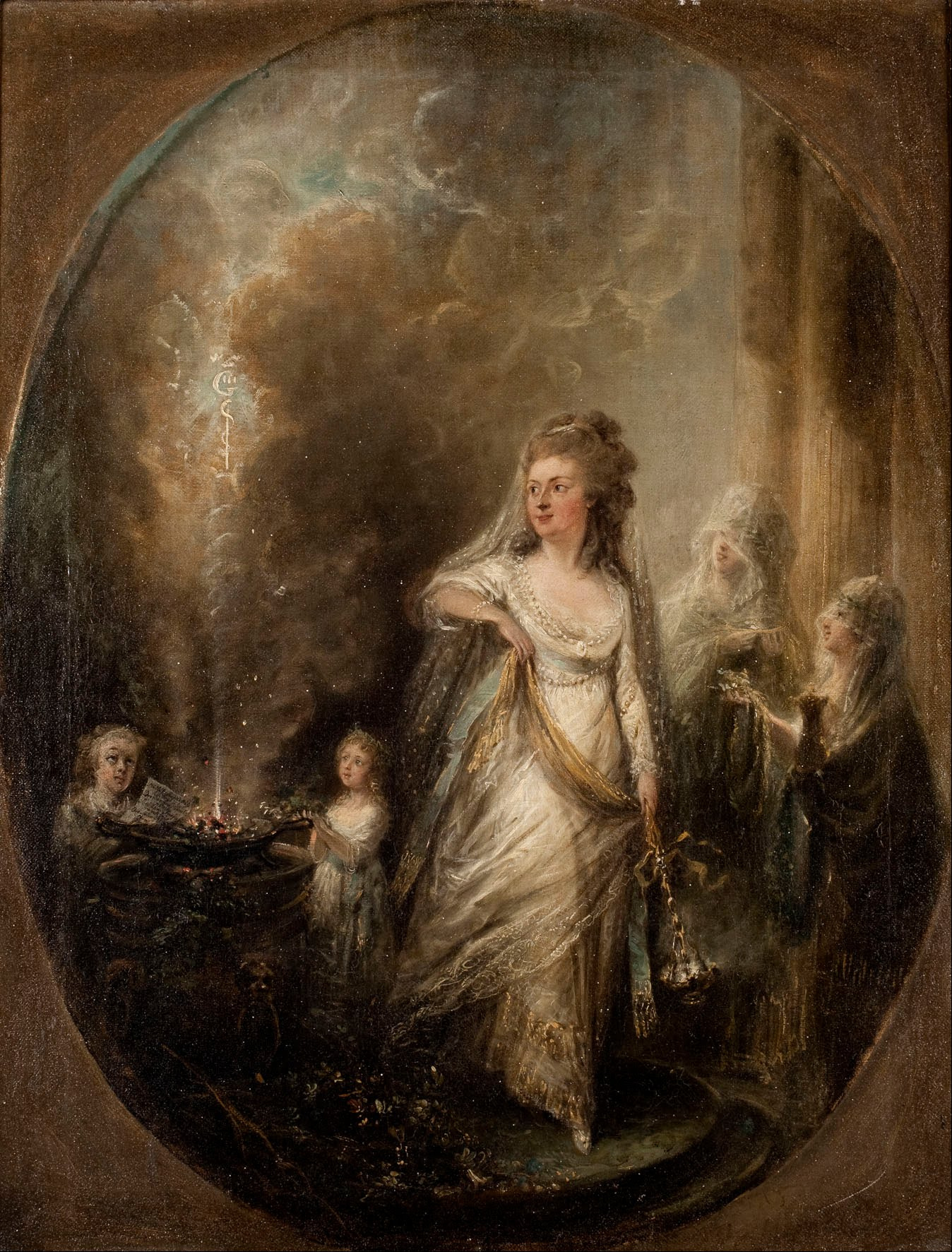
Elias Martin: Ulla von Höpken's sacrifice to Asclepius

Von Höpken was a close platonic friend and confidant of king Gustav III, and it was noted that they enjoyed speaking with each other as if they were flirting. Gustav III once said to her: "Well Ulla, you and me are surely friends for ever and will never leave each other", upon which she answered: "Thank you very much, I have had one unhappy marriage already and that is quite enough." In the summer 1780, von Höpken was again the subject of a scandal when her estranged husband left his regiment in Skåne without permission and publicly stated that he wished to join his wife and expected to be housed in her apartment at Gripsholm Castle. After an appeal to the king, her husband was forcibly stopped on his way toward the royal court by an order of the monarch that he was to be returned to his regiment by force and arrested if necessary.

Her position as a favorite and personal confidante of the monarch was disturbed by a conflict with the rising favorite Gustaf Mauritz Armfelt in 1782, who slandered her before the King as vengeance after she herself had made a negative judgement about him. This was repaired, however, and as late as in 1788, she was mentioned as one who had the privilege to speak completely openly to the monarch about anything, including political affairs. Count Claes Julius Ekeblad, who compared her and her life to that of an actress in a comedy play, noted in his correspondence to Brita Horn that von Höpken were "likely the cause of many greater events, both in high society as well as in matters of greater importance."

=== Later life ===
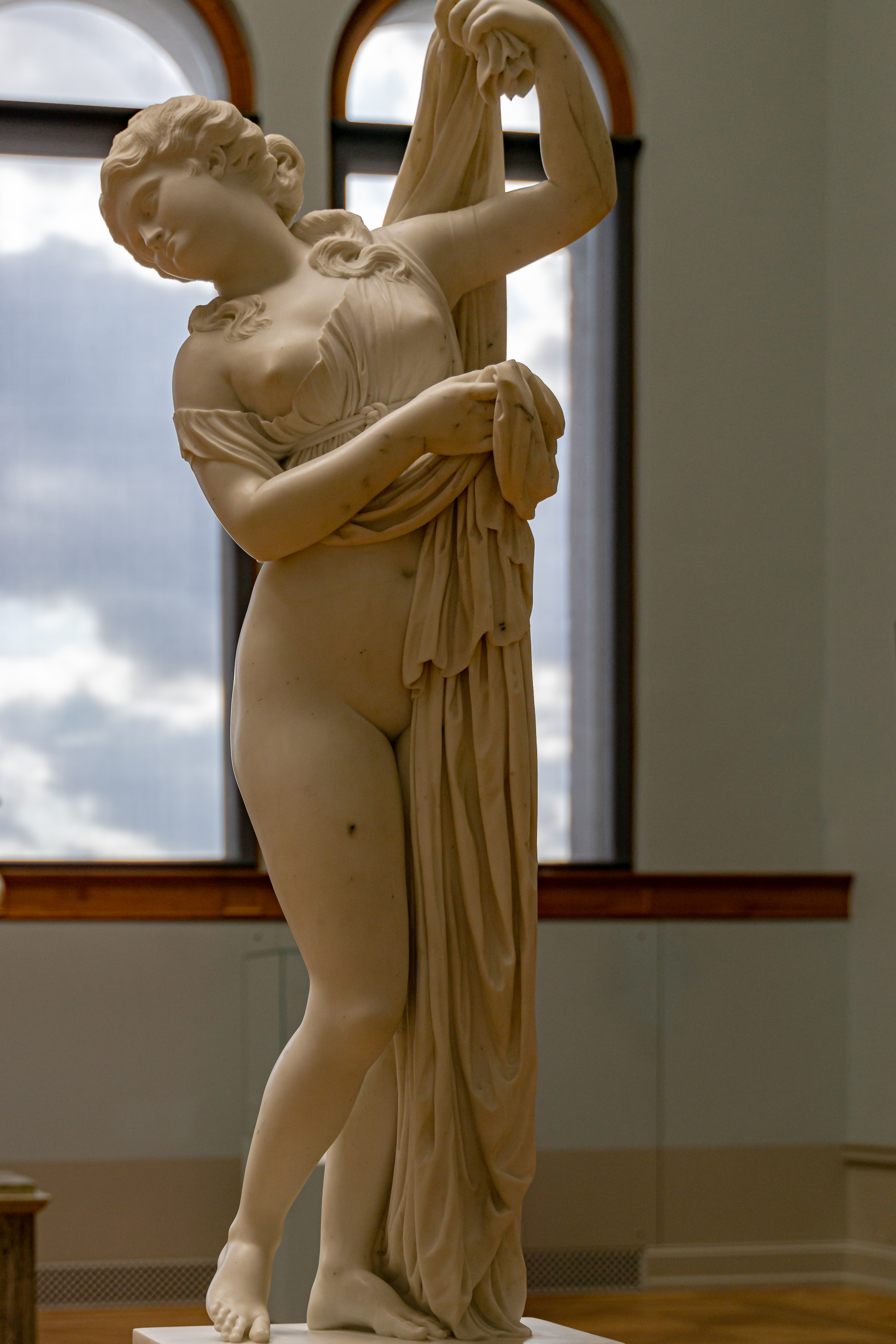
Aphrodite Kallipygos or Venus aux belles fesses (1779) by Johan Tobias Sergel, which was ordered by Gustav III and used Ulla von Höpken as a model. Nationalmuseum.

After the Riksdag of the Estates of 1789, when Gustav III came in conflict with the nobility, he arrested her uncle Axel von Fersen the Elder as a leader of the aristocratic opposition to the Union and Security Act and the Russo-Swedish War (1788–90). This caused a break in the relation between Gustav III and von Höpken, who joined the demonstration of Jeanna von Lantingshausen.

In 1795, her mother, chief lady in waiting to queen Sophia Magdalena although bedridden, was relieved from her position, and her daughters Ulla and Augusta simultaneously left their positions at court in solidarity, officially to tend to their mother's health. Her mother died later that same year. In 1797, von Höpken married her "fateful admirer" and long term lover, the five years younger colonel Georg Jonas von Wright (1754–1800), and reportedly lived happy with him in Uppsala. After having been widowed, she lived with her sisters and "was commonly as respected for their charity as well as for their refined manner, which was primarily afforded those, who was formed by the court of Gustav III". Von Höpken died of cancer.

== Legacy ==
Alongside Augusta von Fersen and Louise Meijerfeldt, she became known as one of "the three graces" in the poem Gracernas döpelse (The baptism of the graces) by Johan Henric Kellgren, which was written in circa 1779 and published in 1781.

Von Höpken was the model of the naked Venus sculpture by Johan Tobias Sergel, Venus aux belles fesses (1779). King Gustav III wished to have a statue of Venus Kallipygos opposite his statue of Apollo in his salon, and "as a compliment to our ladies in waiting", von Höpken was chosen as the model of the statue's face, to "celebrate her fifteen years in the service of Venus". In the 18th-century, it was quite controversial for a woman of her social status to stand as the model of a nude statue, and count Claes Julius Ekeblad remarked: "Sergel has, of modesty or because uncle Axel has asked him to, not given this portrait all the likeness he could have, but nevertheless she is recognizable. I admit that I have never, despite all the disregard here shown toward gossip, imagined anything of the sort, to have a femme de qualité exposed to the entire world in this way." The statue was later placed in the National Museum of Fine Arts.

An 18-gun frigate of the Swedish Royal Navy, HSwMS Ulla Fersen was named after her. The frigate participated in the campaign of 1790 and the Battle of Reval. In March 1801 the ship was detained by the British Royal Navy while on passage to the Swedish colony Saint Barthelemy, but was released after negotiations. She was wrecked in 1807.

=== Fiction ===
Von Höpken is the subject of the novel Venus i rokoko; en roman om Ulla von Fersen (Roccoco Venus; a novel of Ulla von Fersen) by Ole Söderström (1960). The novel gives a relatively correct fictionalized account of her life until she enters into her lifelong love story with Georg Jonas von Wright. It also includes speculation that Gustav III at one point unsuccessfully attempts to have a sexual relationship with von Höpken, but fails, because of his homosexuality.

Von Höpken has also been suggested as a role model for Bellman's character Ulla Winblad in her "aristocratic version".

== See also ==
- Anna Charlotta Schröderheim
