= Louise Meijerfeldt =

Swedish noble and courtier

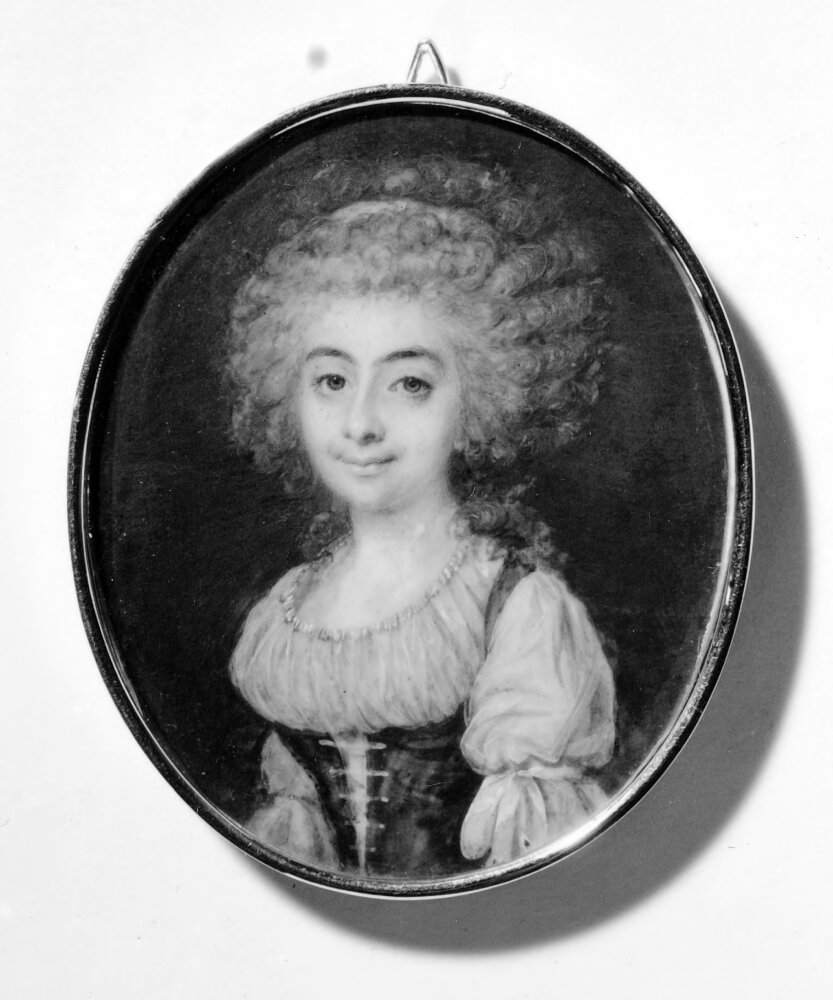
- Known for: one of "the three graces"
- Born: 12 September 1745
- Died: 16 September 1817 (aged 72)

Lovisa Augusta "Louise" Meijerfeldt (née Wrede-Sparre af Sundby; 12 September 1745 – 16 September 1817), was a Swedish noble and courtier. She is famous in history as one of "the three graces" of the Gustavian age; three ladies-in-waiting (Augusta von Fersen, Ulla von Höpken and Louise Meijerfeldt) immortalized in the poem "Gracernas döpelse" by Johan Henric Kellgren, and known profiles of the epoch.

== Life ==
Louise Meijerfeldt was the daughter of Governor general major Count Axel Wrede-Sparre and Augusta Törnflycht. In 1763, she married Field marshal Count Johan August Meijerfeldt the Younger (1725–1800) in the presence of King Adolph Frederick of Sweden and queen Louisa Ulrika. She had two children, both of them male.

The couple were well seen by the royal house – her spouse had been entrusted by the queen during the Coup of 1756 – and given a prominent position at court. From 1776 to 1795, she served as statsfru (Lady of the Bedchamber) to queen Sophia Magdalena.

Louise Meijerfeldt was admired for her beauty and charm and often mentioned in diaries, letters and memoirs of the era. Alongside Augusta von Fersen and Ulla von Höpken, she became known as one of "the three graces" in the poem "Gracernas döpelse" (The baptism of the graces) by Johan Henric Kellgren, which was written in circa 1779 and published in 1781. Kellgren had been employed as the private teacher of her sons from 1777 to 1780. The poet Johan Gabriel Oxenstierna, once the governor of her two sons, referred to her as: "a beauty, whom the old world would have worshipped on their knees as Diana and Venus".

Duchess Charlotte give her the following characterization in her famous journal: "She is very witty and educated but quite mean and only amusing when she can make fun of some one, which she seldom refrain from doing, and this makes her unreliable and heartless. She is regarded as quite much disposed for love adventures, although she has a great ability to conceal them; at present, however, she has not managed to do so, because her lover has the same sense of humor as she does, and their common weakness has exposed them. People hungry for scandals wish to claim that it is not so much inclination that attaches her to her lovers as it is the presents they give her. I admit that I do not believe such a vile accusation, and generally I do not believe half of what people are saying, for at present every one in Stockholm is terribly mean. The one presently enjoying the affection of countess Meyerfelt is a colonel lieutenant baron Ehrensvärd, who are especially witty but quite mean. He was previously well seen by the King, but has fallen from grace since the last Assembly of the estates, where he proved himself to be too talkative."

Louise Meijerfeldt was known for her love life and among her lovers were the Spanish envoy count de Lacy, the French envoy Pierre Chrysostème Dusson de Bonnac (1774), field marshal Fredrik Vilhelm von Hessenstein (1774) and governor baron Carl Sparre (1777). Her spouse was described as both ugly and boring, but reportedly, they lived harmoniously with each other, and it was said that she used to inform him about the compliments given to her by her lovers.

Louise Meijerfeldt died in Stockholm in 1817, aged 72.
