= Hans Henric von Essen =

Swedish field marshal and statesman (1855–1824)

Count Hans Henric von Essen
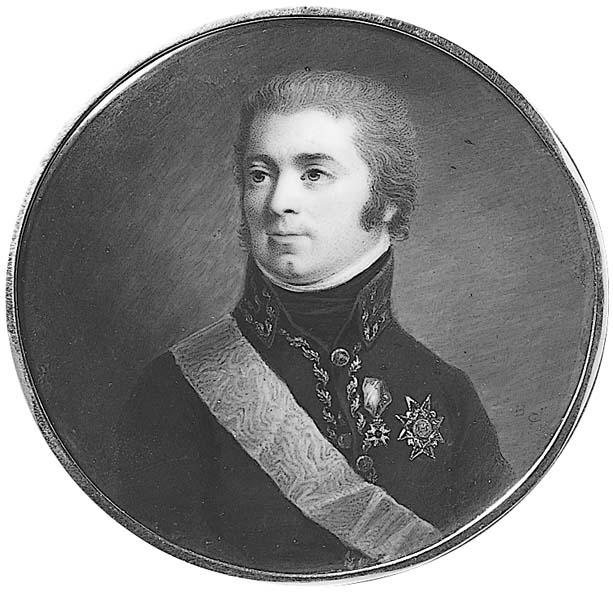
- Portrait by Johan Erik Bolinder, c. 1800
- Born: 26 September 1755; Kavlås Castle, Sweden
- Died: 28 June 1824 (aged 68)
- Military career
- Allegiance: Kingdom of Sweden
- Branch: Swedish Army
- Service years: c. 1773–1810
- Rank: Field marshal
- Other work: Governor of Stockholm; Governor-General of Pomerania

Count Hans Henric von Essen (26 September 1755 – 28 June 1824) was a Swedish officer, courtier and statesman.

== Biography ==
Hans Henric von Essen was born at Kavlås Castle in Tidaholm Municipality, Västra Götaland County, Sweden. He was a member of the Essen family. He was educated at Uppsala University. He entered the army, becoming a cornet at age 18. He accompanied Gustav III in his travels and campaigns. He accompanied Gustav III at the 1792 masquerade ball at the Royal Opera House in Stockholm on 16 March 1792, where the king was shot and mortally injured. Hans Henrik von Essen was credited with immediately ordering the doors to the ballroom to be locked, in order not to let the assassin getaway.

In 1788, Hans Henric von Essen was the center of a scandal at the royal court. He had for about ten years been involved in a relationship with the famous lady-in-waiting Augusta von Fersen. In 1788, however, he proposed to Charlotta Eleonora De Geer (1771–1791) and was accepted. His proposal was met with great dislike within the royal court because of sympathy with the popular Augusta von Fersen, and he was challenged to a duel by captain count Adolph Ribbing. Ribbing had also proposed to De Geer but had been declined by her father, which he refused to accept as he believed he had reasons to think that De Geer preferred him and that Essen had proposed because of economic reasons, as De Geer was very wealthy, and as von Essen's proposal and marriage plans were commonly disliked within the court. The duel took place in the royal riding house in the presence of several officers and led to the defeat of von Essen, who was slightly injured. The duel was regarded as a scandal and a crime against the King.

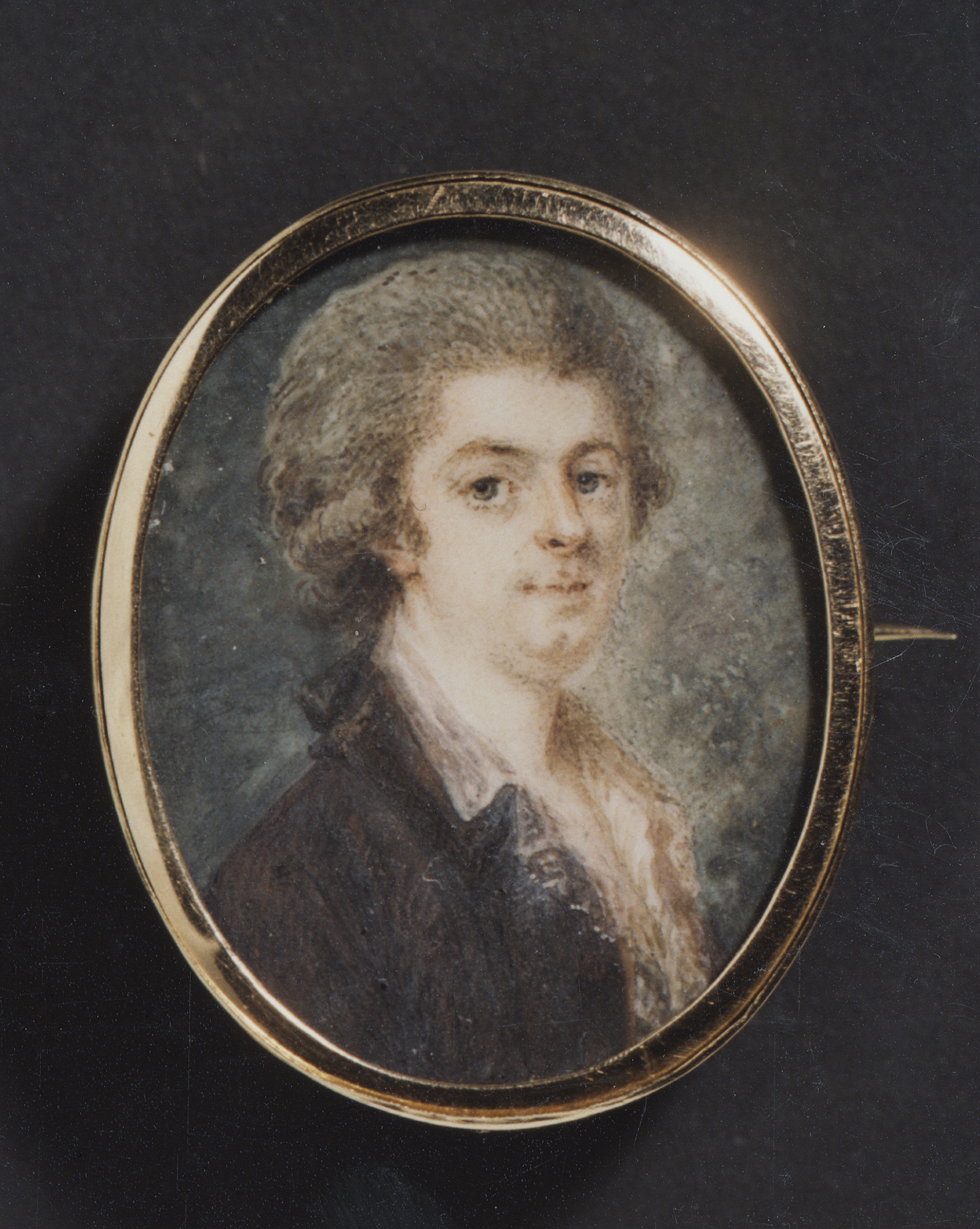
Hans Henrik von Essen, portrait miniature by Anton Ulrik Berndes

Hans Henrik von Essen was appointed Colonel in 1787, Major General in 1795, and Field Marshal in 1811. He served as the Governor of Stockholm from 1795 to 1797 and as the Governor-General of Pomerania from 1800 to 1809. Upon the revolution of 1809, he received the title of count and a place in the Council of State. In 1810 he was sent as Ambassador to Paris by Charles XIII, and his negotiations with Napoleon's ministers restored Pomerania to Sweden.

== See also ==
- List of Swedish field marshals
- Norway in 1814

== Notes ==
Preceded by Christian Frederick	Governor-general of Norway; 1814–1816	Succeeded by Carl Carlsson Mörner
