= Sparr =

Sparr refers to:

- Sparr, Florida, a town in the United States
- Sparr, Michigan, an unincorporated community
- Otto Christoph von Sparr (1599 or 1605–1668), Field Marshal of Brandenburg-Prussia
- Lord Sparr, character in the book series The Secrets of Droon
- Sparr, a type of Irish axe used by Galloglass

== See also ==
- Sparre
