= Eva Löwen =

Swedish countess and royal favorite (1743–1813)

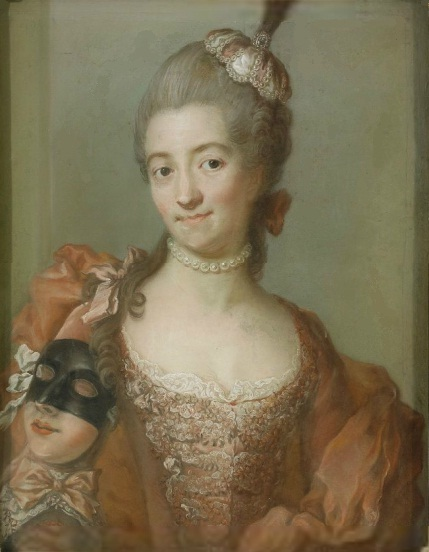
- Eva Helena Löwen
- Born: 15 December 1743
- Died: 16 January 1813 (aged 69)
- Other names: Eva Helena Ribbing
- Spouses: Count Fredrik Ribbing; Baron Gustaf Macklean
- Children: Adolph Ribbing

Eva Helena Löwen (15 December 1743 – 16 January 1813), was a politically active Swedish countess and royal favorite. She was active as a French agent in Sweden.

== Biography ==
Eva Löwen was the daughter of Axel Löwen and Eva Horn af Ekebyholm and the grandchild of Arvid Horn, and the great grandchild of Christina Piper. She married Count Fredrik Ribbing (1721-1783) in 1764, and became the mother of Adolph Ribbing.

=== Court life ===
Never formally a lady in waiting, she had a favored position at court and was a friend of Queen Louisa Ulrika. In February 1768, it was noted that Charlotte Du Rietz and Eva Löwen flirted with Crown Prince Gustav and seduced him. After the relationship with Du Rietz ended in October 1768, Gustav suggested a love affair to Eva Löwen, who declined saying she could love him, she could not come between him and her own future Queen.

Löwen is confirmed as an agent employed by the French state. She is one of the confirmed names mentioned on a list from the last years of the Age of Liberty, consistent of influential Swedish citizens who received secret allowances from the French Crown in exchange for using their influence to lobby French interests in Swedish politics. Her French allowance consisted of a third of the salary paid to a Swedish member of parliament of this period, and almost equal to that of the President of Svea Hovrätt. Nine names are identified on the list, of which three were women. Another female agent was Christina Sofia Bielke, the mother of Magdalena Rudenschöld: women were often financed to hold salons to benefit French interests.

After the revolution of 1772 performed by Gustav III of Sweden, which was in effect a victory for French interests in Sweden, Eva Löwen was favored by the king and enjoyed a platonic friendship with the monarch: she could be seen visiting the Royal Swedish Opera in the royal box and regularly chosen to sit at the side of the king during suppers, and it was noted that they often discussed France and all things French together. In 1778, a break occurred between Eva Löwen and Gustav III when she was pointed out as one of the instigators behind the rumor that the king had asked Adolph Fredrik Munk af Fulkila to impregnate the queen and that Munck was consequently the father of the father the Crown Prince: the queen dowager supported this hypothesis, and Löwen took the side of the queen dowager against the king during the scandal, which caused her to fall out of favor with Gustav III. A partial reconciliation followed two years later.

=== Socialite ===
Eva Löwen was a leading figure of Stockholm aristocratic and royal society life, described as a celebrated beauty, the capital's “Queen of fashion” and talked about for her love adventures. It is mentioned, how various clothing attires such as a specific model of a cap became fashionable after having been worn by her. Johan Fischerström said of her that she "has good sense and sweet judgments; pleasing ways and are created for the life at court".

In 1767, she became the subject of a scandal when her spouse, after having been told by a footman, returned home to find her with her lover, the French envoy Louis Auguste Le Tonnelier de Breteuil, who was forced to bribe the servants to be able to flee the scene. In 1772, she had a relationship with count Axel von Fersen the Elder, who was in 1774 replaced by his son, count Axel von Fersen the Younger, and then with the French envoy count Claude Bigot de Sainte-Croix, whom she shared with Sophie Piper. Count Claes Julius Ekeblad described the affair between Eva Löwen and Axel von Fersen the Younger to Brita Horn in 1774: "He loves her passionately. But his thoughtlessness and childishness makes her insecure enough for her entire coquetry to become unhinged. He is a true Lindor, whom you must forgive everything, and I do believe, that she does."

In 1788, her son Adolph Ribbing fall out of favor with the monarch because of a scandalous duel with Hans Henric von Essen, and came to belong to the opposition of the king. In 1792, he belonged to the participators of the regicide of Gustav III, and lived for the rest of his life in exile. The whole affair of her son's involvement in the regicide reportedly affected her deeply, and she continued to support him financially. By that time widowed for thirteen years, she married Baron Gustaf Macklean (1744-1804), who had been her lover for twelve years, in 1796.

== See also ==
- Hedvig Catharina Lillie
