= Augusta Löwenhielm =

Swedish noblewoman and courtier (1754–1846)

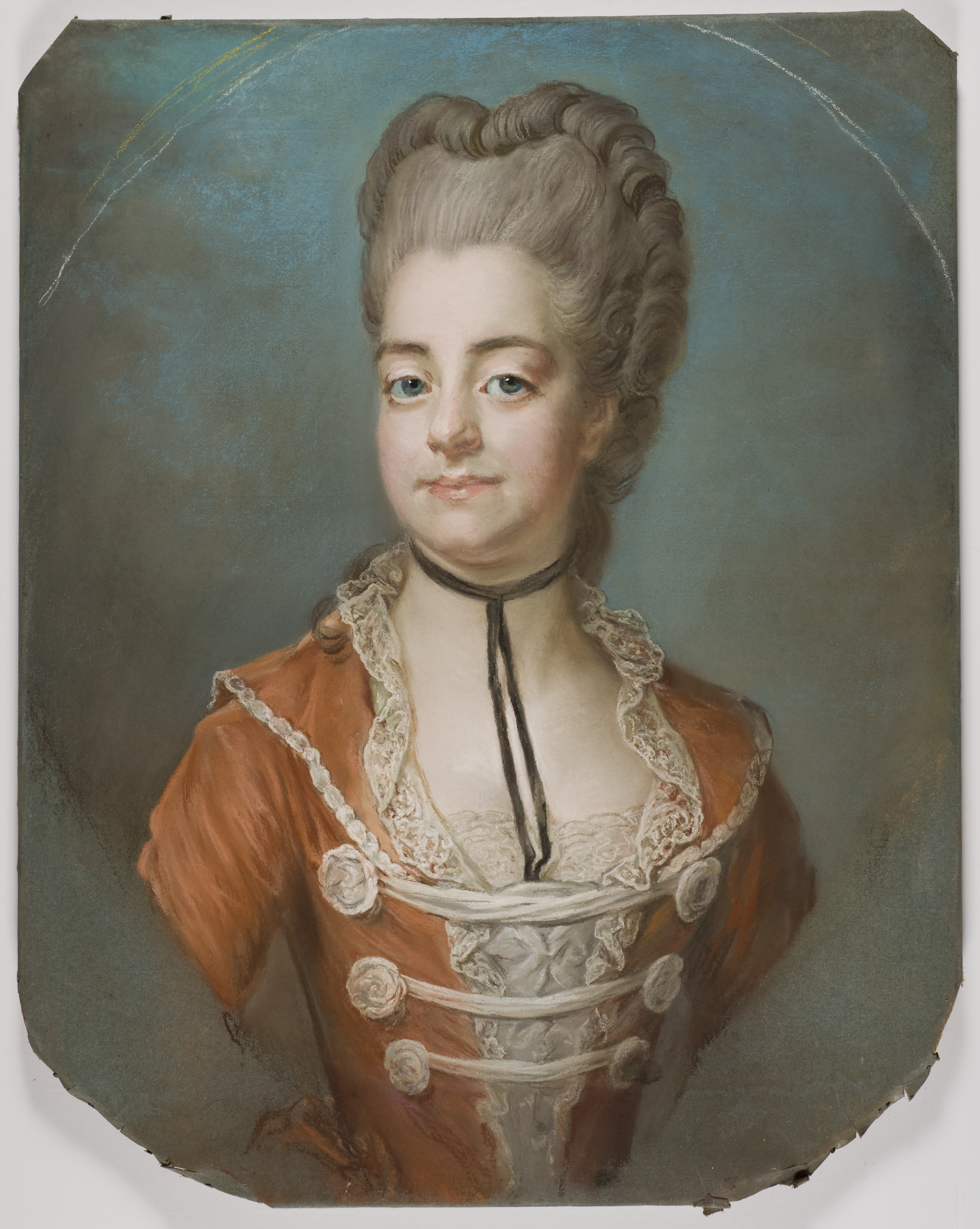
- Augusta Löwenhielm
- Born: Christina Augusta von Fersen; 10 March 1754; Sweden
- Died: 8 April 1846 (aged 92); Stockholm, Sweden
- Other names: Augusta Löwenhielm
- Occupation: Lady in waiting
- Known for: Her relationship to Charles XIII of Sweden; for being one of "The three graces", for her love life, and as a source of inspiration in culture and literature

Countess Christina Augusta Löwenhielm (née von Fersen; 10 March 1754 – 8 April 1846), was a Swedish noblewoman and courtier. She is known for her love affair with the future king Charles XIII. She is also famous in history as one of "the three graces" of the Gustavian age; three ladies-in-waiting (Augusta von Fersen, Ulla von Höpken and Louise Meijerfeldt) immortalized in the poem Gracernas döpelse by Johan Henric Kellgren, and known profiles of the epoch.

== Life ==
=== Early life ===
Augusta von Fersen was one of six daughters of the royal Crown Forester count Carl Reinhold von Fersen and the lady-in-waiting Charlotta Sparre. She was as such also the niece of Axel von Fersen the Elder, a leading force within the Caps, and the cousin of the famous Count Axel von Fersen the Younger. Her father was described as "one of the most elegant and spirited gentlemen of his time", and her mother was celebrated for her beauty at the French royal court of Versailles, when she accompanied her aunt and uncle by marriage, Ulla Tessin and the Swedish ambassador to France count Carl Gustaf Tessin, to France.

Both her parents spent their life in service at the royal Swedish court, and Augusta von Fersen, as well as her sisters, served as hovfröken (maid of honour) prior to her marriage. In December 1770, she married count Fredrik Adolf Löwenhielm (1743-1810). After their wedding, the couple settled in the country estate of her spouse for a while. They had one son.

=== Love affair with Duke Charles ===
During the 1771 winter social season in Stockholm, Augusta Löwenhielm was courted by prince Charles, who had recently returned to Sweden after having been sent abroad to separate him from Brita Horn. Prince Charles reportedly fell in love with her, she eventually reciprocated, and the relationship that followed has been described as "the most serious and tender in his [Charles'] erotic chronicle". The couple had a son, Carl Axel Löwenhielm. The relationship was well known as accepted, but she was not an official royal mistress; the relationship was rather treated as equal to the other extramarital love affairs which was at that time accepted in the circles of the nobility and royal court.

In 1774, king Gustav III convinced his brother duke Charles to agree to a dynastic marriage with Hedvig Elisabeth Charlotte of Holstein-Gottorp. The purpose of the marriage was to produce an heir to the throne, because the marriage of the king to Sophia Magdalena of Denmark was unconsummated and childless. On 6 April 1774, the spouse of Augusta Löwenhielm was appointed Swedish envoy to Dresden and departed for Saxony. Augusta Löwenhielm remained in Sweden until she was explicitly ordered by the monarch to join her spouse in Dresden prior to the wedding of Charles. She remained in Dresden during the wedding of Charles in July and the arrival of his bride Charlotte in Sweden, but she kept in contact with Charles through secret correspondence.

Augusta Löwenhielm was allowed to return to Sweden after the strange affair of the pregnancy of duchess Charlotte. In the end of July 1775, an official proclamation was made stating that duchess Charlotte was pregnant. Charlotte, who initially denied being pregnant, soon herself claimed to have felt the fetus move. However, no signs of pregnancy was visible. On 14 September, Charlotte was examined again, and this time, the pregnancy was announced to have been surely assured. The date of the expected birth was given as 24 October, and preparations was made for the official customary rituals association with a royal birth. However, on 24 October, all preparations was suddenly cancelled without explanation. It is unknown whether the whole affair was a deliberate deceit and, in that case, who was responsible, and why. At the time, there was a rumor that it was in fact the king who had invented the pregnancy. The reason was that he had decided to consummate his own marriage and provide and heir to the throne by himself rather than to leave this task to his brother, and that he wished to make duchess Charlotte sexually unavailable and direct the sexual interest of his brother elsewhere to avoid any legitimate offspring of Charles. Adolf Ludvig Hamilton describes this rumor: "The king feared all influence of duke Charles upon the throne, also as the father of an heir to the throne. He found the affection between him and his young consort to be to great. The condition in question separated the prince from her, accustomed him to others, a habit he has since then never abandoned, and the purpose being achieved the monarch saw that the ridicule would affect no one but the spouses. All this was successful." During the summer of 1775, the king himself did consummate his marriage with the assistance of Adolf Fredrik Munck, and duke Charles, who had a temporary affair with countess Hedvig Amalia Lewenhaupt, asked the king for permission for Augusta Löwenhielm to return to Sweden, which was granted.

Augusta Löwenhielm, who was rumored to have had an affair with Charles of Saxony, Duke of Courland while in Dresden, returned to Sweden in the autumn of 1776 and officially returned to the royal court, where she was introduced to duchess Charlotte, on 18 November 1776. The spouse of Charles, Duchess Charlotte, describes the incident in her famous journal: "She is with no doubt delightful, her facial features are pleasant, her appearance appealing, and dressed for ball, she is quite magnificent, thought perhaps somewhat stout. You should have seen how everyone looked at me, I did therefore attempt to appear indifferent, though I was really very curious." Duke Charles started to court her as soon as she returned, wishing to continue their affair, dividing the court in fractions who tried to encourage or discourage the affair, but Augusta Löwenhielm initially declined. Instead, she had a brief affair with baron Carl Adam Wachtmeister and with the Russian Prince Alexander Kurakin, who had been sent to Sweden by Catherine the Great to officially bring the news of the marriage of the Grand Duke. In December 1776, however, it was clear that the relationship between duke Charles and Augusta Löwenhielm had been resumed. The affair between duke Charles and Augusta Löwenhielm was discontinued in the summer of 1777. It was ended by Löwenhielm, reportedly because she had fallen in love with baron Hans Henric von Essen. One year later, von Essen had become her official lover, while duke Charles had entered into his relationship with Charlotte Slottsberg.

=== Court life ===
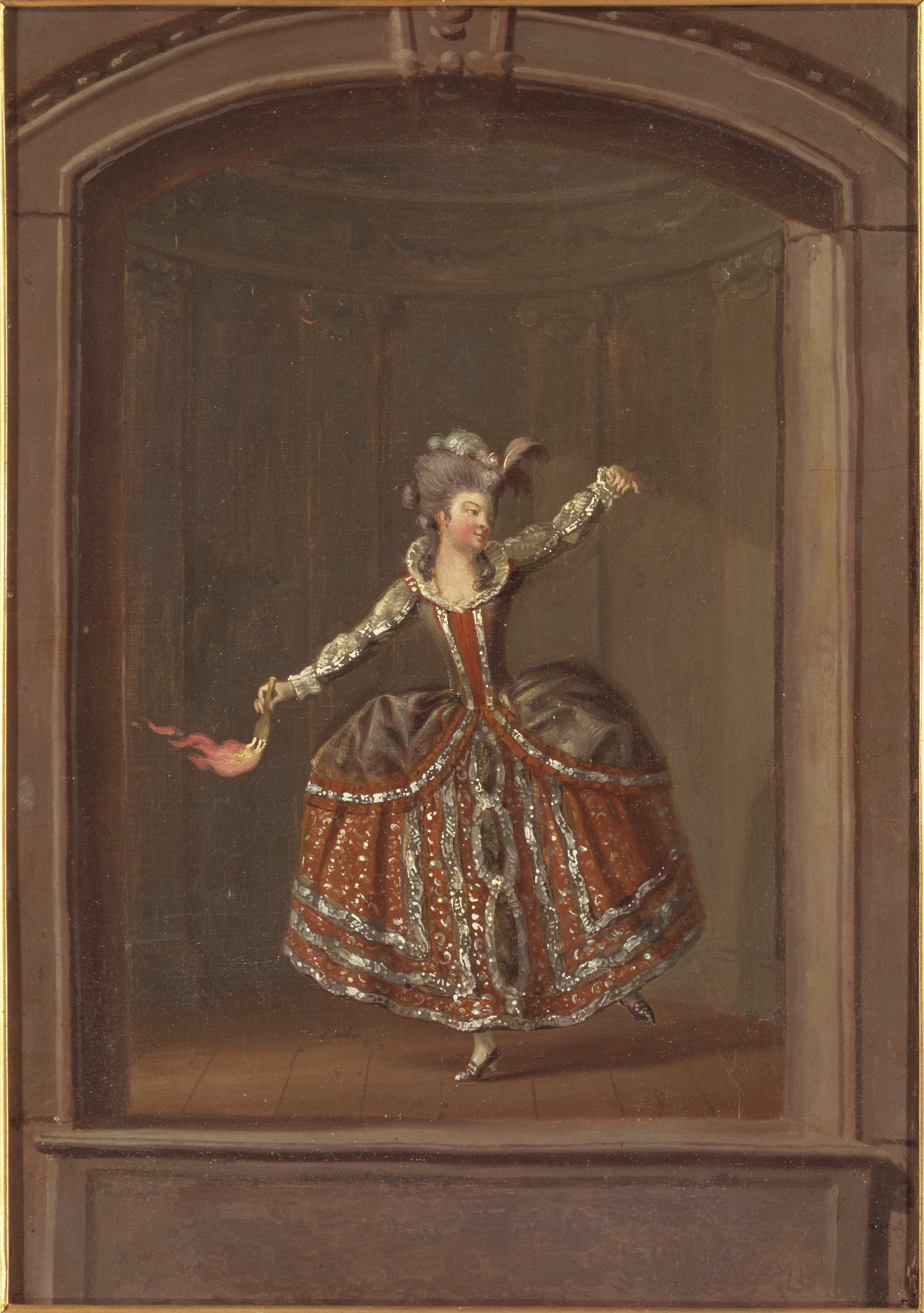
Augusta Löwenhielm in the amateur theater of Gustav III, by Pehr Hilleström.

From 1777 to 1795, Augusta Löwenhielm served as statsfru (Lady of the Bedchamber) to Queen Sophia Magdalena.

Alongside Ulla von Höpken and Louise Meijerfeldt, she became known as one of "the three graces" in the poem Gracernas döpelse (The Baptism of the Graces) by Johan Henric Kellgren, which was written in circa 1779 and published in 1781.

During her stay in Paris, her mother had studied dance under Marie Sallé and in turn instructed her daughters, who became known for their grace and talent within dance in the amateur theatre in the court of Gustav III. The most talented participators within the famous amateur court theater of Gustav III were Caroline Lewenhaupt, Carl von Fersen, Hedvig Ulrika De la Gardie, Nils Barck, Maria Aurora Uggla, Otto Jacob von Manteuffel Zöge, Bror Cederström and the sisters Ulla von Höpken and Augusta von Fersen.

Augusta Löwenhielm became known for her elegance, her good taste and her charm. Duchess Charlotte, the wife of Duke Charles, noted in her famous journal that Augusta did not have a bad effect on Charles, and that she was a kind person who, due to her tolerant attitude toward others, was also treated tolerantly herself: "As it happened the other day, Countess Löwenhielm was late at dinner and arrived a quarter of an hour after it had started, and unfortunately, Baron von Essen arrived at the same time. All of us aware of their relationship found it amusing, and some could not hide a smile." Ulla von Höpken remarked of the incident: "To think if something of that sort would happen to another poor soul - they would never hear the end of it. But my sister is always excused, and it can only be seen as proof of her open nature and her frankness to expose her relationship to that meek Essen for the world". Charlotte then replied: "She may not be more careful than others, but of a kind and goodhearted nature, she is friendly toward all and does not interfere in other people's business, which makes her less exposed to slander than most".

Augusta was indirectly involved in a scandalous duel. From 1778 until 1788, she had a permanent relationship with baron Hans Henric von Essen. In 1788, her lover, von Essen, proposed to the heiress Charlotta Eleonora De Geer (1771–1798) and was accepted. His proposal was met with great dislike within the royal court because of sympathy with the popular Augusta von Fersen, and he was challenged to a duel by his rival count Adolph Ribbing. Ribbing had also proposed to De Geer but had been declined by her father, which he refused to accept, as he believed he had reasons to think that De Geer preferred him and that Essen had proposed because of economic reasons, and because von Essen's proposal and marriage plans was commonly disliked within the court. The duel took place in the royal riding house in the presence of several officers and led to the defeat of von Essen, who was slightly injured. The duel was regarded as a scandal and a crime against the King The duel affair also caused great Ribbing to feel great animosity against the king, and he was later involved in the regicide against Gustav III.

After the Riksdag of the Estates of 1789, when Gustav III came in conflict with the nobility, he arrested her uncle Axel von Fersen the Elder as a leader of the aristocratic opposition to the Union and Security Act and the Russo-Swedish War (1788–90), but unlike many other female members of the nobility, she never joined the demonstration of Jeanna von Lantingshausen.

In 1795, her mother, chief lady in waiting to queen Sophia Magdalena although bedridden, was relieved from her position, and her daughters Ulla and Augusta simultaneously left their positions at court in solidarity, officially to tend to their mother's health. Her mother died later that same year. In 1799, she presented Lolotte Forssberg at court. Her last years were spent in religion and charity.

== Children ==
1. Gustaf Löwenhielm (1771–1856)
2. Carl Löwenhielm (1772–1861), with Duke Charles
3. Charlotta Lovisa Löwenhielm (1774–1783)
4. Fredrik August Löwenhielm (1776–1776)
