= Governor of Stockholm =

Head of the Office of the Governor of Stockholm

Office of the Governor of Stockholm Överståthållarämbetet
- Corresponding to a county of Sweden
- 1634–1967
- Coat of arms
- Capital: Stockholm
- Government
- Governor of Stockholm
  - 1634–1644: Clas Fleming
  - 1963–1967: Allan Nordenstam
- History
  - Established: 1634
  - Disestablished: 1967
Succeeded by
Governor of Stockholm County / Coat of Arms

The Governor of Stockholm (Swedish: överståthållaren) was the head of the Office of the Governor of Stockholm (Swedish: Överståthållarämbetet, ÖÄ), and as such he was the highest Swedish State official overseeing the affairs in the City of Stockholm between 1634 and 1967. The Governor was the equivalent in Stockholm of a county governor elsewhere in Sweden.

The Governor was appointed by and reported to the King in Council. The Office of the Governor of Stockholm was instituted by the Instrument of Government of 1634, written by Lord High Chancellor Axel Oxenstierna, which uniformly delineated the civil state administration of Sweden into Counties and the Office of the Governor of Stockholm.

While Stockholm County was established in 1714, the city itself was not included until 1968, when the Office of the Governor of Stockholm was abolished and the duties of it was handed over to the Governor of Stockholm County.

== List of governors ==
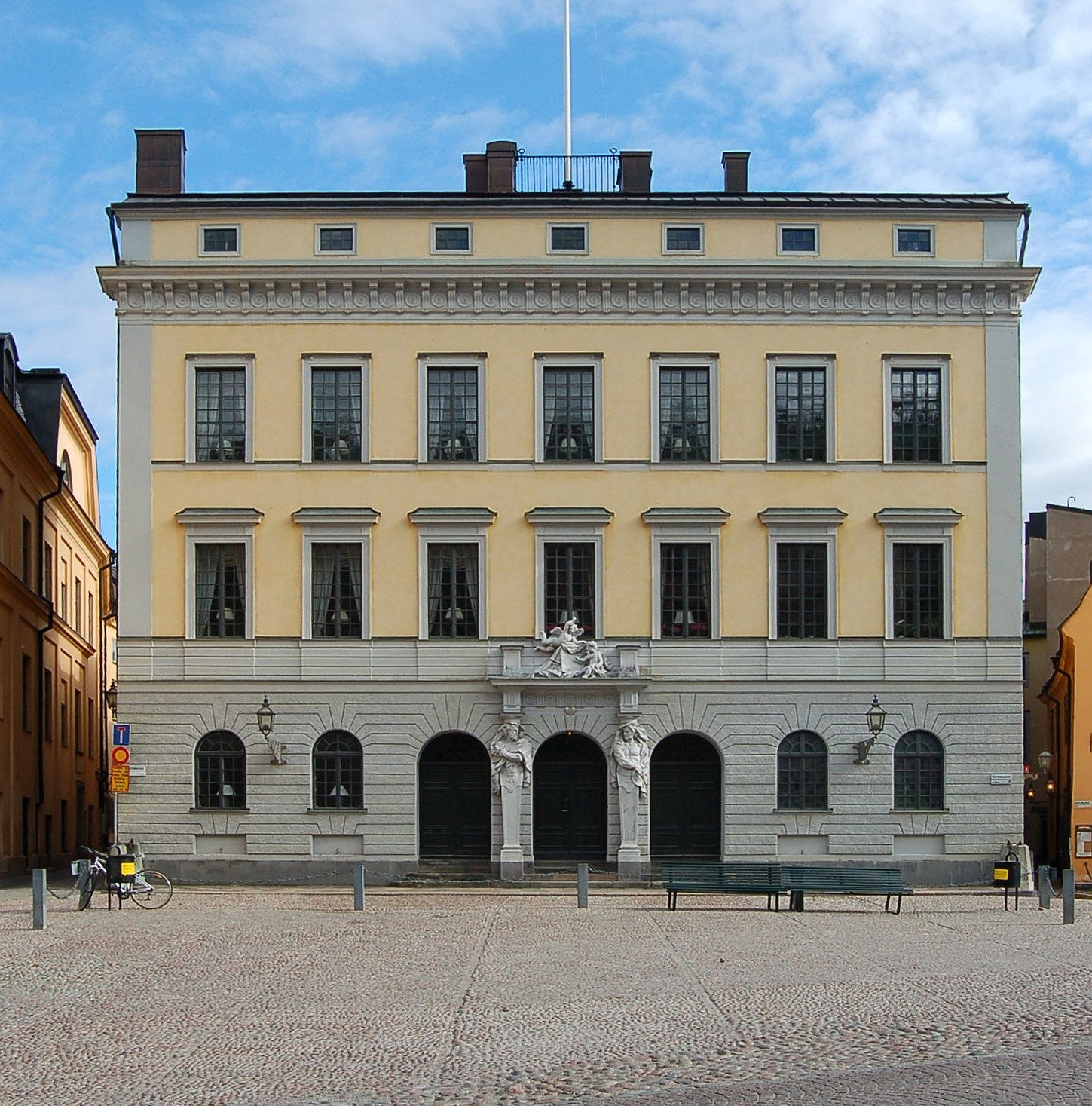
The Tessin Palace at Slottsbacken is currently the residence of the Governor of Stockholm County. Prior to 1968, it was the residence of the Governor.

Portrait	Name	Took office	Left office	Time in office	Ref.
Clas Fleming	Clas Fleming (1592–1644)	16 October 1634	1644	9–10 years	
Knut Göransson Posse	Knut Göransson Posse (1592–1664)	1645	1650	4–5 years	-
Herman Fleming	Herman Fleming (1619–1673)	24 December 1650	26 January 1652	1 year, 33 days	
Johan Berndes	Johan Berndes (1603–1652)	29 January 1652	10 February 1652	12 days	
Schering Rosenhane	Schering Rosenhane (1609–1663)	24 March 1652	1663	10–11 years	
Clas Tott	Clas Tott (1630–1674)	1664	1665	0–1 years	-
Axel Sparre	Axel Sparre (1620–1679)	1665	1673	7–8 years	-
Claes Rålamb	Claes Rålamb (1622–1698)	1673	1678	4–5 years	-
Jöran Gyllenstierna	Jöran Gyllenstierna (1632–1686)	4 December 1678	1682	3–4 years	
Christopher Gyllenstierna	Christopher Gyllenstierna (1647–1705)	1682	1705	22–23 years	-
Knut Göransson Posse	Knut Göransson Posse (1640s–1714)	1705 (Note: Took office 1707.)	1714	8–9 years	-
Jacob Burenskiöld	Jacob Burenskiöld (1655–1738); Acting	20 September 1710	1711 (Note: He was appointed Governor of Stockholm by the Council on 20 September 1710, but resigned from this position according to the Council's letter of 14 March and 18 April 1711, after the announcement that King Charles XII in Bender, appointed him lieutenant general of the cavalry and Governor of Scania on 30 August 1710, and appointed him commander general over the army in Bohuslän (Västgöta Army) on 31 August of the same year.)	0–1 years	
Jakob Spens	Jakob Spens (1647–1705); Acting	1714	1714	0 years	-
Gustaf Adam Taube	Gustaf Adam Taube (1673–1732)	1714	1732	17–18 years	-
Michael Törnflycht	Michael Törnflycht (1683–1738)	1732	1738	5–6 years	-
Rutger Fuchs	Rutger Fuchs (1682–1753)	18 April 1739	1753	13–14 years	
Johan Christoffer von Düring	Johan Christoffer von Düring (1692–1759)	20 June 1753	1759	5–6 years	
Jacob Albrecht von Lantingshausen	Jacob Albrecht von Lantingshausen (1699–1769)	2 April 1759 (Note: Took office in July 1761.)	1769	9–10 years	
Axel Wrede Sparre	Axel Wrede Sparre (1708–1772)	1770	1772	1–2 years	-
Thure Gustaf Rudbeck	Thure Gustaf Rudbeck (1714–1786)	18 February 1772	19 August 1772	183 days	
Carl Fredrik Pechlin	Carl Fredrik Pechlin (1720–1796); Acting	1772	1772	0 years	-
Carl Sparre	Carl Sparre (1723–1791)	22 April 1773	20 June 1791	18 years, 59 days	
Adolf Fredrik Munck	Adolf Fredrik Munck (1749–1831); Acting	11 February 1789	4 May 1789	82 days	
Gustaf Mauritz Armfelt	Gustaf Mauritz Armfelt (1757–1814)	29 March 1792	7 September 1792	159 days	
Carl Vilhelm Modée	Carl Vilhelm Modée (1735–1798)	29 September 1792	1795	2–3 years	
Hans Henrik von Essen	Hans Henrik von Essen (1755–1824)	23 December 1795	8 May 1797	1 year, 136 days	
Samuel af Ugglas	Samuel af Ugglas (1750–1812)	1797	1797	0 years	-
Vacant	Vacant	1797	1800	2–3 years	-
Samuel af Ugglas	Samuel af Ugglas (1750–1812)	1800	1800	0 years	-
Vacant	Vacant	1800	1809	8–9 years	-
Wilhelm Mauritz Klingspor	Wilhelm Mauritz Klingspor (1744–1814)	13 March 1809	29 October 1810	1 year, 230 days	
Anders Fredrik Skjöldebrand	Anders Fredrik Skjöldebrand (1757–1834); Acting	20 June 1810	7 August 1812	2 years, 48 days	
Carl Carlsson Mörner	Carl Carlsson Mörner (1755–1821)	7 August 1812	17 November 1818	6 years, 102 days	
Johan August Sandels	Johan August Sandels (1764–1831); Acting	25 July 1815	1815	0 years	
Rudolf Cederström	Rudolf Cederström (1764–1833); Acting	30 July 1816	15 December 1818	2 years, 138 days	
Daniel Edelcreutz	Daniel Edelcreutz (1761–1828); Acting	15 December 1818	6 October 1828	9 years, 296 days	
Carl Johan af Nordin	Carl Johan af Nordin (1785–1850); Acting	24 October 1828	7 October 1830	1 year, 348 days	
Jacob Wilhelm Sprengtporten	Jacob Wilhelm Sprengtporten (1794–1875)	7 October 1830	30 June 1838	7 years, 266 days	
Axel Johan Adam Möllerhjelm	Axel Johan Adam Möllerhjelm (1787–1846); Acting	1838	29 October 1842	3–4 years	
Claes Hans Rålamb	Claes Hans Rålamb (1784–1867); Acting	1839	1839	0 years	-
Mauritz Axel Lewenhaupt	Mauritz Axel Lewenhaupt (1791–1868); Acting	1842	1844	1–2 years	-
Jacob Wilhelm Sprengtporten	Jacob Wilhelm Sprengtporten (1794–1875)	28 December 1844	26 June 1848	3 years, 181 days	
Jacob Hamilton	Jacob Hamilton (1797–1864)	15 December 1848	7 March 1862	13 years, 82 days	
Gillis Bildt	Gillis Bildt (1820–1894)	13 May 1862	1874	11–12 years	
Gustaf af Ugglas	Gustaf af Ugglas (1820–1895)	1874	1888	13–14 years	-
Klas Gustaf Adolf Tamm	Klas Gustaf Adolf Tamm (1838–1925)	1888	1902	13–14 years	-
Robert Dickson	Robert Dickson (1843–1924)	14 February 1902	31 October 1911	9 years, 259 days	
Carl Hederstierna	Carl Hederstierna (1861–1928); Acting	31 October 1911	1 April 1912	153 days	
Johan Ramstedt	Johan Ramstedt (1852–1935)	29 March 1912 (Note: Took office on 1 April.)	31 December 1920	8 years, 277 days	
Carl Hederstierna	Carl Hederstierna (1861–1928)	3 December 1920	1928	7–8 years	
Mauritz Sahlin	Mauritz Sahlin (1860–1927); Acting	1923	1923	0 years	-
Henning Elmquist	Henning Elmquist (1871–1933)	27 November 1928	1933	4–5 years	
Torsten Nothin	Torsten Nothin (1884–1972)	16 September 1933	30 September 1949	16 years, 14 days	
Johan Hagander	Johan Hagander (1896–1991)	1949	1963	13–14 years	-
Allan Nordenstam	Allan Nordenstam (1904–1982)	1 November 1963	December 1967	3–4 years	

== See also ==
The coat of arms used before 1938.

- Counties of Sweden
- County Governors of Sweden
- Governor-General in the Swedish Realm
- Marshal of the Realm
