= Ulla Adlerfelt =

Swedish artist (1736–1765)

- Born: Ulrika Sofia Sparre af Sundby; Stockholm, Sweden
- Education: Student of Gustaf Lundberg
- Known for: Drawing and oil painting; Swedish noblewoman
- Spouse: Baron Carl Adlerfelt
- Parents: Count Axel Wrede Sparre af Sundby (father); Augusta Thörnflycht (mother)
- Awards: Member of the Royal Swedish Academy of Arts

Ulrika "Ulla" Sofia Adlerfelt, née Sparre af Sundby (21 July 1736 – 1 August 1765), was a Swedish artist (painter) and noble. She was a member of the Royal Swedish Academy of Arts.

She was born in Stockholm, the daughter of Count Axel Wrede Sparre af Sundby and Augusta Thörnflycht and married to Baron Carl Adlerfelt. She was the student of Gustaf Lundberg. She drew, and painted in oil. She died in Malmö.
