= Brita Horn =

Swedish countess and courtier

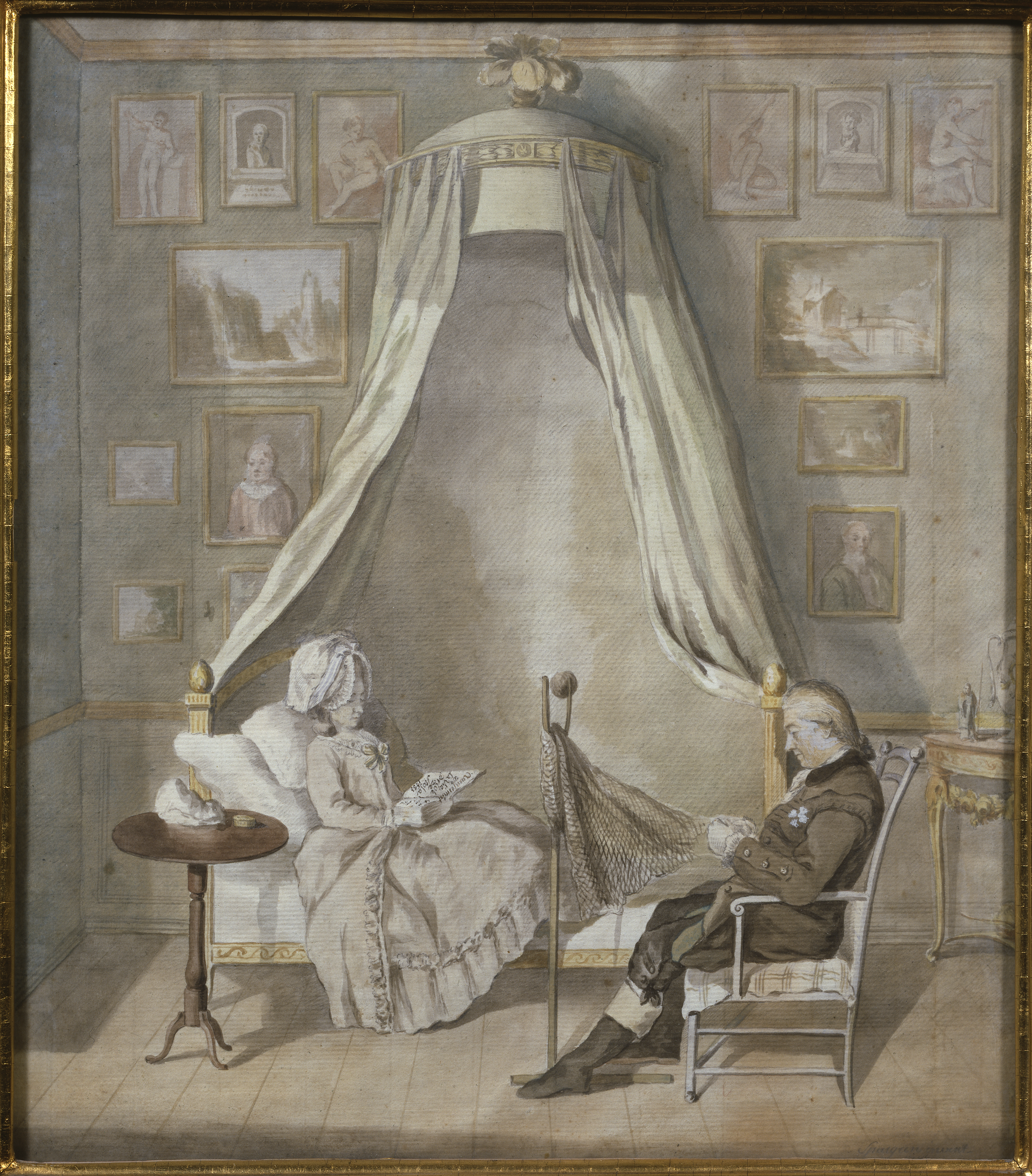
Brita Horn and her spouse, Claes Julius Ekeblad. Painting from 1783 by Lorentz Svensson Sparrgren.

Brita Margaretha Horn (1745 – 13 March 1791), was a Swedish countess and courtier. She is known for being the love interest of Charles XIII of Sweden from 1765 to 1771, during which time Charles' wish to marry her was given political significance and used by the Caps and Hats parties during the Age of Liberty. She is also known for her correspondence with her spouse from 1775 to 1791, which has been partially published.

== Life ==
Brita Horn was one of two children born to riksråd count Adam Horn af Ekebyholm (1717–1778) and countess Anna Katarina Meijerfelt (1722–1779), and the sister of general major Johan Gustaf Horn. Her father, a sympathizer of the Caps, was an infamous rake known for his parties and his many mistresses - the opera singer Carl Stenborg was reputed to be the half brother of Brita Horn, and among his more known lovers where the lady-in-waiting Hedda von Berchner, the actress Marie Baptiste, the dancer Ninon Dubois Le Clerc and the opera singer Elisabeth Olin: his death reportedly caused great fear that his correspondence would expose his former sexual partners to the public. Her mother was insane and lived with the Meijerfelt family, and her father tried without success to divorce her. From 1764 to 1775, Brita Horn served as hovfröken (maid of honour) to Queen Louisa Ulrika.

=== Life at court ===
In 1765, Prince Charles fell in love with Horn. A personal friend and confidante of Charles, count Claes Julius Ekeblad, commented: "It is assumed on good grounds, that the prince is in love with miss Horn. It is a love worthy of a prince", and characterizes Horn as a melancholic neurotic. "... she is possessed by a great deal of languish and a crippling prudishness: you never know if your words please her, because it takes almost nothing to offend her."

In parallel, Prince Frederick courted another lady in waiting, Ulla von Fersen, with the same intent. This is mentioned in the memoirs of the courtier Adolf Ludvig Hamilton from 1767, when he mentioned the love of the princes for "the maids of honor Brita Horn and Ulrika Fersen. Prince Charles' love for the first, prince Frederick's for the second, were both adjusted to the character of the two ladies. Miss Horn was blond, virtuous, sometimes cold, sometimes tender. She had almost made passion of her influence. Miss Fersen, funny, jolly, happy, capricious, considered the whole affair as a pastime which flattered her confidence and left it at that". Hamilton described a scene at Kina slott that summer:

"In one corner, the queen discussed politics, in another, the king talked about the hay- and oat prices with his equerry, the crown prince about fashion and France with Countess Ribbing (born Löwen). Prince Frederick bickered with his beauty [Ulla Fersen], Prince Charles stood faithfully by his [Brita Horn], but in silence. The crown princess stood changing feet in boredom - the rest of the court yawned or slept."

Both couples exchanged rings as a token of an unofficial engagement with the intent to marry. In both cases, the royal family was opposed to the love matches. However, while the family of Brita Horn supported a marriage between prince Charles and Brita Horn, the family of Ulla von Fersen opposed her marriage to prince Frederick. The desired love matches of the princes came to be used by the political parties during the Riksdag of 1769 following the December Crisis (1768). The Caps (party), supported by the family of Brita Horn, promised prince Charles the support of his love marriage with Brita Horn from the Riksdag against the will of the royal house in exchange for his support. As a counter attack, the Hats made the same offer to prince Frederick. This caused a crisis. However, the family of Ulla von Fersen refused to cooperate with the Hats as they did not wish the marriage to take place, and in 1770, they had Ulla von Fersen married. The same year, prince Charles was refused permission by his mother and elder brother to marry Brita Horn, and sent abroad on a trip to forget her. Upon his return in 1771, Brita Horn was selected to accompany the queen dowager Louisa Ulrika on her trip to Berlin in 1771–72, and during her absence Charles became the lover of Augusta von Fersen. Neither of the affairs were, as far as it is known, sexually consummated, and neither Horn nor von Fersen had any position of being a royal mistress.

=== Later life ===
In 1775, she resigned from court service upon her marriage to the courtier Count Claes Julius Ekeblad (1742–1808), a friend of her former love prince Charles. The marriage was childless but described as happy. The marriage between Brita Horn and Claes Julius Ekeblad was a love match, which is evident from their correspondence and which was, at the time, unusual and considered curious and controversial, as it was not the contemporary custom among the aristocracy to marry for love. After their wedding, Brita Horn lived with her mother-in-law Eva Ekeblad on the Stola estate in the country side, while Claes Julius Ekeblad continued in his court service for economic reasons. Consequently, they were separated for large parts of the year, during which they corresponded with each other.

The couple was themselves aware that their love marriage was considered odd, and remarked about it in their correspondence, where Ekeblad once wrote: "My humble vision of happiness is to love and be loved by you. May the masses view it as they wish, I have other standards than the masses": he stated that he considered the liberal sexual morals at court decadent, and seven years after their marriage passionately asked her for strands of her hair to make a ring which could remind him of her during their separation, upon which she answered:

"My sweet Claes, what do you want with my hair? All people du bon ton will laugh and make fun of you for wearing a ring made of hair from your own wife. Had it been mixed with the hair from some of the fair ladies, it would not be so ridicule, but keep quite about it, otherwise they would never want you in Stockholm any more after having done such a thing. Though I have no more hair than I need, it is so dear to me that you wish to wear it that I cannot deny you even if it would make me bald."

Their correspondence is preserved and has been partially published. Brita Horn was herself offered a position at court by Gustav III, but refused to return to court. The strain and pain of the separation caused by the court service of her spouse is however increasingly evident in the letters, a matter of which she often complained and lamented about in between news of politics, gossip, fashion and affairs of the estate, and as the years progressed, she repeatedly but unsuccessfully asked him to refuse further court appointments for her sake.

Brita Horn drowned herself during a depression or, as it was called at the time, in "a moment of temporary insanity" after a long period of melancholy in 1791.
