= Sparre =

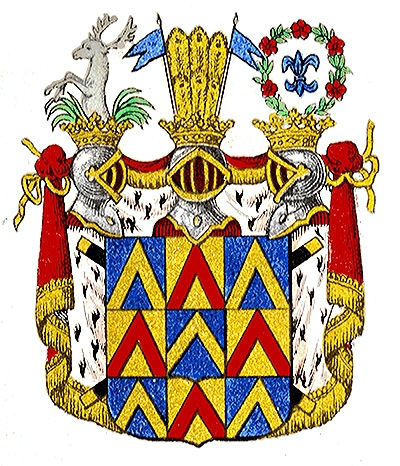
Coat of arms of Counts Sparre af Sundby

Sparre (variously spelled Sperra, Sper, Spar) is a Scandinavian surname – originally borne by a noble family – and can refer to:

- Aage Jepsen Sparre, Danish priest
- Arvid Gustavsson Sparre (1245–1317), Lord of Ekholmen, Sweden
- Axel Sparre (1652–1728), Swedish field marshal
- Beata Sparre, Swedish courtier
- Christian Sparre, Norwegian politician
- Desirée Sparre-Enger, Norwegian pop singer
- Erik Sparre (1550–1600), Swedish nobleman executed at the Linköping Bloodbath
- Gustaf Adolf Sparre, Swedish art collector
- Gustaf Adolf Vive Sparre, Prime Minister for Justice of Sweden from 1848 to 1856
- Gustaf Sparre (speaker), Speaker of the Första kammaren 1896–1908
- Louis Sparre (1863–1964), Swedish painter and Olympian
- Malise Sparre (d. 1389), claimant to the Earldom of Orkney
- Pehr Ambjörn Sparre (1828–1921), Swedish inventor

Various governors of Swedish counties:

- Axel Sparre, Over-Governor of Stockholm from 1665 to 1673
- Axel Wrede Sparre, Over-Governor of Stockholm from 1770 to 1772
- Carl Georg Sparre, Governor of Norrbotten County from 1825 to 1836
- Carl Gustaf Sparre, Governor of Södermanland County from 1737 to 1739
- Carl Larsson Sparre, Governor of Västernorrland County from 1664 to 1677
- Carl Sparre, Governor of Gävleborg County from 1763 and 1772 and Over-Governor of Stockholm from 1773 to 1791
- Erik Carlsson Sparre, Governor of Södermanland County from 1657 to 1678
- Erik Samuel Sparre, Governor of Gävleborg County from 1813 to 1843
- Fredrik Henrik Sparre, Governor of Gävleborg County from 1762 to 1763
- Göran Bengtsson Sparre af Rossvik, Governor of Södermanland County from 1653 to 1657
- Knut Sparre, Governor of Jämtland County from 1895 to 1906
- Svante Larsson Sparre, Governor of Stockholm County and Uppsala County from 1649 to 1651

== See also ==
- Sparr (disambiguation)
