= Jakob Wilhelm Sprengtporten =

Swedish statesman (1794–1875)

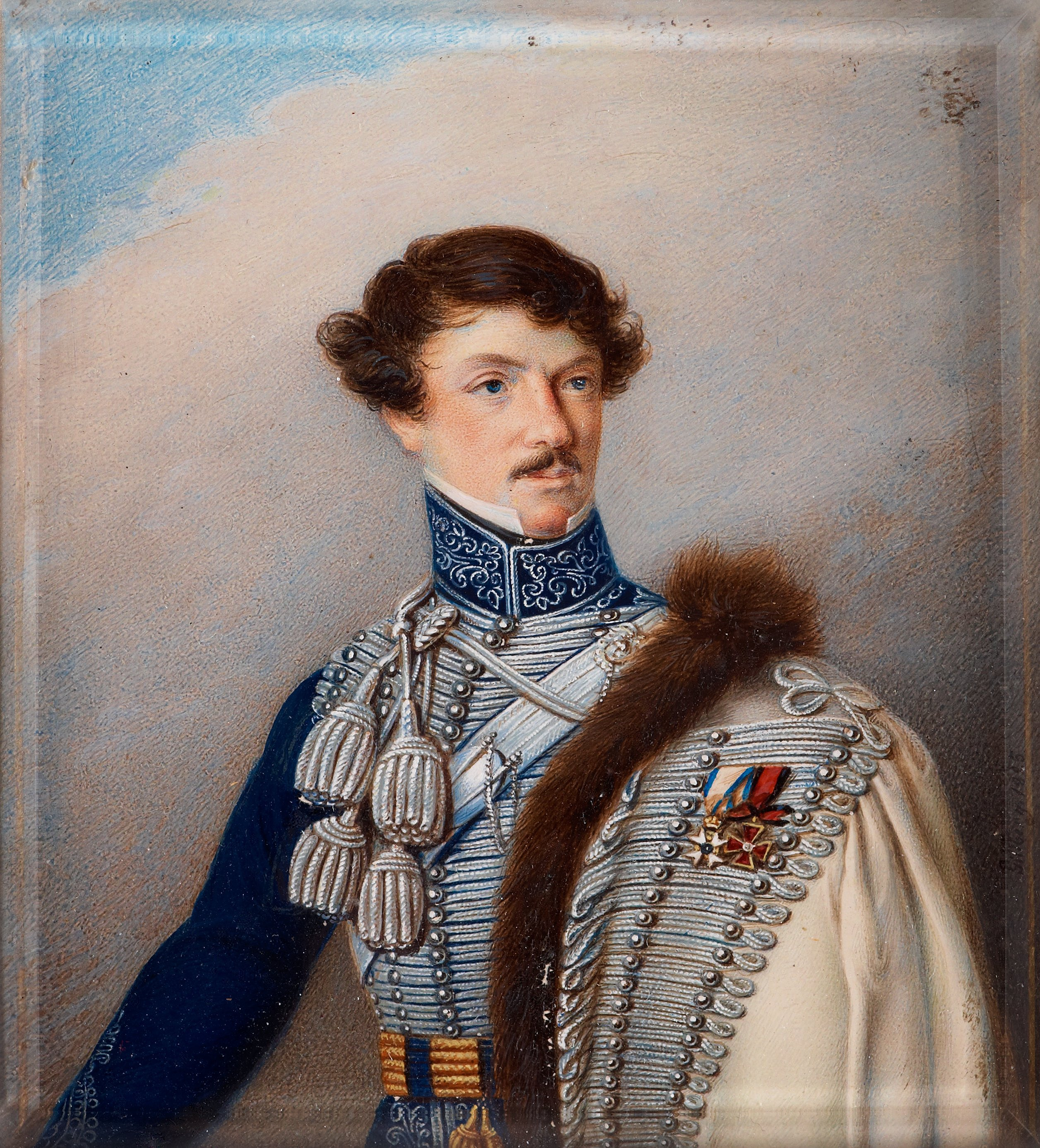
- Jakob Wilhelm Sprengtporten painted by Jacob Axel Gillberg in 1825.

Governor of Stockholm
- In office 1830–1838
- Preceded by: Carl Johan af Nordin
- Succeeded by: Axel Johan Adam Möllerhjelm

Personal details
- Born: 9 October 1794 Sparreholm Castle, Södermanland, Sweden
- Died: 25 September 1875 (aged 80)

Jakob Wilhelm Sprengtporten (9 October 1794 – 29 September 1875) was a Swedish statesman and Lord of the Realm. He served as governor of Stockholm between 1830 and 1838 and as member of the Riksdag of the Estates between 1823 and 1866.

Jakob Wilhelm Sprengtporten was born into the Sprengtporten family at Sparreholm Castle in Södermanland, Sweden, the son of Baron Johan Vilhelm Sprengtporten and the Countess Sophia Lovisa Mörner af Morlanda. He had a sister, Countess Ulla De Geer. He attended Uppsala University.

In 1825, Sprengtporten married Countess Ulrika Wilhelmina Brahe.
