= Johan August Meijerfeldt the Younger =

Swedish field marshal

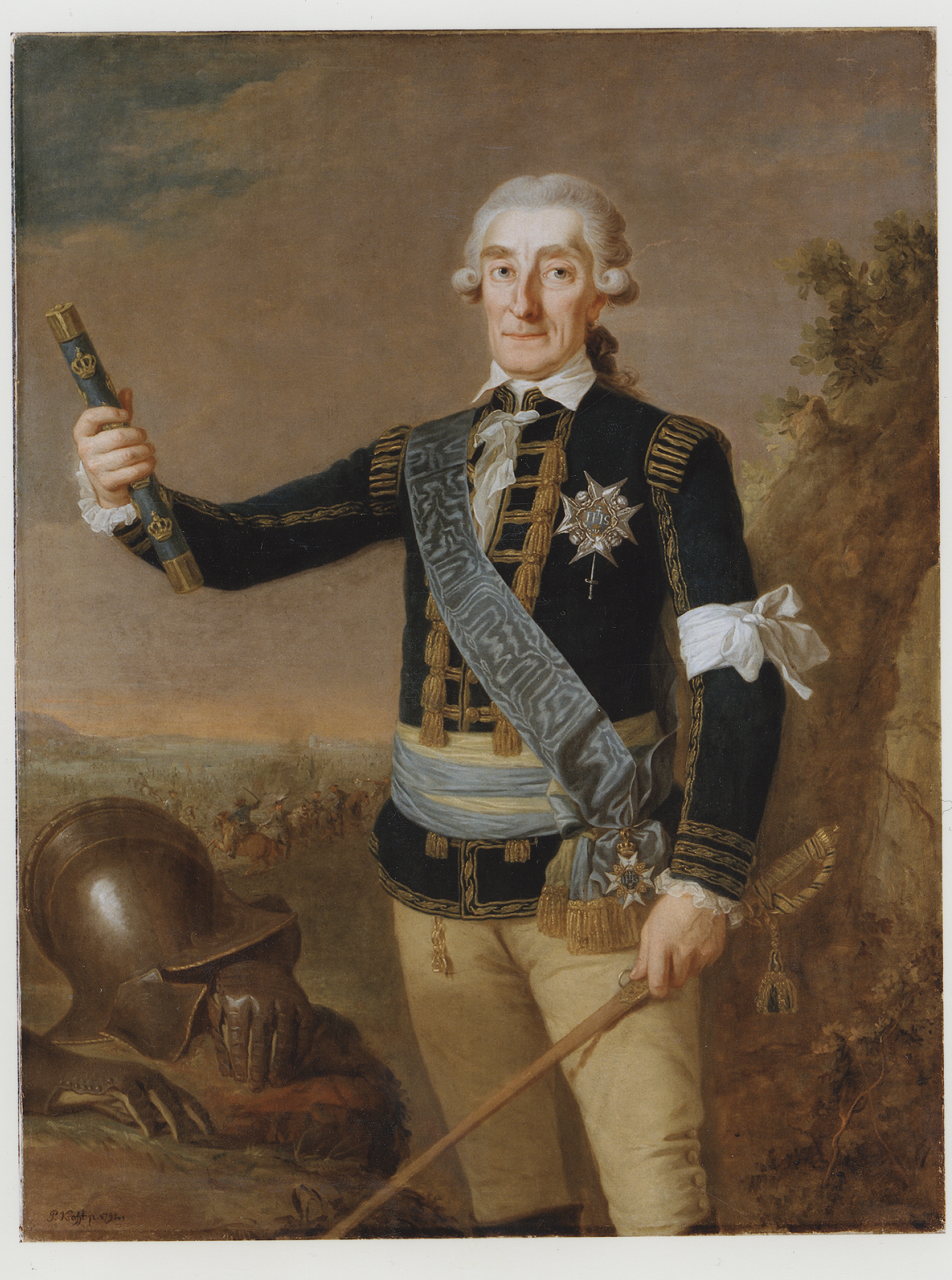
Portrait of Johan August Meijerfeldt the Younger by Per Krafft the Elder

Count Johan August Meijerfeldt (4 May 1725 – 21 April 1800) was a Swedish field marshal. To distinguish him from his father, Johan August Meijerfeldt the Elder, he is generally referred to as Johan August Meijerfeldt the Younger. He pursued a military career both outside Sweden, and as an officer in Swedish service in the Pomeranian War and the Russo-Swedish War. Towards the end of the latter war, he was given command of all Swedish land forces in Finland, and promoted to field marshal at the end of the war. He was married to Louise Meijerfeldt.

== Biography ==
The Meijerfeldt family came from Livonia. Johan August Meijerfeldt the Younger was born in Stralsund in Swedish Pomerania on 4 May 1725. He began a military career early in life. In 1737 he was already serving in a regiment in his hometown. In 1744 he was promoted to the rank of captain, and the following year received royal permission to leave the country to fight in the War of the Austrian Succession on the side of Austria, first against Prussia and later against France. He participated in the Battle of Soor and the Battle of Kesselsdorf, and in 1746 he was taken prisoner by French troops. After his release he returned to Sweden.

Back in Sweden he became a confidant of Queen Louisa Ulrika and aided her in trying to raise funds abroad for her failed coup d'etat in 1756. After the failed coup, Meijerfeldt was briefly arrested and questioned but did not suffer any serious repercussions. However, he again left Sweden to fight in the Seven Years' War, this time on the side of Brunswick. He participated in the Battle of Hastenbeck in 1757. Following Sweden's entry into the war, he returned to Sweden and joined the Swedish army. He commanded forces fighting around Peenemünde, Güstrow and Wolin during the subsequent Pomeranian War. In 1759 he was promoted to the rank of lieutenant colonel.

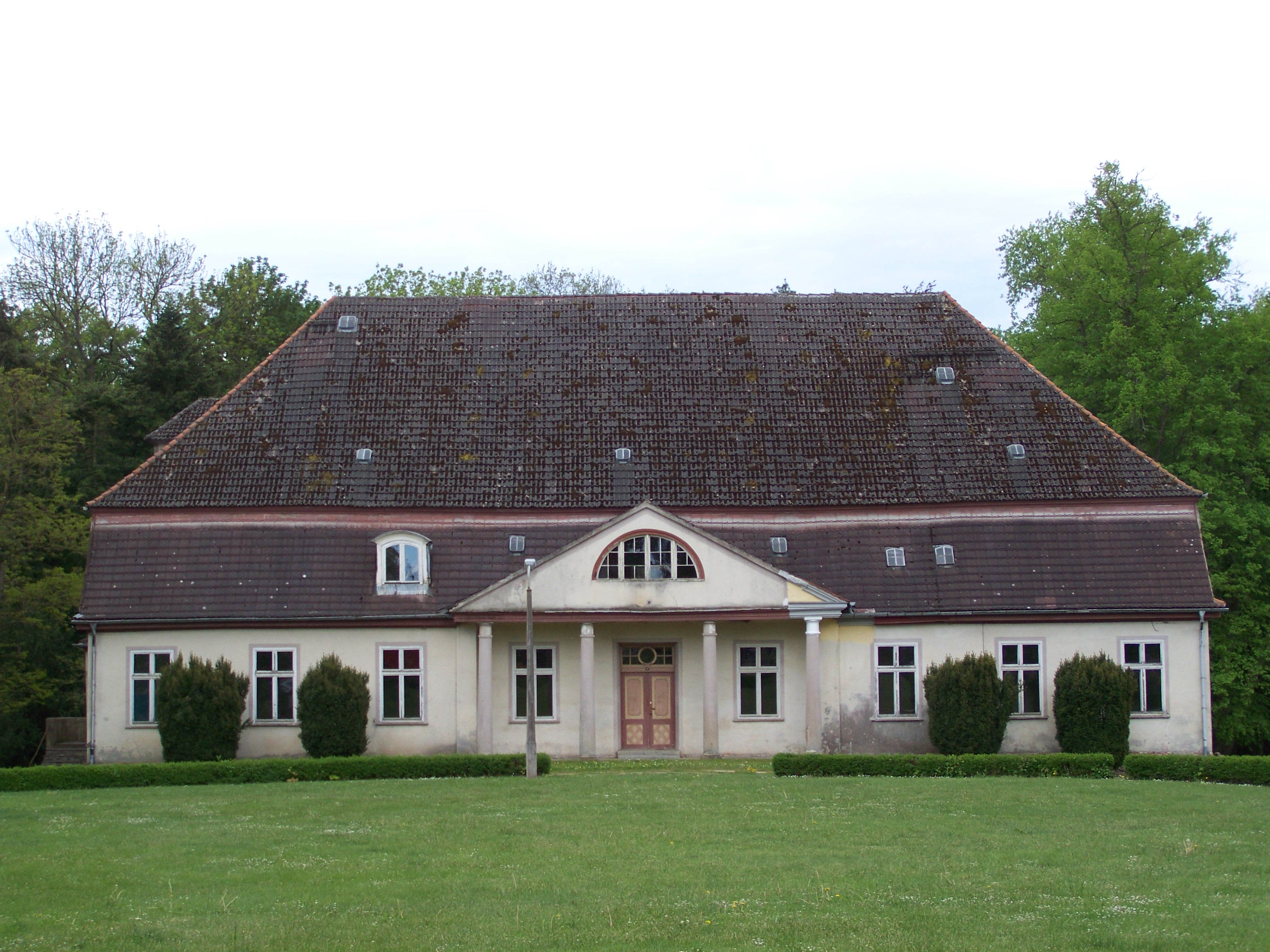
The manor house in Nehringen, where Meijerfeldt lived after retirement.

He was politically engaged in Sweden during the 1760s, -70s and -80s. With the outbreak of the Russo-Swedish War in 1788, he returned to active military service and initially commanded a brigade attempting to take Hamina, an effort which derailed due to a lack of supplies and ammunition. Following the Anjala conspiracy, Meijerfeldt was given command of the forces around Anjala. In December 1788 he was given the overall command of all land forces in Finland in the absence of the king. In this capacity he reconquered Karkkila in July 1789, and managed to thwart further Russian gains in Finland. When the war ended with the Treaty of Värälä, he was promoted to field marshal. Soon after the war he retired, in opposition to the increasingly authoritarian politics of King Gustav III. He spent most of his remaining life at his family estate in Nehringen in Pomerania.

He married Louise Meijerfeldt in 1763. He died in Stockholm on 21 April 1800.

== Awards and decorations ==
- Order of the Seraphim (1797)

== Sources cited ==
- Dahl, Torsten, ed. (1948). Svenska män och kvinnor. Biografisk uppslagsbok [Swedish men and women. Biographical dictionary] (in Swedish). Vol. 5. Stockholm: Albert Bonnier. OCLC 4629338.
- Hofberg, Herman; Heurlin, Frithiof; Millqvist, Viktor; Rubenson, Olof, eds. (1906). Svenskt biografiskt handlexikon [Swedish biographical handbook] (in Swedish). Vol. 2. Stockholm: Bonniers. OCLC 474064019.
- Rosander, Lars (2003). Sveriges fältmarskalkar [The field marshals of Sweden] (in Swedish). Lund: Historiska media. ISBN 91-89442-05-9.
