= Ulla De Geer =

Swedish countess and salon holder (1793–1869)

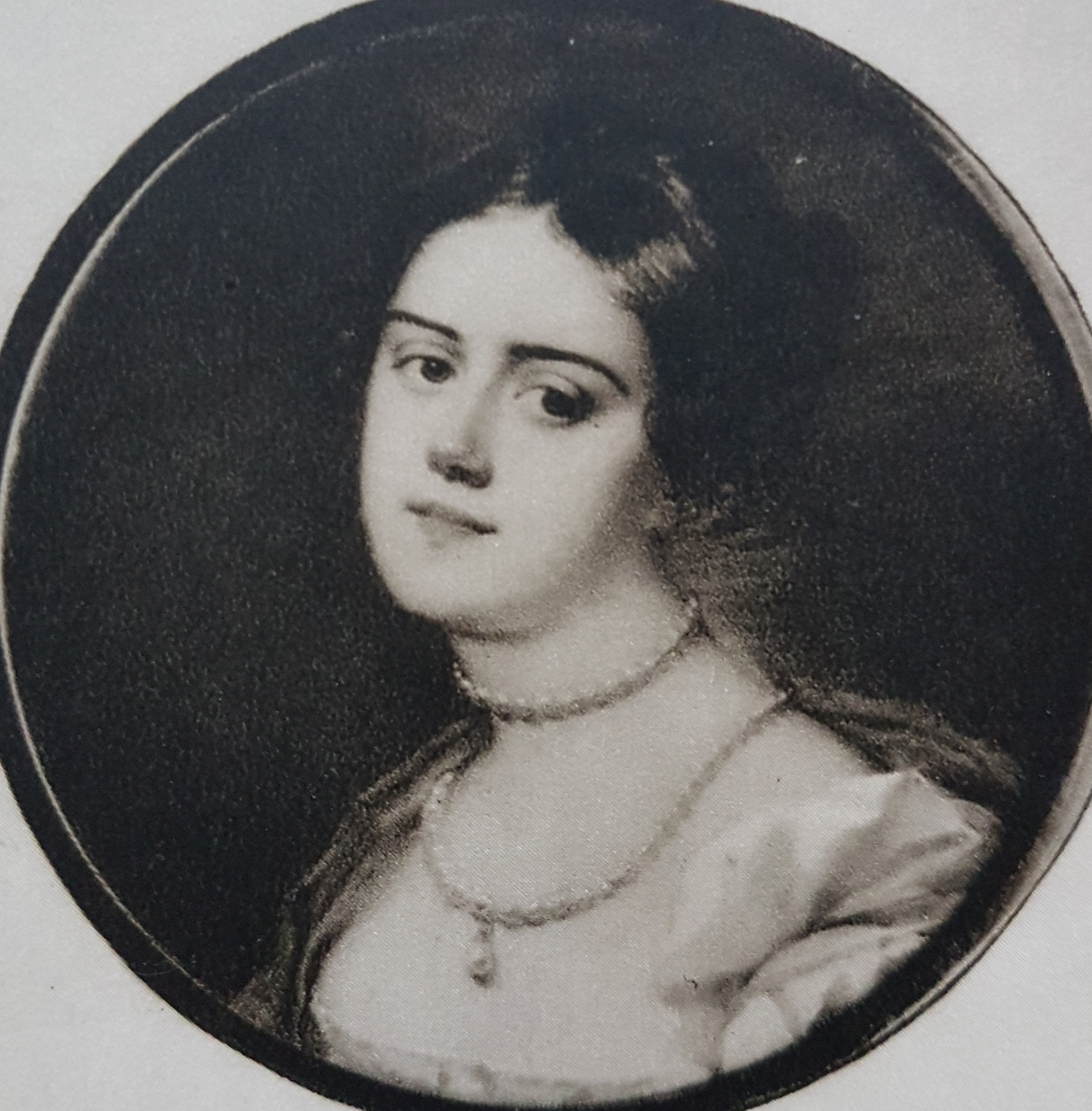
Ulla De Geer

Ulrika "Ulla" Sofia De Geer (née Sprengtporten; 20 August 1793 – 22 September 1869 in Stockholm) was a politically influential Swedish countess and salon holder. She was married to the politician count Carl De Geer, over whom she is believed to have exerted influence, and was a central figure in the Stockholm high society in the mid-19th century.

== Life ==
Ulla De Geer was born to Baron Johan Vilhelm Sprengtporten and Sophia Lovisa Mörner af Morlanda, the sister of Baron Jakob Wilhelm Sprengtporten. She married Count Carl De Geer, a politician, in 1810. The marriage was arranged and she had been forced to abandon Karl Fredrik Reinhold von Essen, with whom she was truly in love. This caused a depression which attracted attention: after the death of von Essen in 1820, she publicly dressed in mourning as if she were a widow.

Ulla De Geer was a leading member of the Stockholm high society and hosted a salon that was a center of political discussions. She used the ritualized system of visits and regular receptions to create valuable contacts that could be used to gather information and wield influence. She adhered strictly to ceremony, and it is described how her guests were to pass through three salons before reaching her, where she greeted them ceremoniously. She rivaled Claire Lucie Mouradgea d'Ohsson (1776–1861), in whose salon foreign diplomats were to be introduced to the Swedish aristocracy, but Ulla De Geer has been described as the leading Swedish society hostess of her generation: through her connections, she belonged to those who set the tone for what was acceptable, and was described as a "powerful person in high society". Nils von Dardel once illustrated this by a drawing in which men from the court submissively bowed before her. Carl Gustaf von Brinkman was known to frequent her salon. De Geer was attributed political influence and believed to be responsible for Carl De Geer's siding with the opposition in the parliament of 1840.

When she was widowed in 1861, she retired from social life and stopped entertaining: her position as leading society hostess being taken over by the stepdaughter of her rival, Aurore Palin (1837-1909), and she restricted herself to socializing with her family and her English lady's companion Miss Carus. The second half of the 19th century marked a break with old customs within the Swedish aristocracy and the old system with ritualized visits and receptions dissipated. F. U. Wrangel described her as: "the only one, who upheld the tradition with regular evening receptions within the Stockholm aristocracy. In her home, the creme de la creme of the highest society gathered, where the same cultivated conversation and manner thrived as in its role model in Faubourg Saint-Germain in Paris... she was in my opinion Sweden's last grande dame in the true meaning of the word."
