= Kavlås Castle =

- Tidaholm Municipality, Sweden
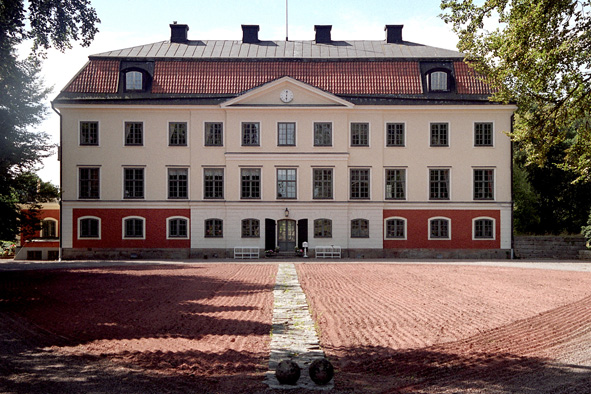

Location
- Coordinates: 58°13′34″N 13°52′34″E

Kavlås Castle (Kavlås slott) is a manor house in Hömbs parish in Tidaholm Municipality in Västra Götaland County, Sweden.

== History ==
Kavlås was first mentioned at the end of the 14th century. Through purchases, the estate came to the baronial family von Essen in 1723. The main building is on three floors and was built between 1750 and 1775 under Fredric Ulric von Essen (1721-1781). The house has elements of both Rococo and Gustavian style.

== See also ==
- List of castles in Sweden
