= Adolph Ribbing =

Swedish politician (1765–1843)

- Count
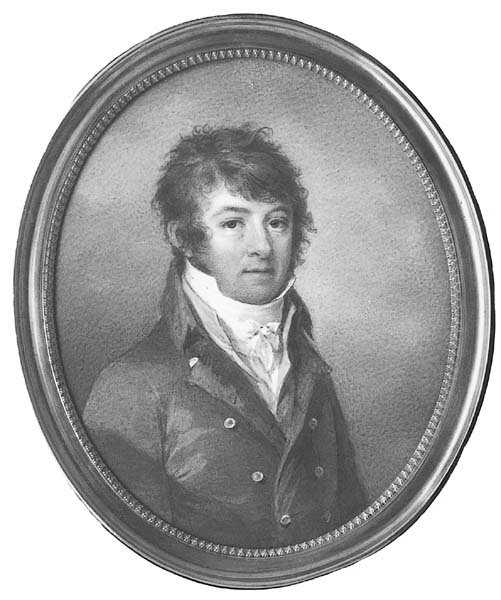
- Adolph Ludvig Ribbing
- Born: 10 January 1765; Stockholm, Sweden
- Died: 1 April 1843 (aged 78); Paris, France
- Spouse: Adèle Billard d'Aubigny
- Issue: Adolphe de Leuven
- Father: Fredrik Ribbing
- Mother: Eva Helena Löwen
- Occupation: Politician

Adolph Ludvig Ribbing, later called Adolph de Leuven (10 January 1765 – 1 April 1843), was a Swedish count and politician. He participated in the regicide of Gustav III of Sweden in 1792.

== Life ==
=== Early life ===
Adolph Ribbing was the son of Count Fredrik Ribbing and Eva Helena Löwen. He spent his childhood at the Swedish royal court, as his mother was a popular socialite and the personal friend of both Louisa Ulrika of Prussia and Gustav III of Sweden. He received a military education in Berlin and Paris and became a member of the Life Guards.

=== Assassination of Gustav III ===
In the 1780s, Ribbing came in conflict with the monarch, Gustav III. His animosity was nurtured when Charlotta Eleonora De Geer, with whom he was in love, was matched by the king with count Hans Henrik von Essen. The engagement was widely disapproved of within the court because of sympathy with the popular Augusta von Fersen, to whom von Essen had been a long term lover, and Ribbing challenged von Essen to a duel. Ribbing injured von Essen in the duel, which took place in 1788. The duel caused a scandal and was regarded as a crime against the king. Ribbing was assigned to the garrison at Vaxholm Castle, which he regarded as an insult, and he therefore resigned from the army.

Ribbing took part in the 1789 session of the Riksdag (the Swedish parliament), acting as one of the leaders of the opposition to the king's increasingly autocratic policies, such as the Union and Security Act.

In early 1792 he became involved in the plot to assassinate King Gustav, serving as the liaison between the conspiracy's leader Carl Fredrik Pechlin and the two men who had volunteered to carry out the murder, Claes Fredrik Horn and Jacob Johan Anckarström in 1792. When Anckarström, Horn and Ribbing met on the afternoon of 16 March to finalise their plans, they did so at the house of Ribbing's lover, Louisa Hierta. That evening, the three conspirators attended a masquerade ball at the Royal Opera House, during which either Anckarström or Ribbing (who boasted of it later when in exile) shot and wounded the king.

Ribbing was arrested within a few days of the assassination and confessed to partaking in the conspiracy. Ribbing was sentenced to death in May 1792 and deprived of his rank as a noble, but the regent Duke Charles (later King Charles XIII) commuted the sentence to exile.

=== Exile ===
In August 1792 Ribbing was deported to Denmark, and thence made his way to France. Despite his enthusiasm for the Revolution he was unsettled by the burgeoning Reign of Terror and therefore left France, relocating first to Switzerland, where he had an affair with the famous writer Madame de Staël, and then back to Denmark. By 1796 the situation in France had calmed down sufficiently for Ribbing to return to Paris. He adopted his mother's maiden name, de Leuven, and lived a quiet, apolitical life for the next nineteen years, during which time he married Adèle Billard, daughter of the doctor Jean Pierre Billard.

As a known regicide, Adolph de Leuven (as he now called himself) did not feel safe during the White Terror of 1815, and he therefore left France again, this time for Brussels, where he found work as a journalist for the radical newspaper Le Vrai Libéral. His writings for this organ earned him the enmity of King Frederick William III of Prussia, who in 1820 persuaded the United Kingdom of the Netherlands to deport him. He returned to France, where persecution of radicals had eased since 1815, and continued to work in left-wing journalism, this time for Le Courrier Français. In 1830, aged 65, he took an active role in the July Revolution which overthrew the reactionary Bourbon restoration regime and installed the liberal July Monarchy. He died in 1843.

His son and namesake, Adolphe de Leuven, was a noted playwright and theatre director.

== Sources ==
- Bohman, Nils; Dahl, Torsten, eds. (1942–1955). Svenska män och kvinnor: biografisk uppslagsbok (in Swedish). Stockholm: Bonnier.
- Grimberg, Carl (1922). Svenska folkets underbara öden. [7], Gustav III:s och Gustav IV Adolfs tid (in Swedish). Stockholm: Norstedt.
- Cecilia af Klercker (1903). Hedvig Elisabeth Charlottas dagbok II 1783-1788. P.A. Norstedt & Söners förlag. Sid. 212
