= Åkerö (disambiguation) =

Åkerö is a Swedish apple variety.

Åkerö may also refer to:

- Åkerö Manor, an estate in Södermanland, Sweden
- Fredrika Åkerö, a Finnish politician
