= Ulla Tessin =

Swedish countess (1711–1768)

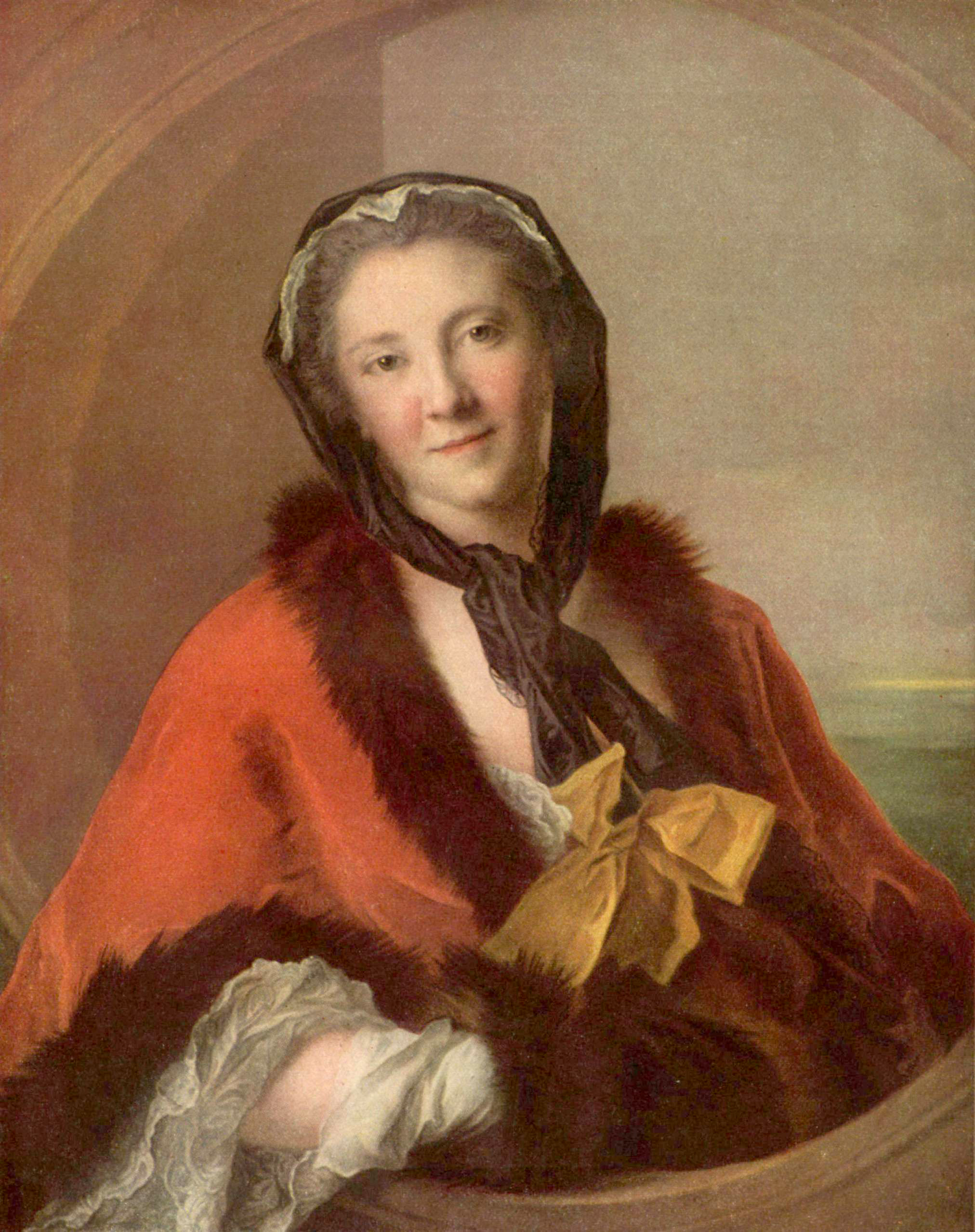
La comtesse Tessin (1741) Paris, Musée du Louvre, portrait by Jean-Marc Nattier

Ulrika "Ulla" Lovisa Tessin née Sparre (23 May 1711 – 14 December 1768) was a Swedish courtier, letter writer and dilettante artist.

== Life ==
Ulla Tessin was born to riksråd marshal count Erik Sparre of Sundby and Christina (Stina) Beata Lillie. She was given private tuition in both modern and Classical language and could speak French, German and Italian. Her half-brother was Axel Wrede Sparre.

=== Marriage ===
She was engaged in 1725 and married 27 August 1727 to Count Carl Gustaf Tessin. Because her fortune exceeded that of her spouse, he was by law required to grant her both the Tessin Palace as well as the Boo Manor as her dower. The marriage was childless.

The Tessin's were leading members of the interest in amateur theater within the Swedish aristocracy which attracted the interest for theater that lay the foundation of the first professional Swedish language theater in Bollhuset in 1737. On 1 February 1732, for example, they directed and acted in the French play Dom Japhlet d'Arménie by Paul Scarron, which was performed by noble amateur actors for the royal court at Bollhuset.

Ulla Tessin accompanied her husband on his diplomatic posts to Vienna (1735–36), Copenhagen and Paris (1739–41) and Berlin (1744). She is described as a socially and artistically gifted socialite, who was admired for her character and easily made contacts which were of use to him during his diplomatic missions. In France, for example, to where she was accompanied also by her niece Charlotta Sparre, she made a success at the royal court of Versailles and became a personal friend of queen Marie Leszczyńska and princess Marie Sophie de Rohan, who offered to share her fortune with her if she settled permanently in France.

=== Life at court ===
During the mission of her spouse in Berlin in Prussia, the couple was given the assignment to escort Louisa Ulrika of Prussia, the intended bride of crown prince Frederick Adolph of Sweden, from Prussia to her wedding in Sweden. Both she and her spouse became the favorites of Louisa Ulrika during her tenure as crown princess of Sweden, and belonged to her intimate circle of friends. Ulla Tessin was made a Dame of the L’Ordre de l’Harmonie, and Carl Gustaf Tessin became the political partner of Louisa Ulrika.

When Frederick Adolph and Louisa Ulrika became king and queen of Sweden in 1751, Carl Gustaf Tessin was made royal governor of the royal children and Ulla Tessin succeeded Hedvig Elisabet Strömfelt as överhovmästarinna (mistress of the robes). In 1754, Carl Gustaf Tessin lost his favor with the queen and was dismissed from court. Ulla Tessin managed to distance herself from the fall of her spouse, waited for a while and then managed to resign from her office in favor of Ulrica Catharina Stromberg without losing the queen's favor. Soon, however, she also lost the favor of the queen, who deprived her of her pension. The Tessin couple lived their remaining life in retirement at their estate Åkerö Manor.

=== Later life ===
Ulla Tessin was described as intellectual and educated. Her spouse left the management of the household economy on her; he also supported her interest to study history and botany, and she collected a substantial library. In her correspondence, she expressed her frustration and anger over the passive role imposed on women when the laws and customs of society deprived her of most positions in society: "Does not men have their honor, their sword, their judge's caps, their politics, their horticulture etc? I have to admit I shrug to see something like the French Academy, assembled in full. A true usurpation, it should be composed entirely by women; but the beastly men usurp everything, is surprise me that they leave us the spindle and the sewing needle. Well, we must adjust, until it is our turn to write laws. Then we will have the opportunity to let them see the meaning of the right of the fittest."

== Legacy ==
The correspondence between Ulla Tessin and Louisa Ulrika is kept at Riksarkivet, and letters to her husband and family are kept in the archives of Ericsberg Castle, Bergshammar and Börstorp.

Court offices
Preceded by Hedvig Elisabet Strömfelt	Överhovmästarinna to the Queen of Sweden; 1751–1754	Succeeded by Ulrica Catharina Stromberg
