= Stockholm Alhambra Vase =

- Alhambravasen (Swedish)
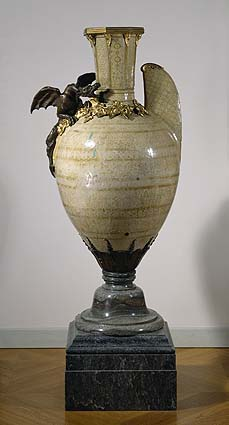
- Year: Late 14th Century
- Medium: Faience, metallic lustre
- Dimensions: 155 cm × 80 cm (61 in × 31 in)
- Location: Nationalmuseum, Stockholm, Sweden
- Accession: NMK 47

The Stockholm Alhambra Vase is a fourteenth-century Islamic vessel supposedly from the Alhambra in Granada, Spain. Since 1648, the vase moved from Spain to Sweden where it now resides in the collections of the Nationalmuseum in Stockholm, Sweden. The Alhambra Vase arrived to Sweden from Queen Christina's sacking of Prague in 1648, mainly of the treasures accumulated by the Holy Roman Emperor Rudolf II. These are the last immediate movements of the vessel from its earlier locations. The vase ended up in the library at Drottningholm Palace in the 1740s where it stayed until 1865 when it moved into the Nationalmuseum collection. During the period of time in the palace library, the additions of the bronze dragon and wreath were made and placed onto the vase. These metal additions were based on a design by the Swedish artist and architect Carl Hårleman.

== History ==
The Alhambra Vase belongs to a larger set of wing-handled vases which are collectively known as the "Alhambra Vases" and were most likely made in Málaga, a famous center for glazed and lustered pottery.

Before the Alhambra Vase arrived in the Royal Swedish collections in the mid-seventeenth century, it moved from the Alhambra Palace and first came to Famagusta, Cyprus at an unknown date. Acquiring the properities of a holy relic, being considered one of the jars from the Marriage at Cana, the vase was kept on display at the monastery of Santa Maria Hydria. Numerous early-modern accounts from Christian pilgrimage journeys to Cyprus provide information about the state of the vase in the sixteenth century. In 1512, the Spanish friar Diego de Mérida, described:

"In a small church of a monastery of nuns there is one of the hydrias or stone water jars from which our Redeemer performed the miracle of the conversion of water into wine at the Marriage of Cana in Galilee, this jar is in its entirety and it is a very beautiful thing to see."

By 1512, the Alhambra Vase appeared to be completely intact from the movement out of Nasrid Granada. But by 1566, the Nuremberg pilgrim Christoph Fürer wrote of "a large earthen pot, one handle of which is completely torn off, while the other is partly broken." Between the early to mid-sixteenth century, the Alhambra Vase seems to have suffered its first aesthetic change in the breaking of one of the winged handles.

== Function ==
Produced for the Nasrid court at the Alhambra, it was once thought that these vases contained valuable liquids like oils or wine, as they are too slender and ornate to be considered tinajas or jars often used for holding water. The Stockholm Alhambra Vase, like the other extant Alhambra vases were likely used for decorative purposes given their scale and winged handles, designed for lateral movements instead of for carrying water. Collectively, the Alhambra vases are not meant to hold anything in particular. Instead, they "reaffirm the high status of the Nasrids and their faith in Allah."
