= Sätuna Manor =

Manor house in Björklinge, Sweden

Coordinates: 60°03′38″N 17°34′05″E

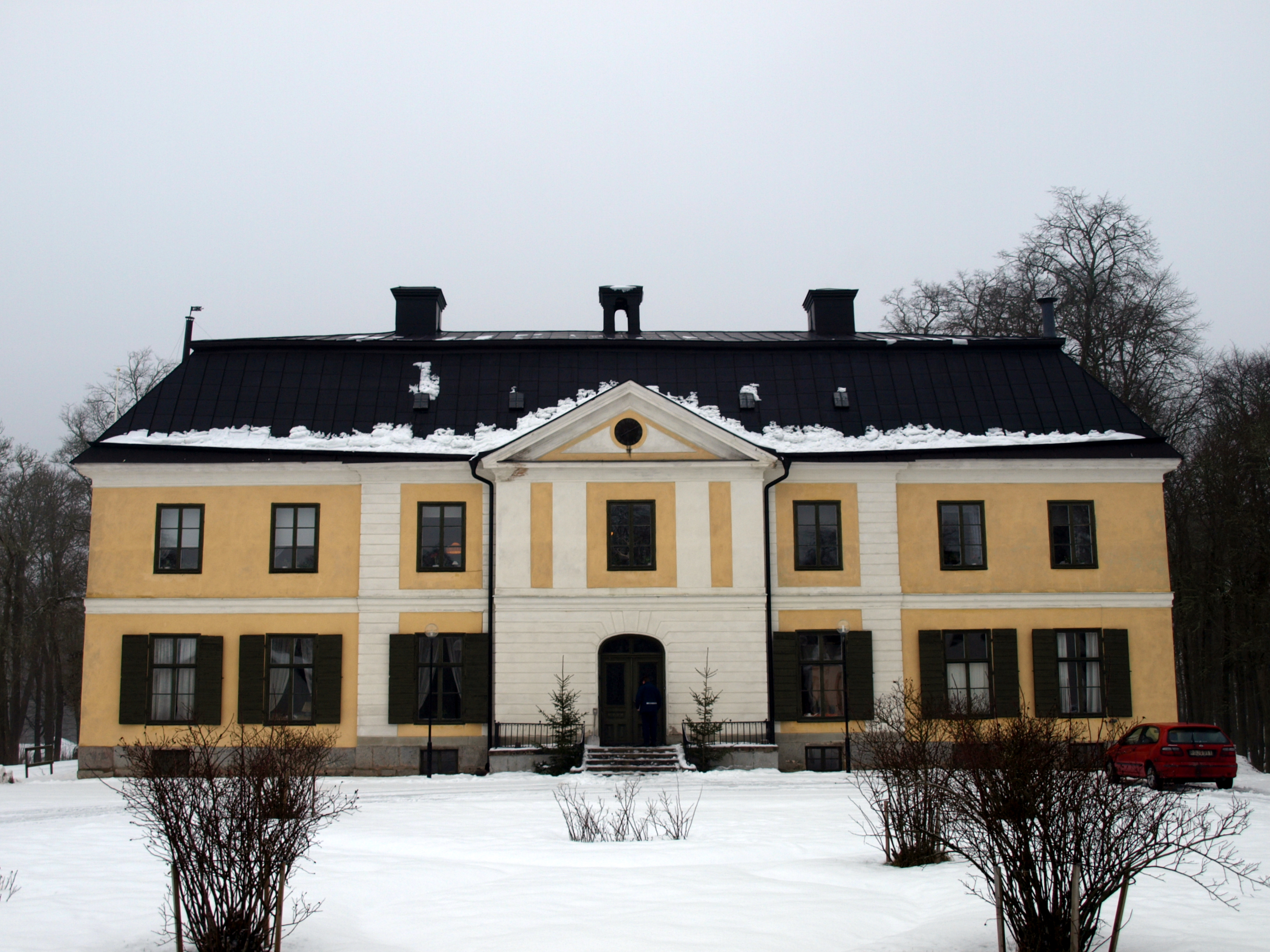
Sätuna Manor

Sätuna Manor (Swedish: Sätuna säteri) is a manor house at Björklinge in Uppsala County, Sweden. The estate is now owned by Sätuna AB.

== History ==
The estate was founded in 1613. An early manor house at the location was destroyed by fire in 1700 and was largely uninhabitable. Otto Fleming (1696-1778), member of the Privy Council of Sweden, demolished the prior buildings in 1748. The present manor house was subsequently built to designs by architect Carl Hårleman (1700–1753). Alterations to the building were made in the 1820s.
