= Ulrica Schönström =

Ulrica Schönström, née Adlersten (1694–1757) was a Swedish baroness and courtier. She was the royal governess of the children of Adolf Frederick, King of Sweden and Louisa Ulrika of Prussia.

She was born to baron Göran Adlersten and Maria Ehrenberg and married in 1715 to Albrekt Schönström (d. 1740). In 1751, she was appointed royal governess to the royal children in succession to Hedvig Elisabet Strömfelt. She was appreciated by the queen who regarded her as dutiful and thoughtful: "she has excellent qualities and are very devoted to my children". After her tenure as governess, she continued in service as hovmästarinna or senior lady in waiting to princess Sophia Albertina of Sweden.

Court offices
Preceded by Hedvig Elisabet Strömfelt	Royal Governess (Sweden)	Succeeded by Hedvig Sofia von Rosen
