= Ordre de l'Harmonie =

Swedish royal dynastic order

Order of Unity
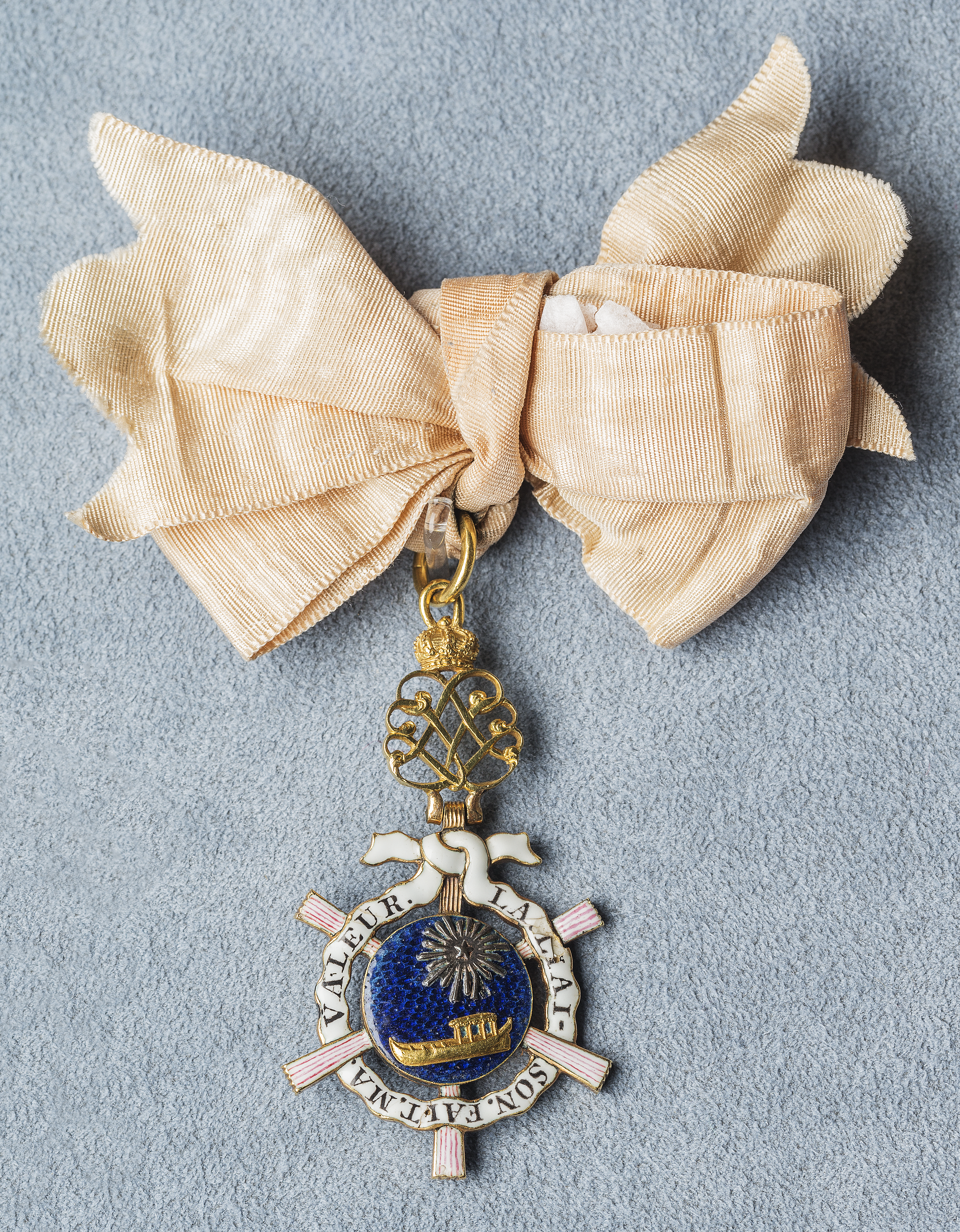
- Badge and sash of the order.

Awarded by Louisa Ulrika of Sweden
- Type: Chivalric order in one class
- Established: August 30, 1744
- Motto: La liaison fait ma valeur La division ma perd
- Status: Disestablished
- Grades: Member

Statistics
- Total inductees: 22
- Order of Unity ribbon

L'Ordre de l'Harmonie (French: "The Order of Unity"), also called Solfjädersorden (Swedish: "The Order of the Hand Fan"), was a Swedish royal dynastic order, founded by Queen Louisa Ulrika of Sweden in 1744. It was awarded to 22 people between 1744 and 1746.

== History ==
On 29 August 1744, the day before the wedding between Louisa Ulrika of Prussia and Adolf Frederick, King of Sweden, the royal company traveled by boat to the wedding on the Drottningholm Palace. On this occasion, Louisa Ulrika accidentally broke her hand fan. Adolf Frederick collected the pieces of the broken fan and distributed them to those present as a memento of the incident, which gave Louisa Ulrika the idea to create the order.

Louisa Ulrika was known for her political ambitions and her order was interpreted, both nationally and internationally, to have the political significance of unity before division, signalling her ambition to abolish the parliamentary system of the Age of Liberty in favor of an absolute monarchy.

== Recipients ==
- Edvard Didrik Taube (1745)
- Herman Cedercreutz (1745)
- Carl Gustaf Tessin
- Ulla Tessin
- Frederick I of Sweden
- Adolf Frederick of Sweden
- Prince Augustus William of Prussia
