= Åkerö =

Apple cultivar

Malus pumila Åkerö
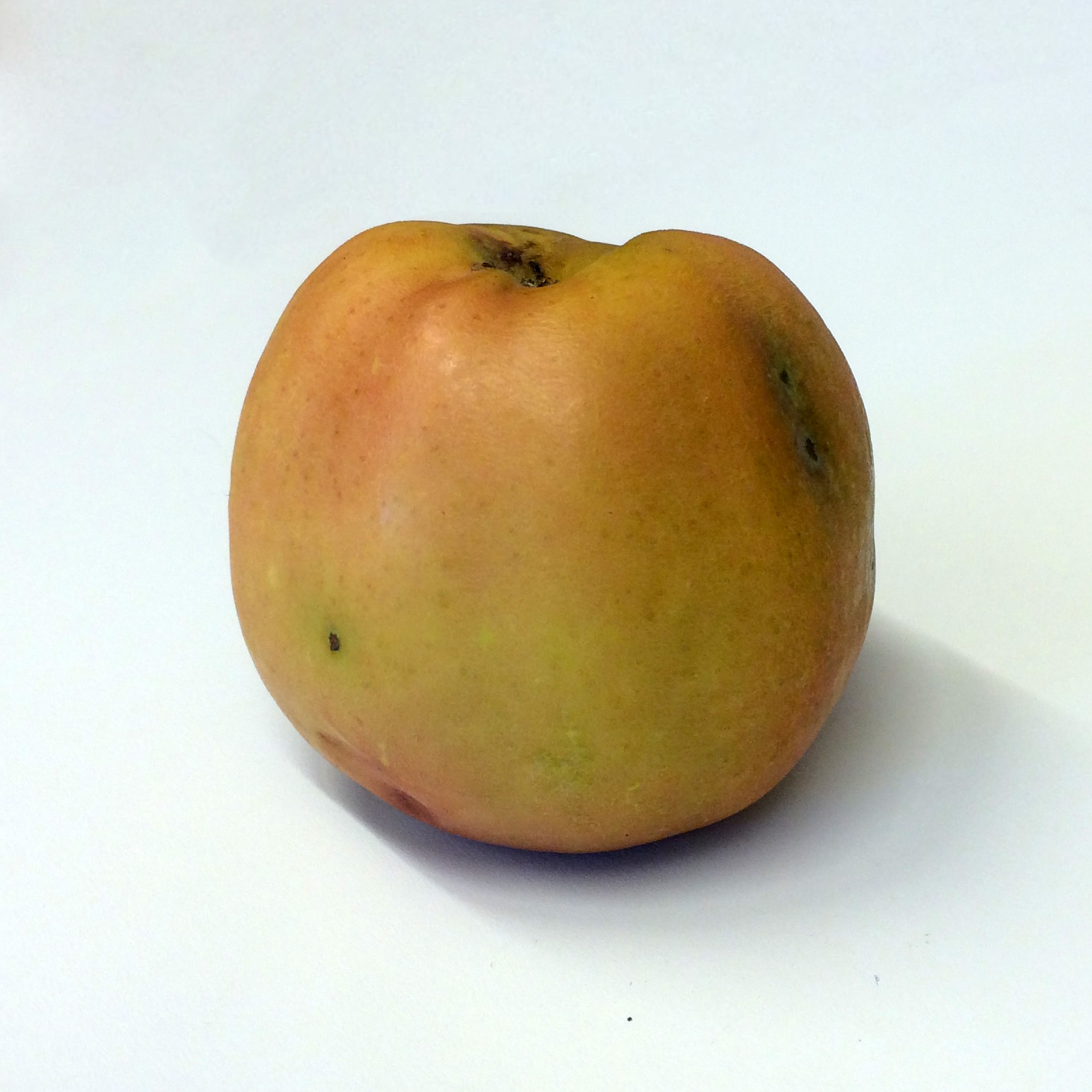
- Photographed in conjunction with the Apple Festival at Nordiska museet, Stockholm, Sweden in September 2014.
- Genus: Malus
- Species: Malus pumila
- Hybrid parentage: Grågylling x Vitgylling
- Cultivar: Åkerö
- Origin: Sweden

Åkerö, also called Akero or Okera, is an old apple cultivar of Swedish origin. It is a dessert apple with an aromatic flavor.

Åkerö was first described by pomologist Olof Eneroth in 1858. It is probably named after the Åkerö Manor located south of Stockholm, Sweden where according to some it was originally found as a seedling. Today it is still cultivated in Sweden and is regarded as the best Swedish apple. It was once very popular in Scandinavia and northern Germany.

The origin of Åkerö has been debated with some suggesting it was imported from the Netherlands in the 18th-hundreds, and others believing it was a local seedling. A study on the genetic relationship of Swedish heirloom apple varieties confirmed the latter. The parents of Åkerö were two older Swedish varieties named Grågylling and Vitgylling.

The tree is hardy and vigorous with an upright growing habit. It needs cross pollination from a compatible cultivar, and gives a good crop of medium- to large-sized oval fruit. The skin color is a pale primrose with pink flush, and the flesh is juicy with a refreshing raspberry-like flavor and a pale cream color.

Åkerö is a autumn apple, the fruits are picked around October and can be stored until February.
