= Hedvig Elisabet Strömfelt =

Swedish courtier (1687–1751)

Hedvig Elisabet Strömfelt (née Wrangel; 1687 — 8 March 1751) was a Swedish courtier. She served as överhovmästarinna to two queens of Sweden, Ulrika Eleonora of Sweden and Louisa Ulrika of Prussia, and as Royal Governess to the royal children. Gustav III of Sweden refers to her with affection and admiration in his writings.

== Life ==
Hedvig Elisabet Strömfelt was the daughter of colonel nobleman Jurgen Johan Wrangel and Margareta Stenbock and married to riksråd count Johan Carl Strömfelt (1678–1736). She became the mother of three children, among them Ulrika Strömfelt.

After having been widowed, Strömfelt was appointed överhovmästarinna (Mistress of the Robes) to Ulrika Eleonora of Sweden in 1736 in succession to Katarina Ebba Horn af Åminne, making her the senior of all the female courtiers, and served until the queen's death in 1741. As such, she was the first in rank of all the female office holders of the royal household with responsibility of the ladies-in-waiting and the performance of court etiquette around them and the queen.

Upon the marriage of the crown prince to Louisa Ulrika of Prussia in 1744, she resumed her post at the court of Louisa Ulrika, and welcomed her with the rest of the late queen's court at Gnatskow in Swedish Pomerania. With experience in Swedish court etiquette, she was able to guide Louisa Ulrika in the new court, and described as having a wise judgement in combination with a lovable and youthful appearance, she gained the confidence of Louisa Ulrika.

Louisa Ulrika described her in a letter to her mother:

"The countess Strömfelt ... is a very good woman and I started on the right foot with her because she does all that I want and is absolutely not irksome. It is the same with all my other ladies-in-waiting. [...] All my ladies-in-waiting are very beautiful and very funny, each of the can take part in a conversation with no risk of ruining it."

From 1746, when the first child was born in the royal house, she also served in the capacity as a royal governess. As royal governess, the queen was concerned that she did not beat the children enough physically, especially the crown prince, Gustav. In his memoirs, Gustav mention her with gratitude and respect.

She served in her two positions until her death on 8 March 1751, when she was succeeded by Ulla Tessin as Mistress of the Robes and by Ulrica Schönström as royal governess.

Court offices
Preceded by Katarina Ebba Horn af Åminne	Överhovmästarinna to the Queen of Sweden; 1736–1751	Succeeded by Ulla Tessin
Preceded by Märta Berendes	Royal Governess (Sweden); 1746–1751	Succeeded by Ulrica Schönström
