= Hedvig Sofia von Rosen =

Swedish countess and courtier

Hedvig Sofia von Rosen, née Stenbock (23 June 1734 – 26 December 1809) was a Swedish countess and courtier. She was the överhovmästarinna (royal governess) of the future Gustav IV Adolf of Sweden in 1778–1781, and for his brother Prince Carl Gustav, Duke of Småland in 1782–1783.

== Life ==
Hedvig Sofia von Rosen was the daughter of count Fredrik Magnus Stenbock, lantråd of Estonia, and Ebba Margareta De la Gardie, and married count Fredrik Ulrik von Rosen in 1756, with whom she had five children.

She was appointed statsfru to the queen, Sophia Magdalena of Denmark. Hedvig Elisabeth Charlotte of Holstein-Gottorp describe her in her famous journal as well educated and sensible. At the birth of the crown prince in 1778, she was appointed head royal governess, with the title överhovmästarinna, and the responsibility of the upbringing and the court of the royal child, consisting of two deputies (Brita Ebba Celestina von Stauden and Maria Aurora Uggla), two maids of honour (one her daughter Ebba Ulrika Beata von Rosen) and two kammarfru.

During the trip of the king to the continent in 1780–1781, von Rosen was given a complete power of attorney by the monarch to make any decisions as she saw fit regarding the crown prince during his absence. When the king fell ill abroad and there were fears that he would die, which would mean a minor regency for the crown prince, von Rosen took the crown prince from Ulriksdal Palace to Stockholm on her own initiative. According to rumor, she had been advised to do so by the Governor of Stockholm, Sparre, to avoid the queen dowager, Louisa Ulrika of Prussia, from taking custody of the crown prince and thereby the regency in the event of the king's death. There were real fears of a coup by the queen dowager at this point, and Adolf Fredrik Munck reportedly also prepared to escape abroad in the event of Louisa Ulrika taking over the regency of the crown prince in the event of the king's death. The feared coup was avoided as the king soon recovered. Hedvig Elisabeth Charlotte commented in her journal, that it was an extraordinary measure of von Rosen to move her royal charge at that point, but that she had the legal right to do so by the power of attorney from the king and that it would not have been necessary for her to be advised to do so by Sparre.

In 1781, the crown prince was upon the decision of his father the king declared free from the upbringing of women and turned over to male tutors, thereby dissolving his court of ladies-in-waiting (male members of the royal family had female courtiers only as children), despite the protests of the queen, who had preferred if the crown prince had been treated as a child a couple of years more. The year after, von Rosen filled the same office again upon the birth of the next prince, Prince Carl Gustav, Duke of Småland, but he died the following year.

Court offices
Preceded by Ulrica Schönström	Royal Governess (Sweden); 1778-1783	Succeeded by Hedvig Ulrika De la Gardie
