= Prince Augustus William of Prussia =

Son of King Frederick William I of Prussia (1722–1758)

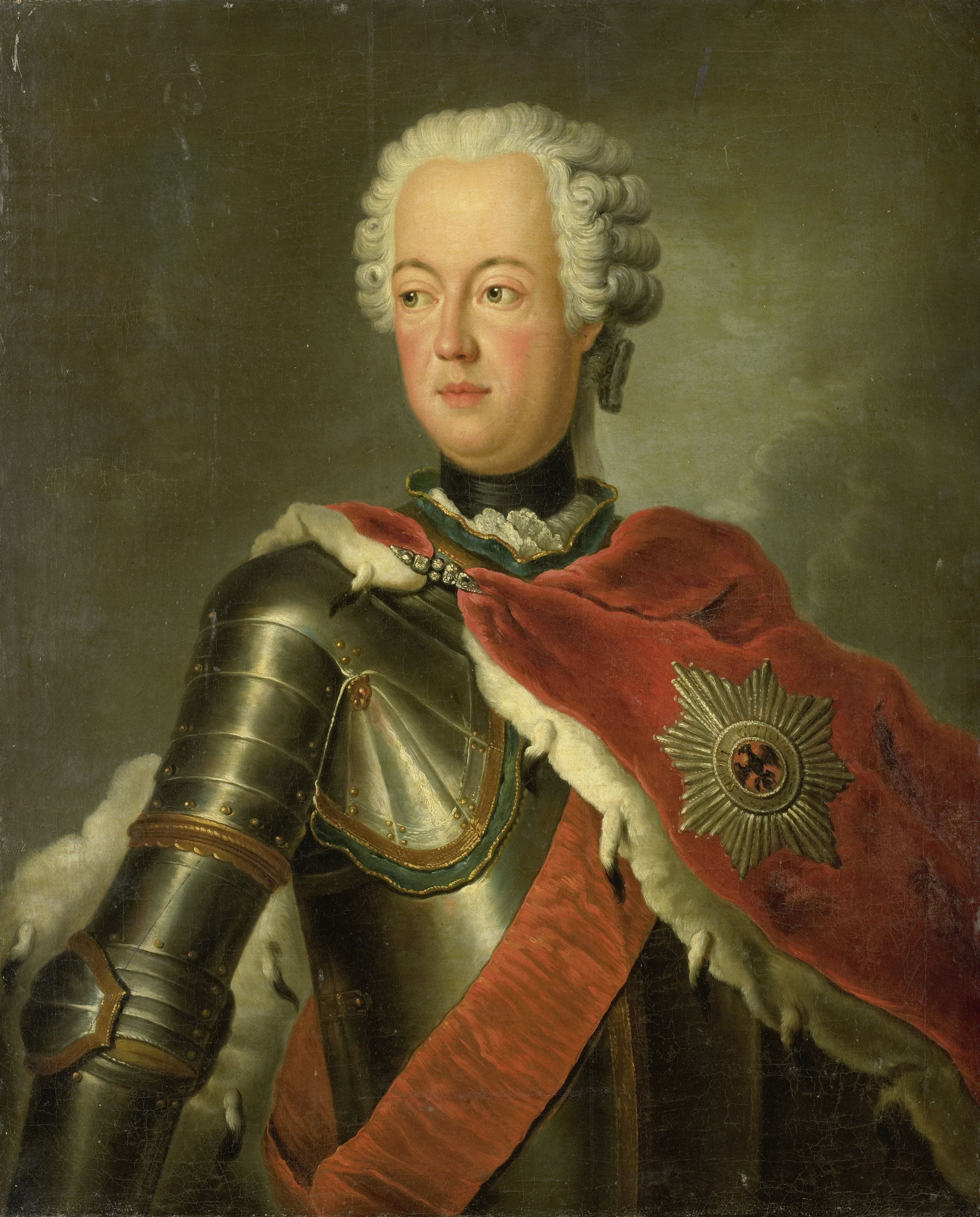
- Portrait by Antoine Pesne
- Born: 9 August 1722; Stadtschloss, Berlin, Prussia
- Died: 12 June 1758 (aged 35); Oranienburg, Prussia
- Burial: Berlin Cathedral
- Spouse: Luise of Brunswick-Wolfenbüttel (m. 1742)
- Issue: Frederick William II of Prussia; Prince Henry; Wilhelmina, Princess of Orange; Prince Emil
- House: Hohenzollern
- Father: Frederick William I of Prussia
- Mother: Sophia Dorothea of Hanover

Prince Augustus William of Prussia (German: August Wilhelm; 9 August 1722 – 12 June 1758) was the son of King Frederick William I of Prussia and a younger brother and general of Frederick the Great.

Augustus was the second surviving son of Frederick William I and Sophia Dorothea. His older siblings included Wilhelmina (later Margravine of Bayreuth), Frederick II (later King of Prussia), Friedrike Louise (later Margravine of Ansbach) and Louisa Ulrika (later Queen consort of Sweden).

Augustus was favored by his father over Frederick and was popular at the Prussian court. When his brother Frederick became king in 1740, Augustus became heir presumptive and moved into Fredrick's former residence, the Crown Prince's Palace in Berlin. When his older sister Louisa Ulrika married the King of Sweden in 1744, she founded the Ordre de l'Harmonie, of which Augustus was one of the first recipients.

Augustus served his brother as a general in the War of the Austrian Succession and distinguished himself in the Battle of Hohenfriedberg. But in the Seven Years' War, owing to the fatal retreat of Zittau during the Battle of Kolin in 1757, he incurred the wrath of his brother the King, and withdrew from the army. This conflict between the two brothers led to a correspondence, which was published in 1769.

== Death ==
Augustus died suddenly in 1758 at Oranienburg, according to some of "a broken heart", in reference to his brother Frederick II's harsh treatment of him for his incompetent military leadership in the Battle of Kolin. In reality, he died from a brain tumor.

== Marriage ==
Augustus married Luise of Brunswick-Wolfenbüttel. Because his older brother had no children, Augustus's oldest son inherited the throne as Frederick William II of Prussia on Frederick's death.

== Issue ==
- Frederick William II of Prussia (1744–1797)
  - married (1) Elisabeth Christine Ulrike of Brunswick-Wolfenbüttel. They had one child Princess Frederica Charlotte of Prussia (1767–1820), who married Prince Frederick, Duke of York and Albany, the second son of George III of the United Kingdom.
  - married (2) Frederica Louisa of Hesse-Darmstadt and had issue.
- Prince Henry of Prussia (1747–1767) died unmarried.
- Princess Wilhelmina of Prussia (1751–1820) married William V, Prince of Orange and had issue.
- Prince Emil of Prussia (30 October 1758 – 15 February 1759) died in infancy.

== Ancestry ==
Ancestors of Prince Augustus William of Prussia

8. Frederick William, Elector of Brandenburg
4. Frederick I of Prussia
9. Louise Henriette of Orange-Nassau
2. Frederick William I of Prussia
10. Ernest Augustus, Elector of Hanover
5. Sophia Charlotte of Hanover
11. Sophia of the Palatinate
1. Prince Augustus William of Prussia
12. Ernest Augustus, Elector of Hanover (= 10)
6. George I of Great Britain
13. Sophia of the Palatinate (= 11)
3. Sophia Dorothea of Hanover
14. George William, Duke of Brunswick-Lüneburg
7. Sophia Dorothea of Celle
15. Éléonore Desmier d'Olbreuse

== See also ==
- German nobility
- Junker
