= Tureholm Castle =

Swedish castle

Coordinates: 58°53′46″N 17°30′48″E

- Sweden
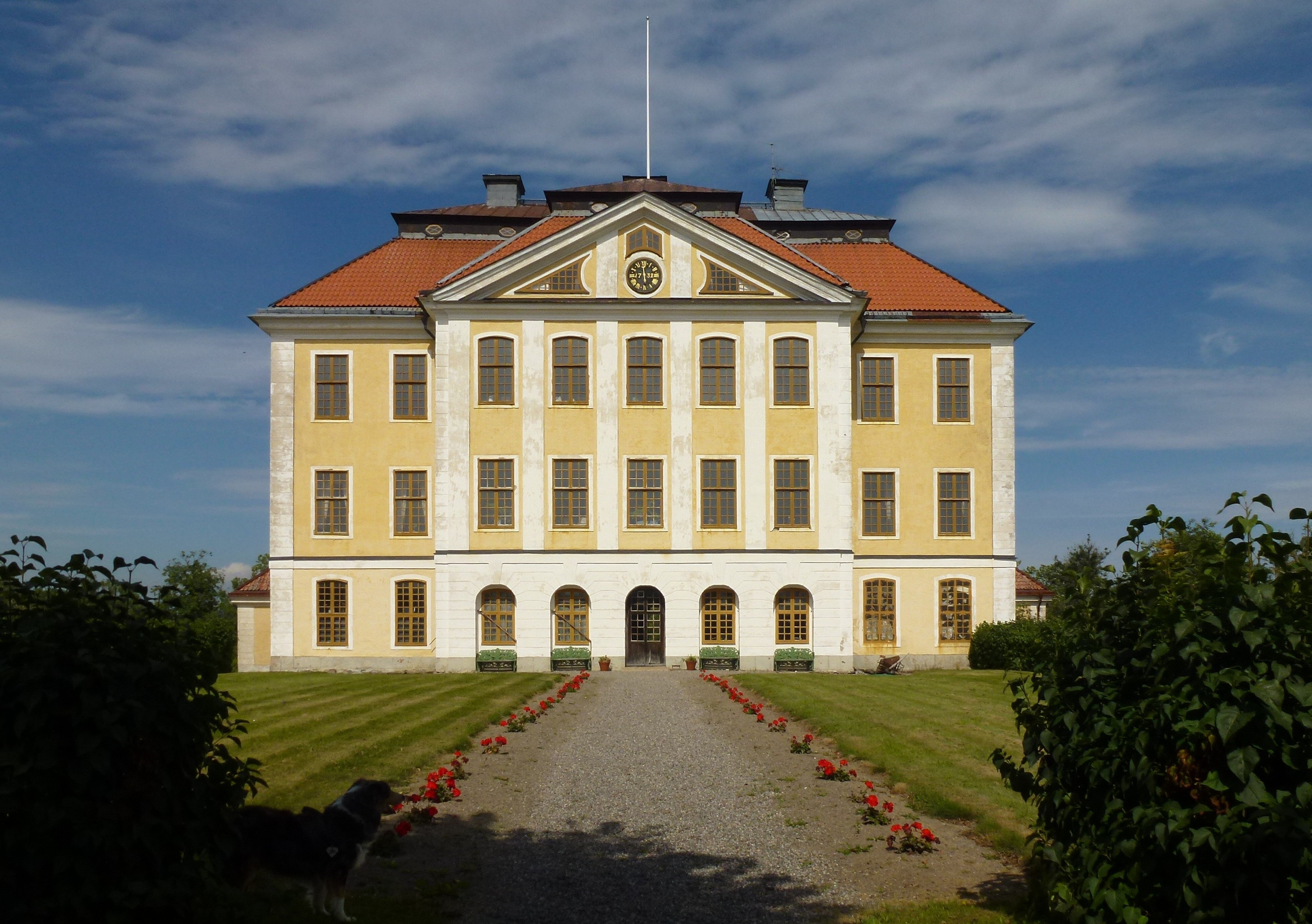
- Tureholms castle from the south side

Site information
- Type: Castle
- Owner: Bonde family

Site history
- Built: 1640, 1728–1745
- Built by: Erik Dahlberg; Carl Hårleman
- Demolished: 1719

Tureholm Castle is a privately owned castle in Trosa Municipality in Sweden. The castle was built in the 18th century, and is a listed building since 1987.

== History ==
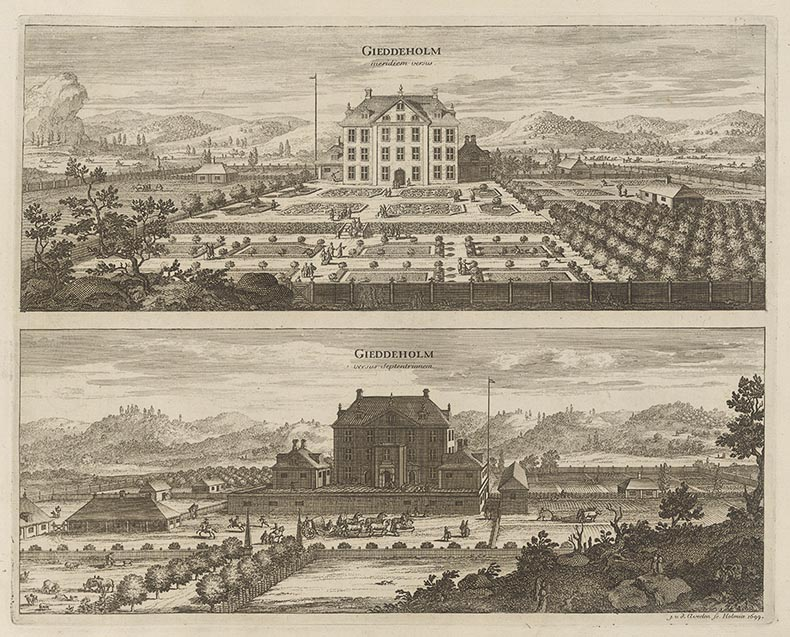
Gäddeholm slott in 1690's in Suecia antiqua et hodierna by Erik Dahberg.

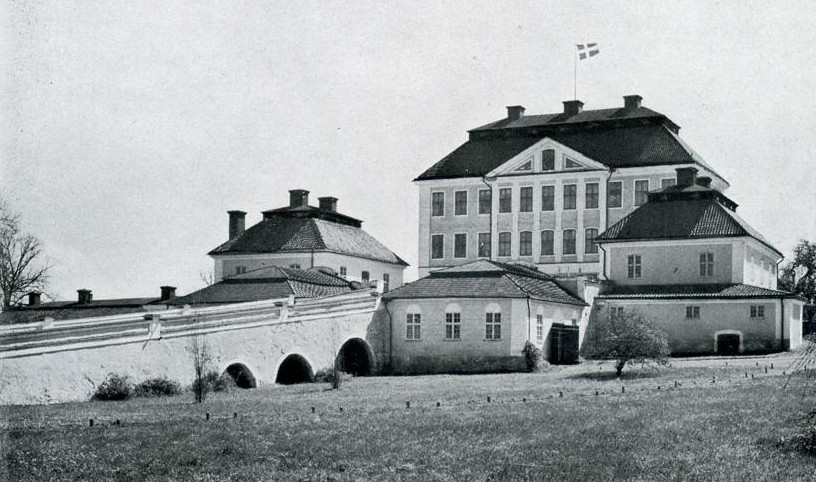
Tureholms Castle in the 1930s.

Tureholm is situated on the location of the original castle that belonged to the nobleman Nils Gädda in the 1300s, and hence received its first name, Gäddeholm. In the 1640s, a new castle was built by Erik Dahlberg, commissioned by Sten Nilsson Bielke. The castle burned down during the Russian fires in 1719.

Ten years after the Russian fires, Privy Councellor Thure Gabriel Bielke began to build the castle again in 1728 with architect Carl Hårleman. The building was finished by 1745. Since then it has looked like it does today, it is also after him that the castle has been named Tureholm.

In Suecia Antiqua et Hodierna, one can see the castle that burned down and conclude that the castle we see today is quite similar to what was before, but without a similarly well-maintained park. The castle came by marriage between Svante Nilsson's (Sture) grandson's daughter Sigrid and Thure Pedersson Bielke (1562) to attend the Bielke family, which then held it until 1916. Since 1935, the castle is owned by the Bonde family and is a private home.

=== Present day ===
There is a large library and family portrait in the castle. A large collection of weapons from the late 16th century, together with much of the furniture, has however been sold from the castle.

== See also ==
- List of castles in Sweden
- Suecia Antiqua et Hodierna
