= Carl Hårleman =

Swedish architect (1700–1753)

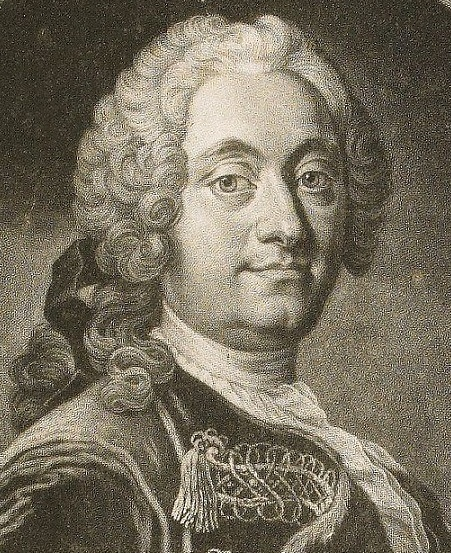
- Portrait of Hårleman by Johann Jakob Haid, from a painting by Olof Arenius, c. 1750s
- Born: August 27, 1700; Stockholm, Sweden
- Died: February 9, 1753 (aged 52)
- Occupation: Architect
- Notable work: Åkerö Manor, Hörningsholm Castle, Stockholm Observatory, Tureholm Castle
- Spouse: Henrika Juliana Lieven (m. 1748)

Baron Carl Hårleman (27 August 1700 – 9 February 1753) was a Swedish architect.

== Biography ==
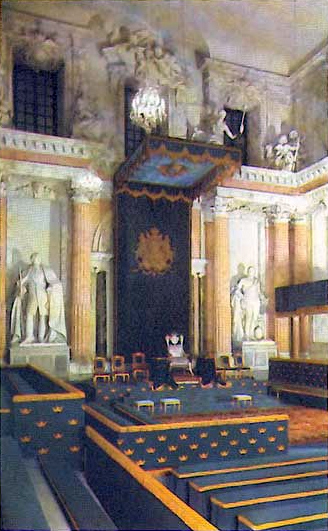
The Hall of State at the Royal Palace in Stockholm

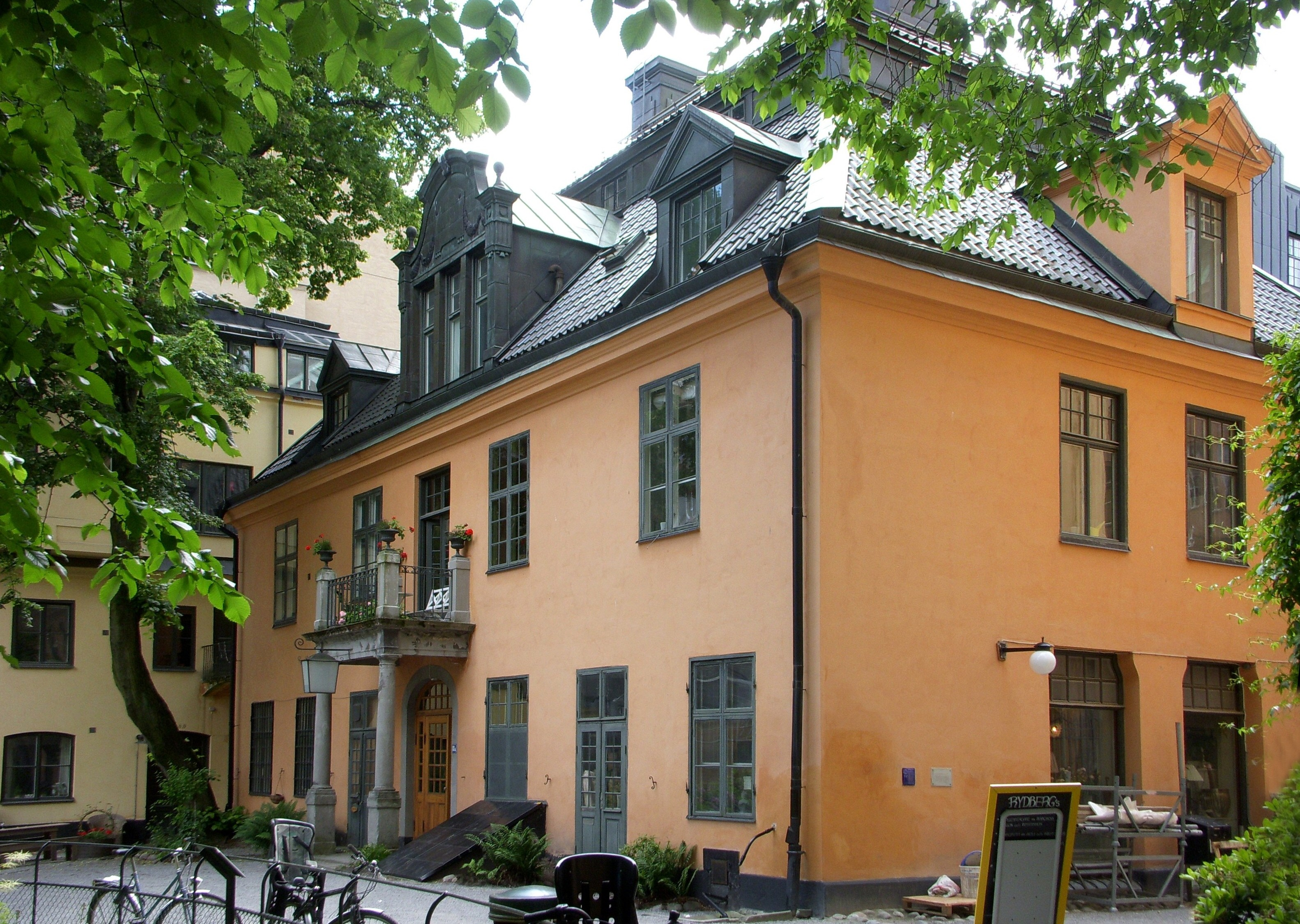
Hårlemanska malmgården in Stockholm

Hårleman was born in Stockholm, son of the garden architect and head of the royal parks and gardens Johan Hårleman, who had been ennobled in 1698. He began his architectural training under Göran Josua Adelcrantz (1668–1739). After receiving a state scholarship, he left Sweden for studies abroad in 1721, first going to Paris, where he spent four years as a student at the Royal French Academy of Architecture and the French Academy of Art. He later continued to Italy and was called back to Sweden while in Venice in 1727.

In 1728, upon the death of Nicodemus Tessin the Younger, Hårleman was appointed court intendant and subsequently in 1741, after Tessin's son Carl Gustaf Tessin had been made a member of the privy council, his successor as court superintendent. He was elected member of the Royal Swedish Academy of Sciences in 1744, was created a baron in 1747 and appointed Master of Ceremonies of the Royal Orders in 1748. Hårleman completed the Royal Palace in Stockholm, begun by Nicodemus Tessin the younger after fire had destroyed the medieval castle, in 1697. He was particularly responsible for the interiors and employed a large number of qualified artisans for the work. The work on the interiors of the palace had a beneficial effect on the state of furniture-making and other crafts in Sweden and helped introduce the rococo style to the country.

Hårleman restored Uppsala Cathedral and parts of Uppsala Castle, both of which had been severely damaged in the Uppsala city fire of 1702, with the ruins of the castle having also been used as a quarry for the palace project in Stockholm. On behalf of Uppsala University, he built the Consistory House (konsistoriehuset) and the conservatory building for the botanical garden of Linnaeus.

== Personal life ==
Hårlemanska malmgården at 88A Drottninggatan in central Stockholm was the Hårleman family house. The property was owned in the late 1600s by Carl Hårleman's father Johan Hårleman. The house was rebuilt and fitted with a new interior in 1748 by Carl Hårleman in connection with his wedding.

In 1748, he married socialite and lady-in-waiting Henrika Juliana von Liewen (1709–1779). Hårleman died in 1753 and was buried in the Klara Church in Stockholm. His last great work, made in the year of his death, was to design the new church in Landskrona, later named Sofia Albertina Church.

== Works ==
Among his other works are Fredrikshov Palace, Stockholm (1731), the Orangery, Linnaean Garden, Uppsala (1744), the main tower of the Holmen industrial works, Norrköping (1750), the Sätuna manor near Uppsala (1752), the Stockholm Observatory (1753), Hörningsholm Castle (c. 1746) in Mörkö in the Södertälje Municipality, and the "King's Gate" (1748), Tureholm Castle (1740s) in Trosa Municipality, Åkerö manor house (1752–1757) (completed by Carl Gustaf Tessin after Hårleman's death) in Södermanland, and the royal entrance to the Sveaborg island fortress off Helsinki, in Finland (then part of the Kingdom of Sweden), and which was featured on the Finnish 1000 FIM banknote issued in 1986.

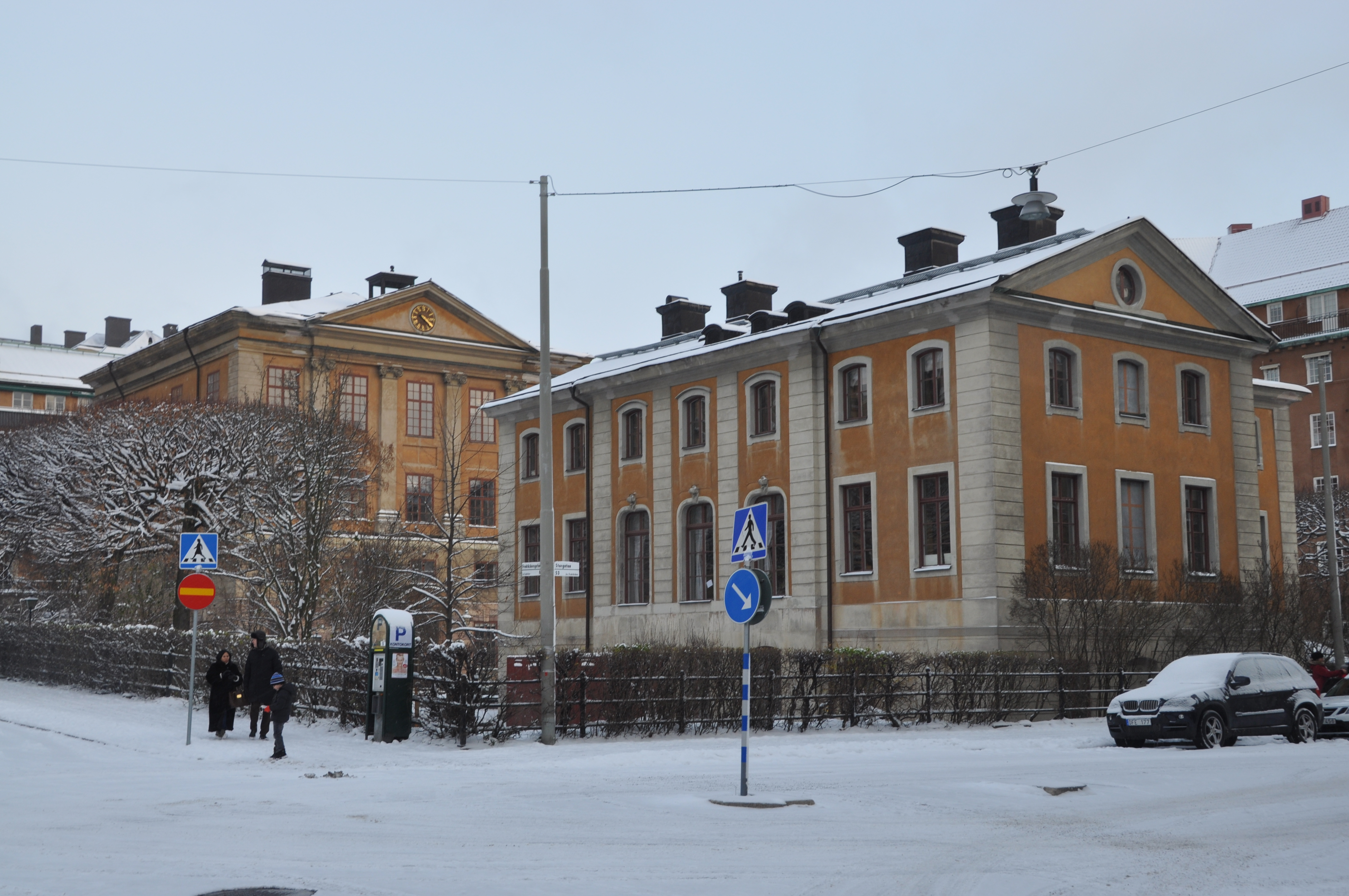
Fredrikshov Palace, Stockholm (1731)

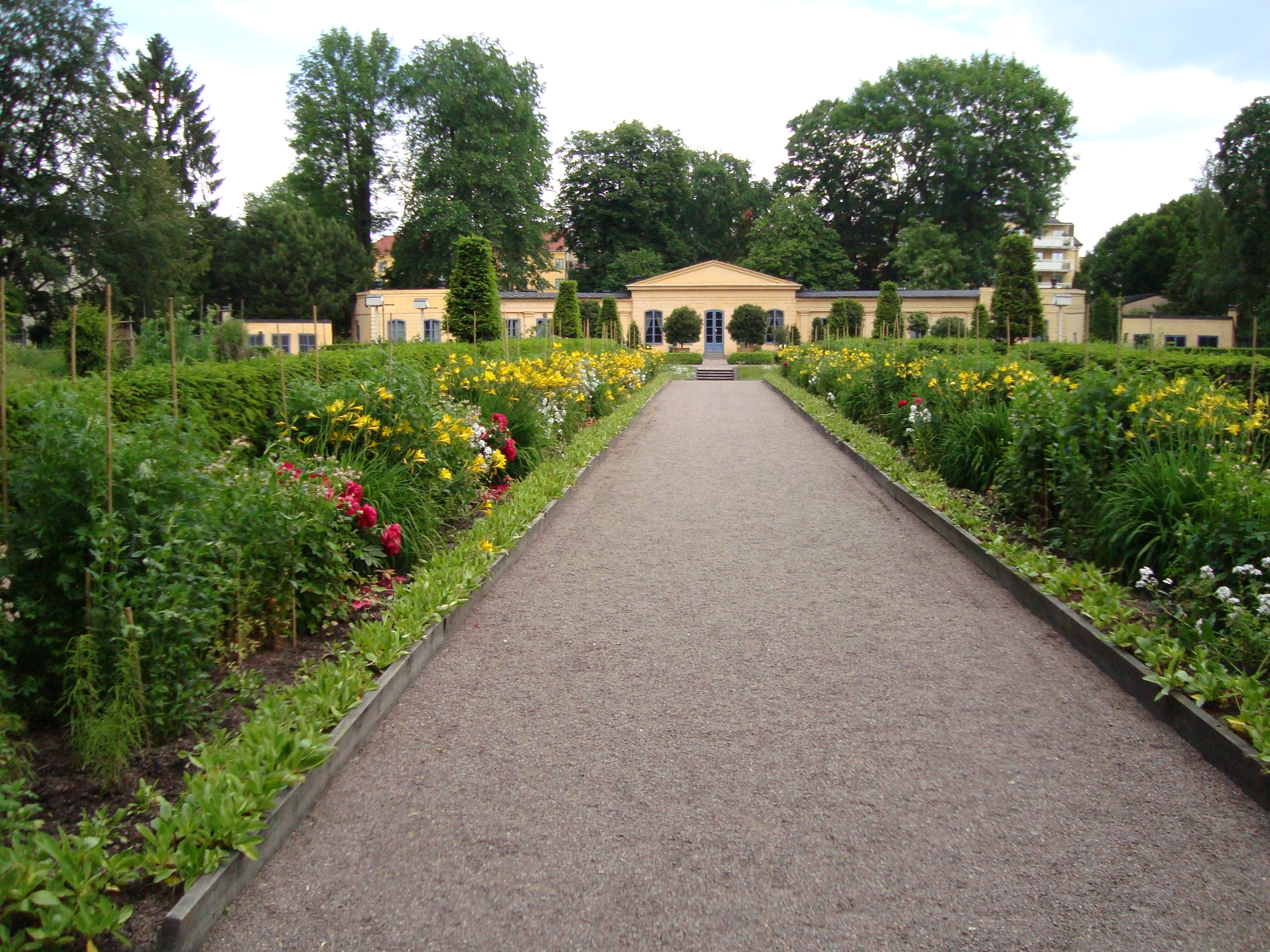
Orangery, Linnaean Garden, Uppsala (1744)

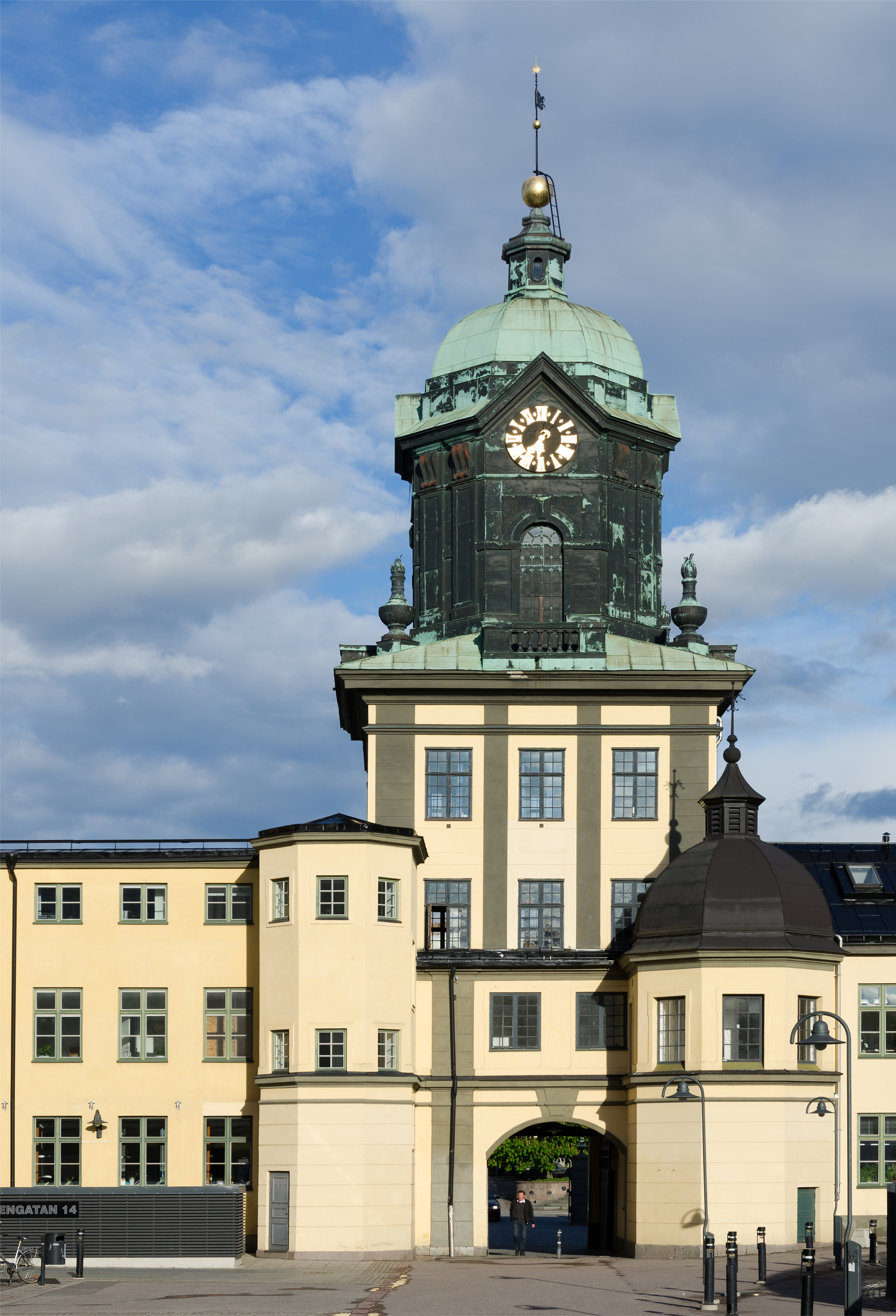
Holmen tower, industrial works, Norrköping (1750)

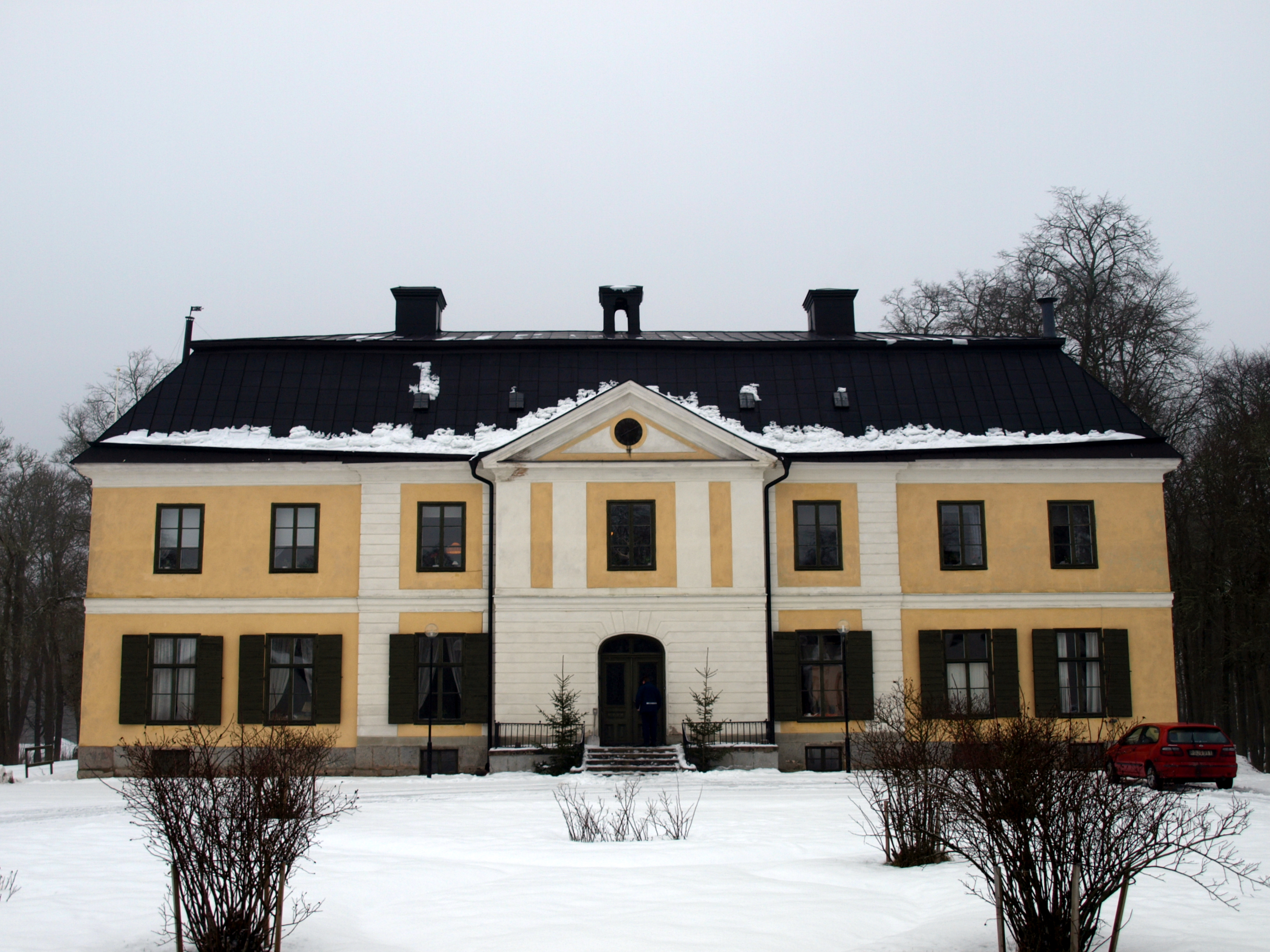
Sätuna Manor near Uppsala (1740s?)

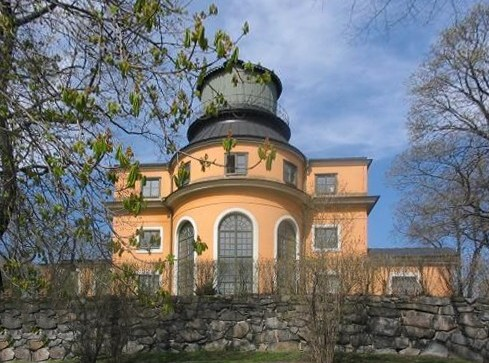
Old Observatory, Stockholm (1753)

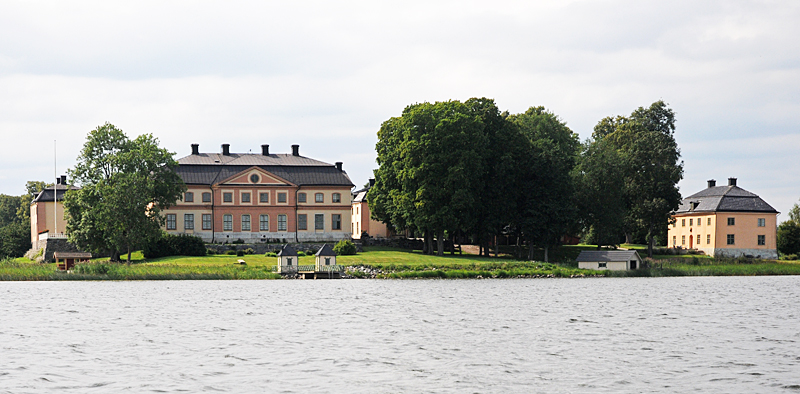
Åkerö manor, Södermanland (1752–57)

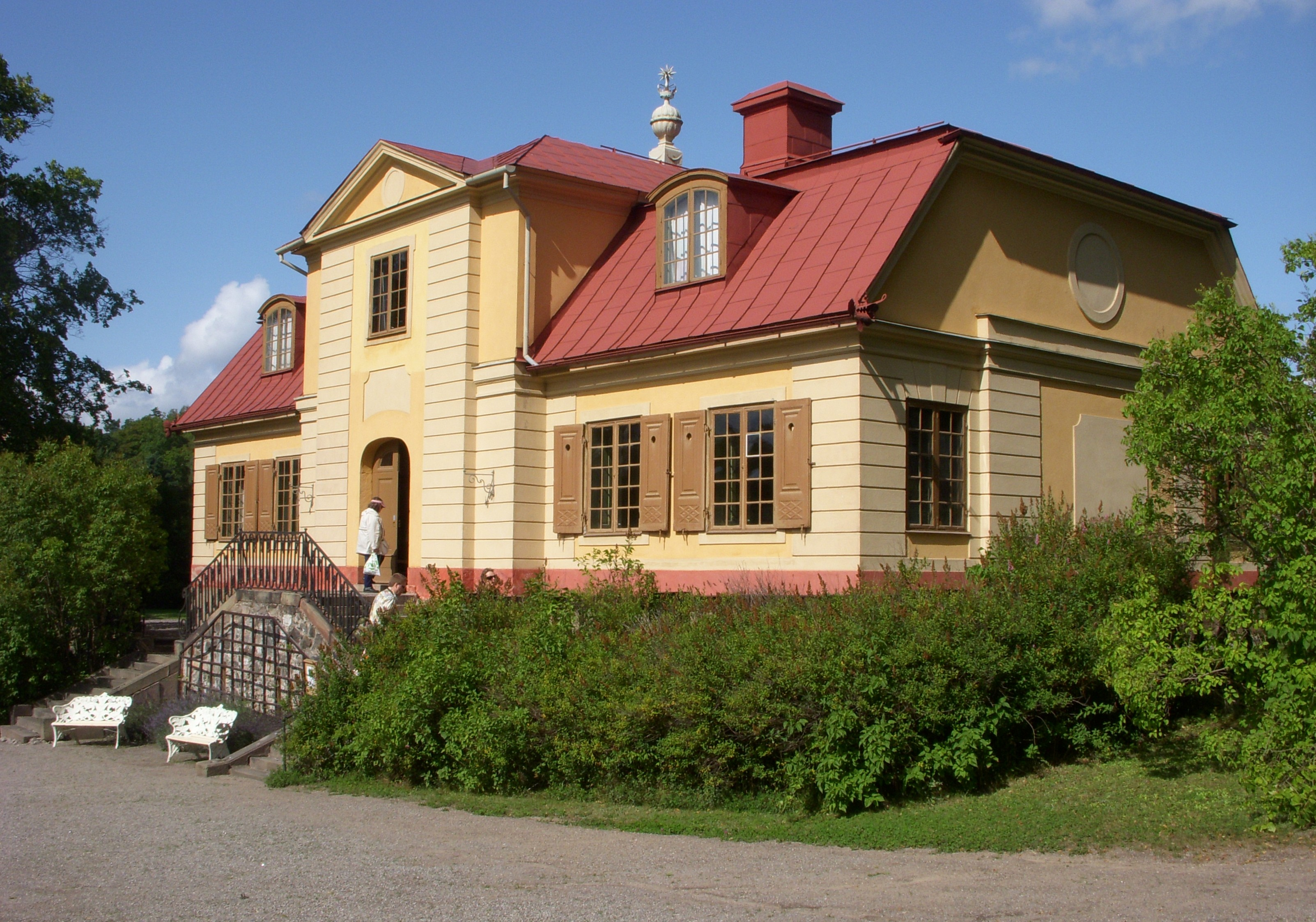
Svindersvik summer residence, Nacka (1740s)

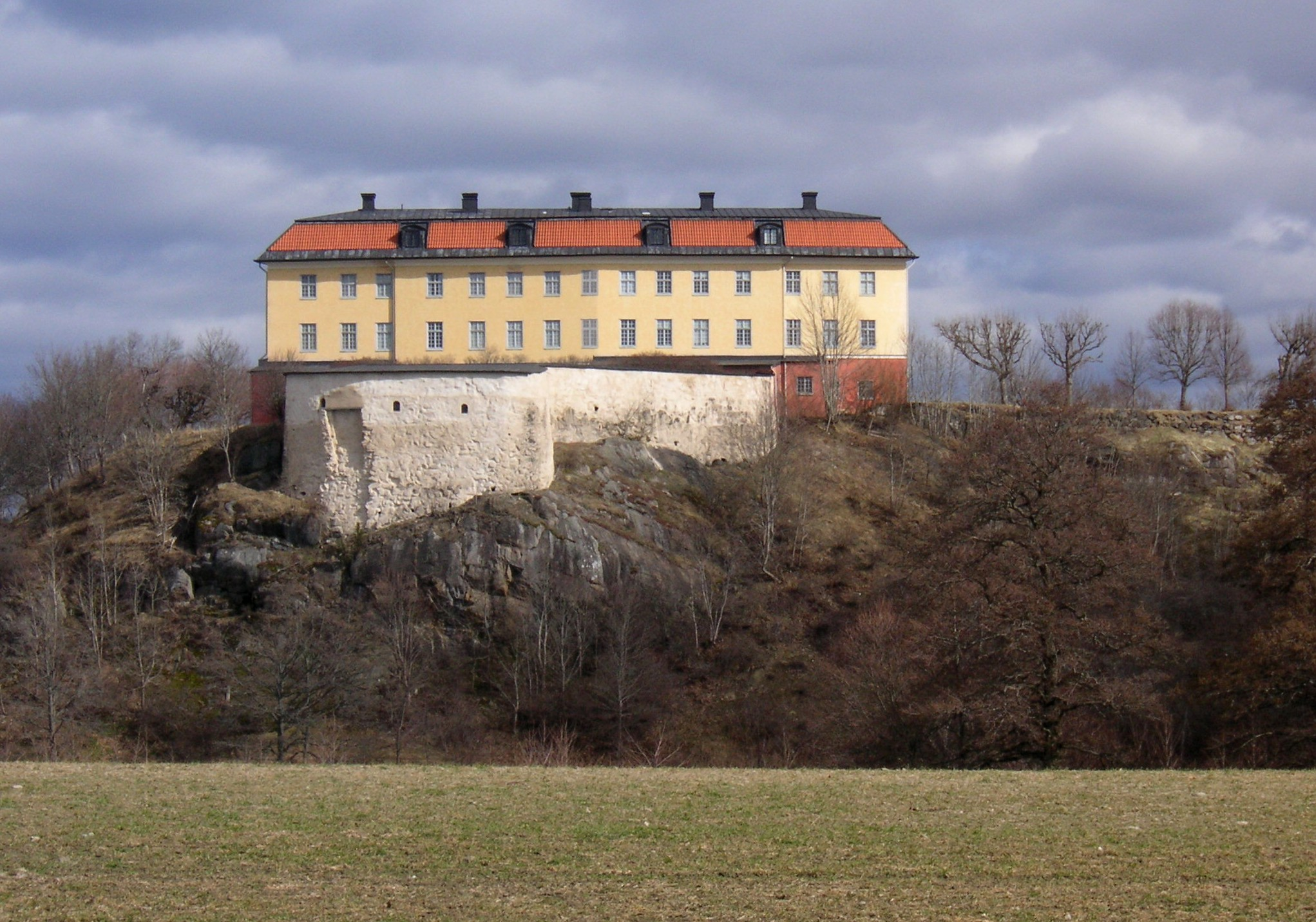
Hörningsholm Castle, Mörkö (c. 1746)

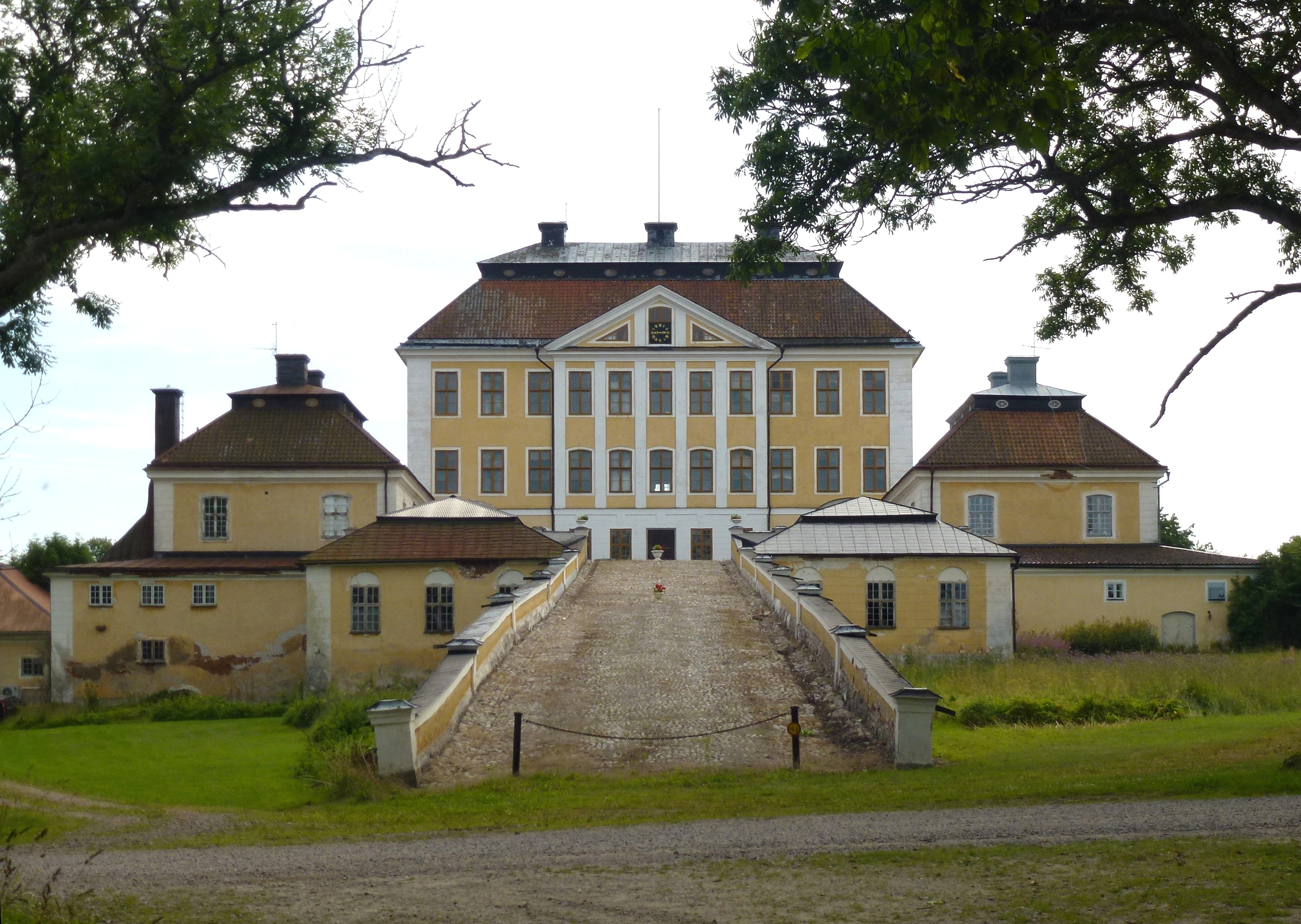
Tureholm Castle (1740s)

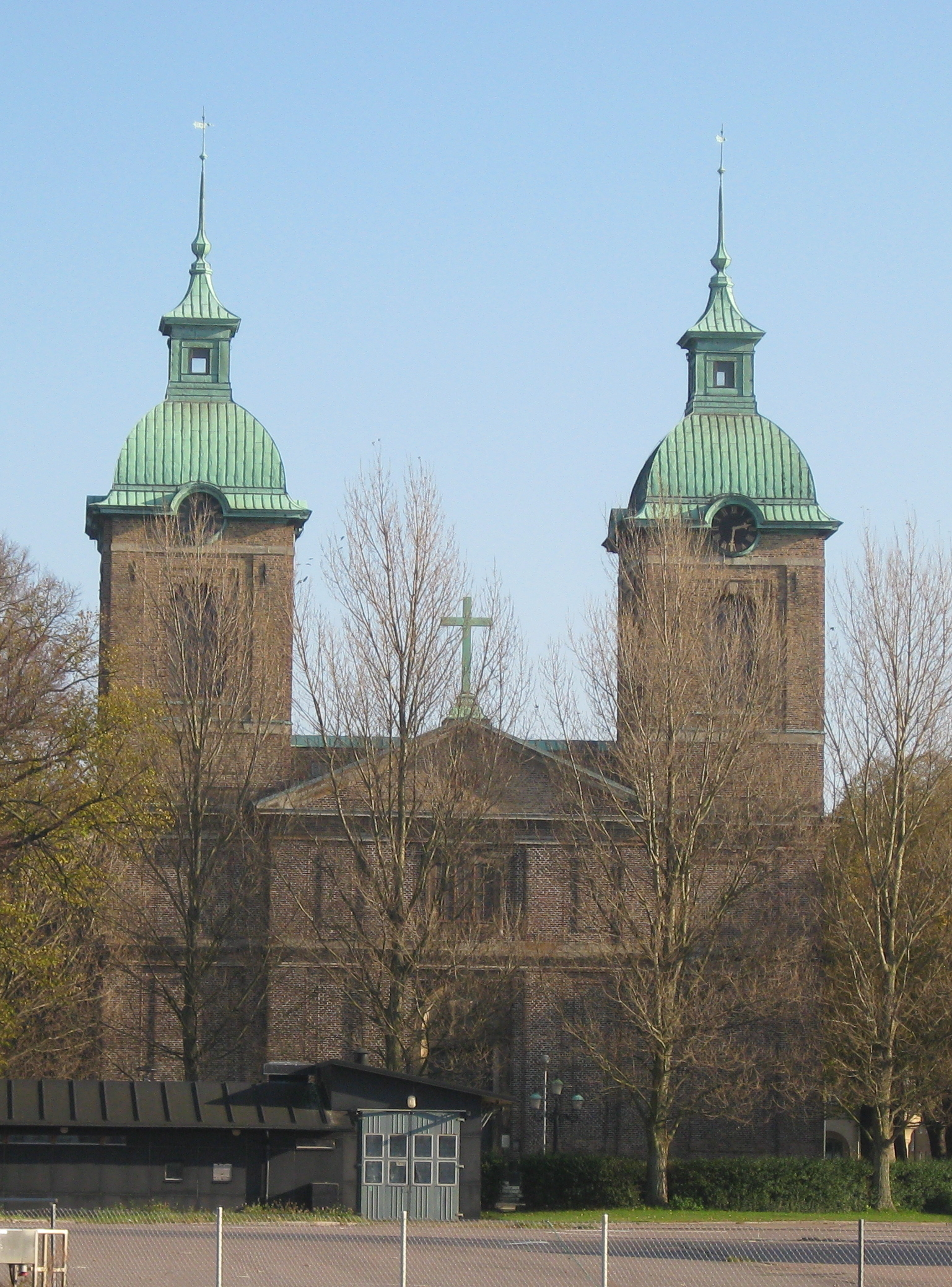
Sofia Albertina Church, Landskrona (1753)
