= Carl Gustaf Tessin =

Swedish nobleman and politician (1695–1770)

Count Carl Gustaf Tessin
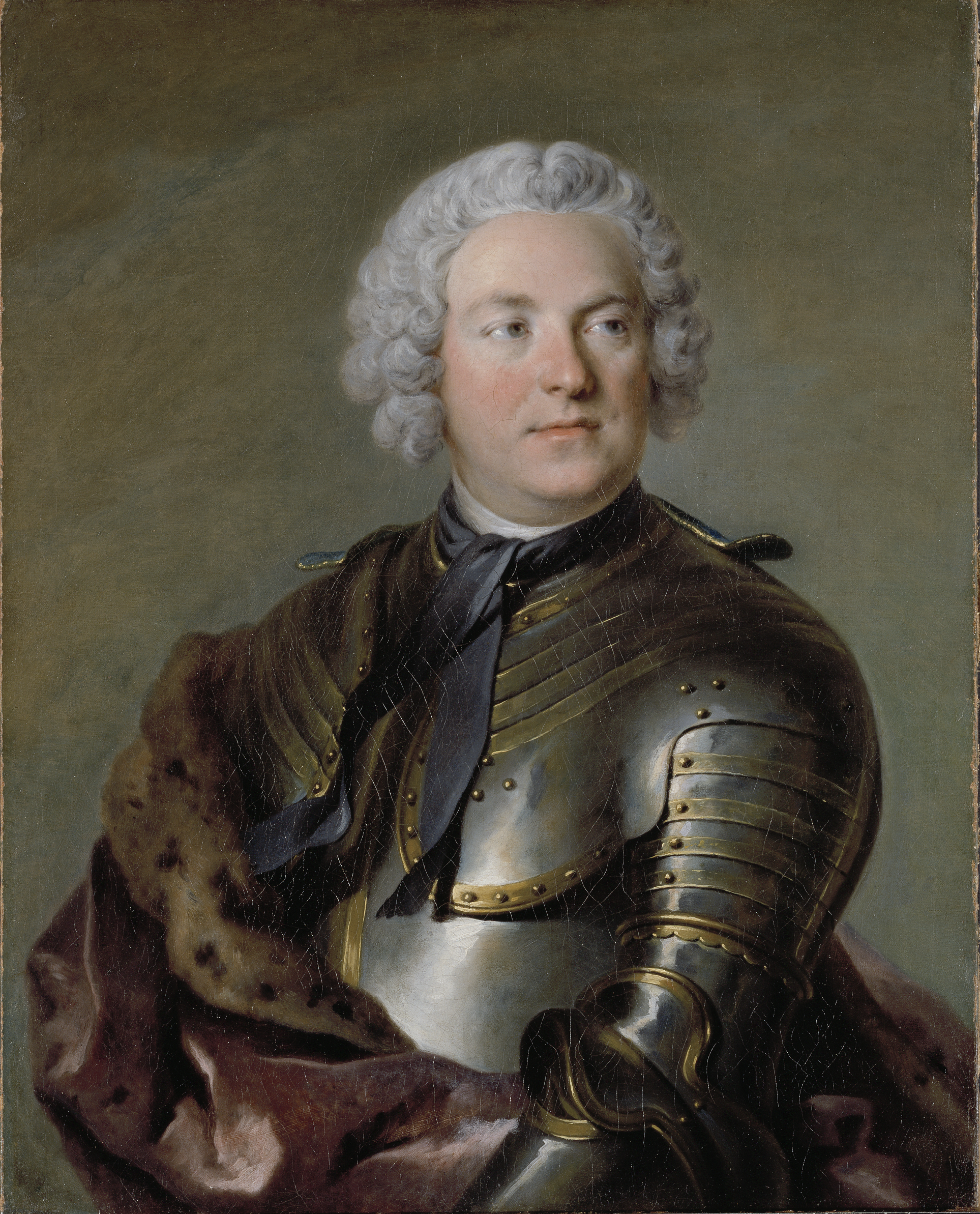
- Portrait by Louis Tocqué, 1741
- Born: 5 September 1695; Stockholm, Sweden
- Died: 7 January 1770 (aged 74); Åkerö Manor, Sweden
- Spouse: Ulrika Sparre
- Father: Nicodemus Tessin the Younger
- Mother: Hedvig Eleonora Stenbock
- Occupation: Diplomat; art collector

Count Carl Gustaf Tessin (5 September 1695 – 7 January 1770) was a Swedish count and politician and son of architect Nicodemus Tessin the Younger and Hedvig Eleonora Stenbock. He was one of the most brilliant personages of his day, and the most prominent representative of French culture in Sweden. He was also often considered a fine orator.

Carl Gustaf Tessin began his public career in 1723 and was quickly noted for his eloquence and diplomacy. In 1725, he was appointed ambassador to Vienna, and upon his return became prominent in the Riksdag of the Estates, challenging the government. From 1739 to 1742, Tessin served as ambassador to France, and proved able to improve Franco-Swedish relations as ambassador; Tessin was considered a friend of the French monarchy during his tenure.

During his time in Versailles, Carl Gustaf Tessin was noted for his cultural patronage, sponsoring numerous artists and musicians. Upon his return to Stockholm, he continued his work in his native country, building one of Sweden's largest art collections; Tessin's art collection, along with that of his king, Gustav III, became the original core of the collection of Sweden's Nationalmuseum.

Carl Gustaf Tessin died at his country estate, Åkerö Manor, in 1770; he made numerous contributions to the development of Swedish culture throughout his life.

== Life ==
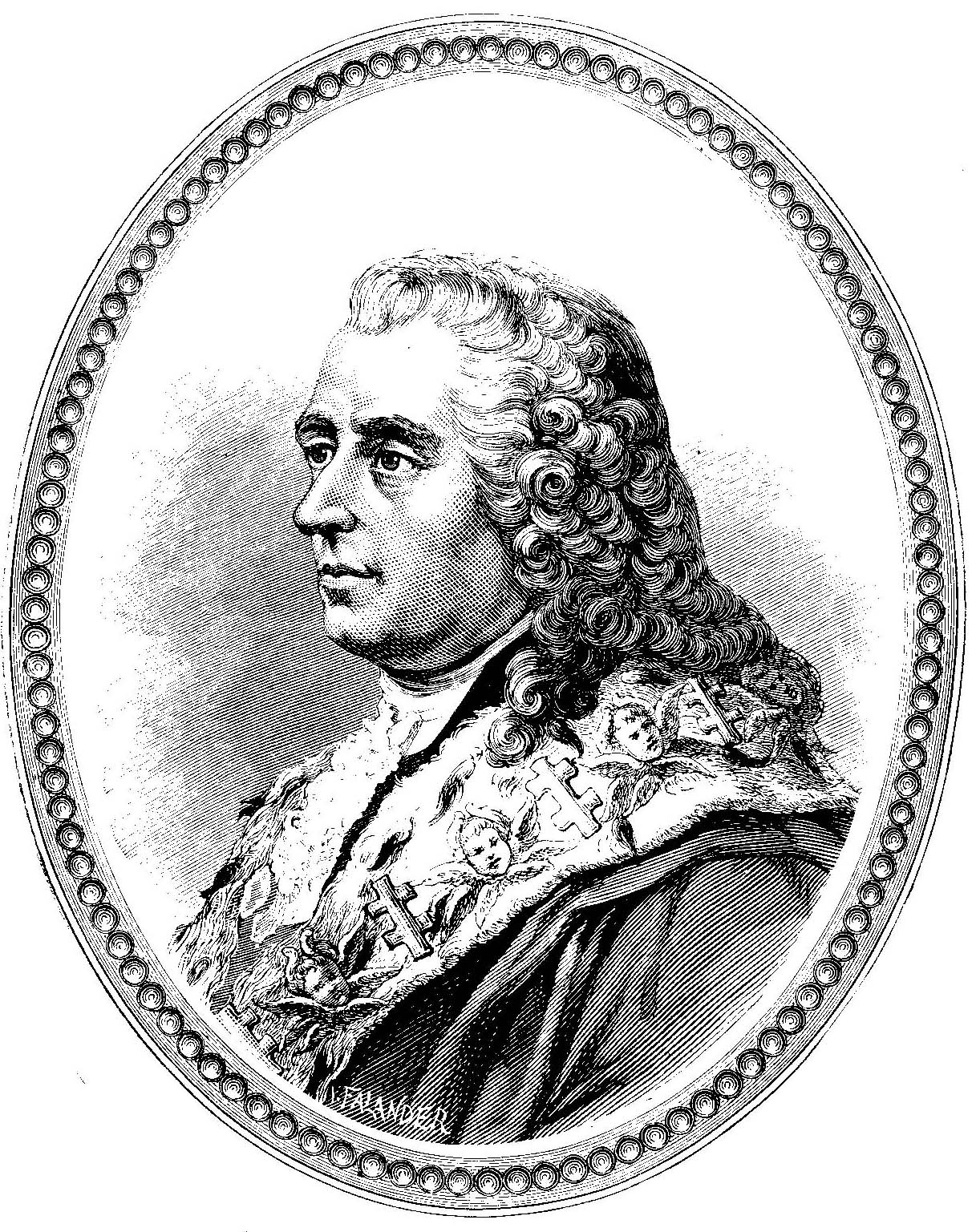
Carl Gustaf Tessin (1695–1770)

Carl Gustaf Tessin was born in Stockholm, where his father was an influential royal architect. His father's family were burghers, while his mother came from the nobility; one of his maternal great-great-grandmothers had been born a princess-duchess of Brunswick-Luneburg. This genealogy led some to regard him as "trash" and a social climber compared to real aristocracy. On the other hand, members of his paternal line had shown high talent artistically and aesthetically; designers, architects, and also political talent. He married Ulrika Sparre in 1727.

He began his public career in 1723, at which time he was a member of the Holstein faction, which promoted the claims of the young Duke Carl Frederick of Holstein to the Swedish throne. In 1725 Tessin was appointed ambassador at Vienna, and in that capacity counteracted the plans of the Swedish chancellor, Count Arvid Horn, for joining the anti-Russian Hanoverian Alliance.

During the riksdags of 1726–27 and 1731, Tessin fiercely opposed the government, and his wit, eloquence, and imposing presence made him one of the foremost protagonists of the party subsequently known as "The Hats". From 1735 to 1736 he was again Swedish ambassador at Vienna. In 1735, he was iniated into the St. Jean Auxilliare Freemason Lodge by his brother-in-law Axel Wrede Sparre. During the riksdag of 1738 he was elected marshal of the Riksdag of the Estates and contributed more than anyone else to the overthrow of the Horn administration the same year.

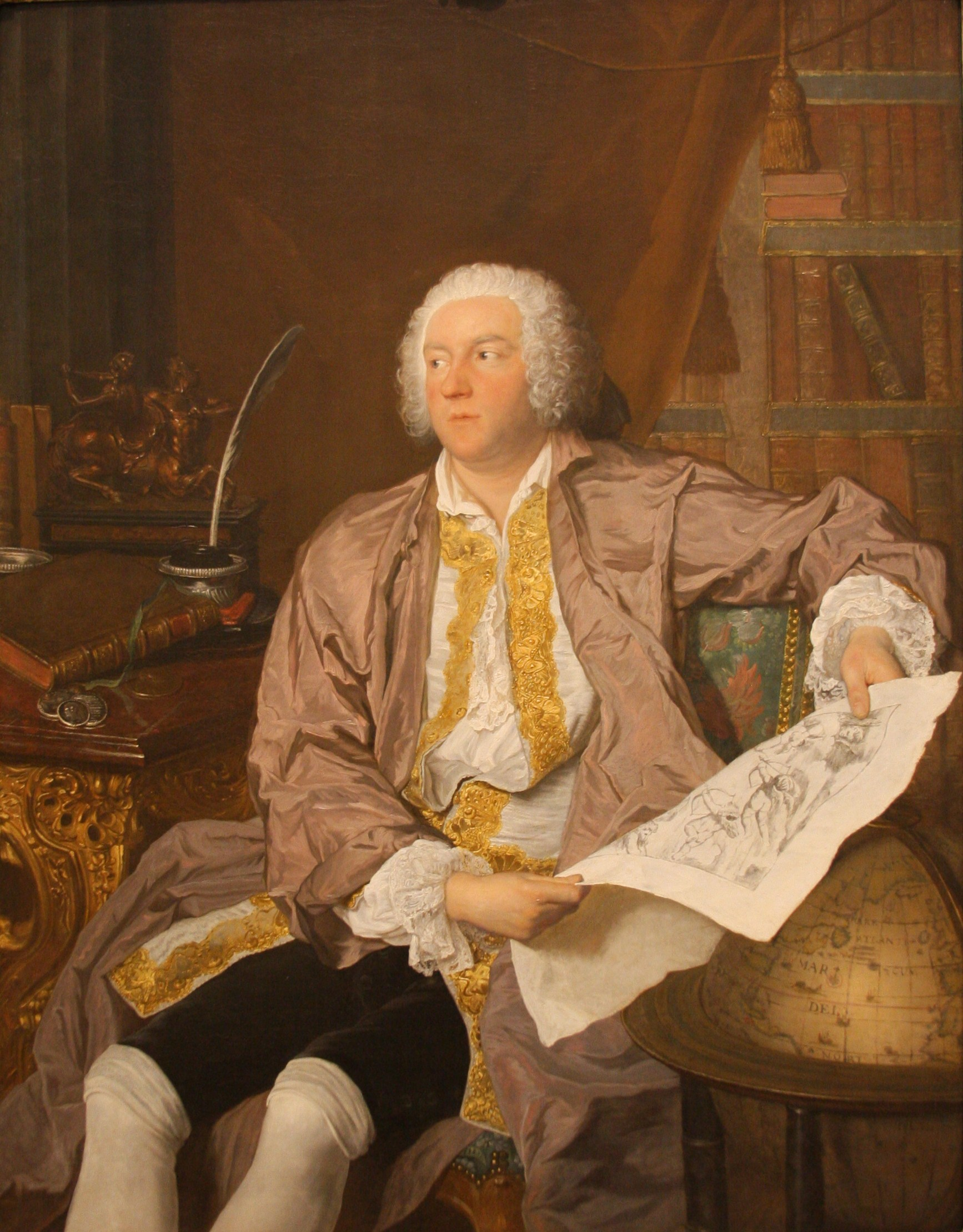
Painting of Count Tessin by the French painter Jacques-Andé Aved.

On the division of the spoil of patronage he chose for himself the post of ambassador extraordinary at Paris, and from 1739 to 1742 delighted Versailles with his brilliant qualities of grand seigneur, at the same time renewing the traditional alliance between France and Sweden which had been interrupted for more than sixty years. His political ability, however, was by no means commensurate with his splendid social qualities. It was his sanguine credulity which committed the Hats to their rash and unconsidered war with Russia in 1741–43, though in fairness it must be added that Tessin helped them out of their difficulties again by his adroitness as party leader and his stirring eloquence. He gained his seat in the senate as a reward for his services on this occasion. In 1743 Tessin attempted to reconcile the long outstanding differences between Sweden and Denmark in a special mission to Copenhagen.

In 1744 he was sent at the head of an extraordinary embassade to Berlin to escort to Stockholm Frederick the Great's sister, Louisa Ulrika, the chosen bride of the Swedish crown prince, Adolphus Frederick. As a member of the young court, Tessin speedily captivated the royal pair. He also succeeded in extricating the crown prince from the influence of the Russian Empress Elizabeth of Russia, to whom Adolphus Frederick owed his throne when he became king of Sweden in 1751, thereby essentially contributing to the maintenance of the independence of Sweden.

He was elected a member of the Royal Swedish Academy of Sciences in 1741. From 1746 to 1752 Tessin was president of the chancellery, as the Swedish prime minister was called in those days. His system aimed at a rapprochement with Denmark with the view of counterbalancing the influence of Russia in the north. It was a dignified and prudent policy, but his endeavour to consolidate it by promoting a matrimonial alliance between the two courts alienated the Swedish crown prince, who, as a Holsteiner, nourished an ineradicable hatred of everything Danish. As, moreover, on the accession of Adolphus Frederick in 1751, Tessin refused to countenance any extension of the royal prerogative, the rupture between him and the court became final. On the occasion of the coronation (1752) he resigned the premiership, and in 1754 the governorship of the young crown prince Gustavus also, spending the rest of his days at his estate at Åkerö Manor, where he died.

He was given the L’Ordre de l’Harmonie.

== Art collection ==
Carl Gustaf Tessin was also an art collector. During his mission in Paris he bought many paintings and drawings, including 2000 drawings from the famous 1741 auction of the former Pierre Crozat collection. Being heavily in debt on his return to Sweden, he was obliged to sell part of his collection to the then King Fredrik I, who gave them to Queen Louisa Ulrika. Part of his art collection is now in the Swedish Nationalmuseum.

The collection was on display in New York at the Morgan Library & Museum, "Treasures from the Nationalmuseum of Sweden: The Collections of Count Tessin."

== Principal works by Tessin ==
- Tessin och Tessiniana (1st ed. Stockholm, 1819), autobiographical extracts from Tessin's voluminous manuscript Memoirs in 29 volumes.
- K. G. Tessins Dagbok (Stockholm, 1824), further extracts from the same.
- En gammal mans bref til en ung Prins (Stockholm, 1753; English editions, 1755 and 1756), addressed to his pupil, afterwards Gustavus III.
