= Fredrika Åkerö =

Finnish politician

Fredrika Åkerö (born 15 March 1984) is a Finnish politician of the Swedish People's Party of Finland (SPP). She is also a businesswoman and investor.

== Biography ==
Åkerö is a former chair of Swedish Youth, SPP's youth organization. She was elected chair in May 2010 and continued in the role until the April 2012 congress, at which point she did not run for re-election. Prior to her election as chair of Swedish Youth, she had served as the organization's vice chair since 2009. From 2012 to 2013, Åkerö served as president of the Nordiska Centerungdomens Förbund, the Nordic Centre Youth.

Åkerö served as a member of the Karjaa city council and city board from 2005 to 2008, and since 2009, after Karjaa merged with Pohja and Tammisaari, as a member of the Raasepori city council. In 2013, she was elected as the second vice chair of the Raasepori city board and as chair of the city's corporation division. During the 2009–2012 term, she was the chair of the Raasepori education board. Åkerö also worked as a parliamentary assistant to the Minister of Migration and European Affairs Astrid Thors from 2007 to 2009.

Åkerö studied public administration at Åbo Akademi, graduating in 2010 with a Bachelor of Political Science. She has worked, among other roles, as a youth secretary for the city of Raasepori.

Åkerö has played handball since she was nine years old and has also played at the highest level. Her teams have included BK-46, Åbo IFK (2004–2005), and HIFK/Planets.
