= Louis-Joseph Le Lorrain =

French painter (1715–1760)

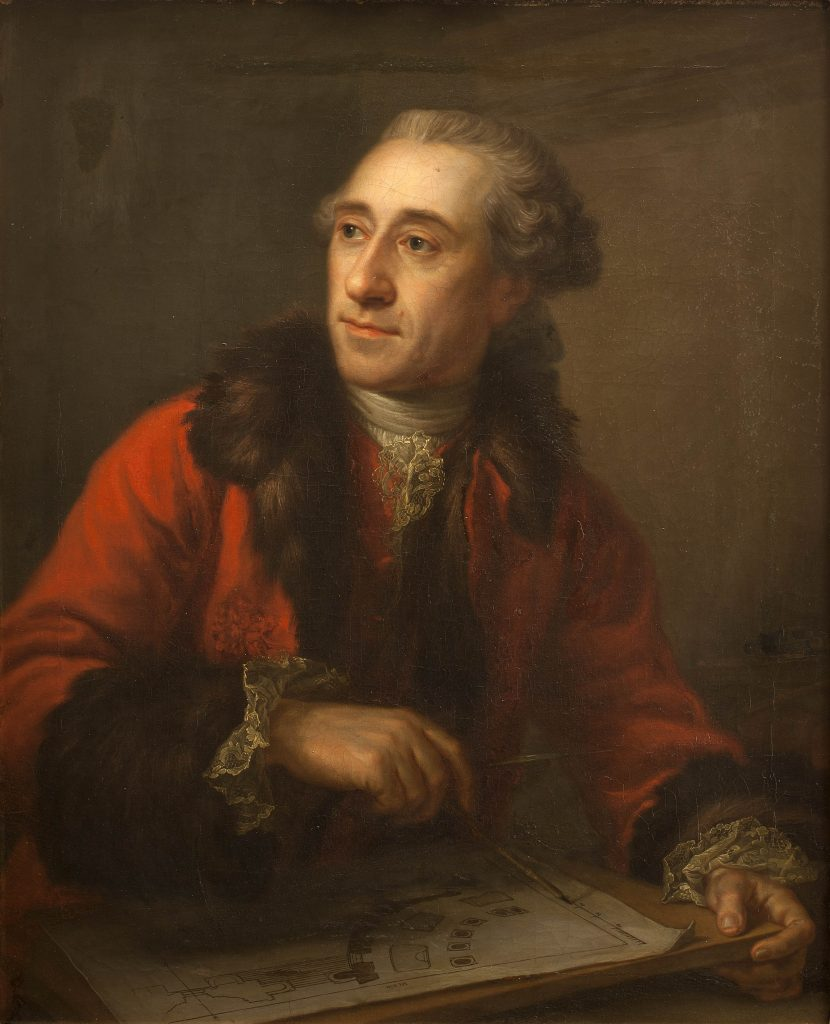
Portrait of Louis-Joseph Le Lorrain by Peder Als, 1764, Royal Danish Academy of Fine Arts.

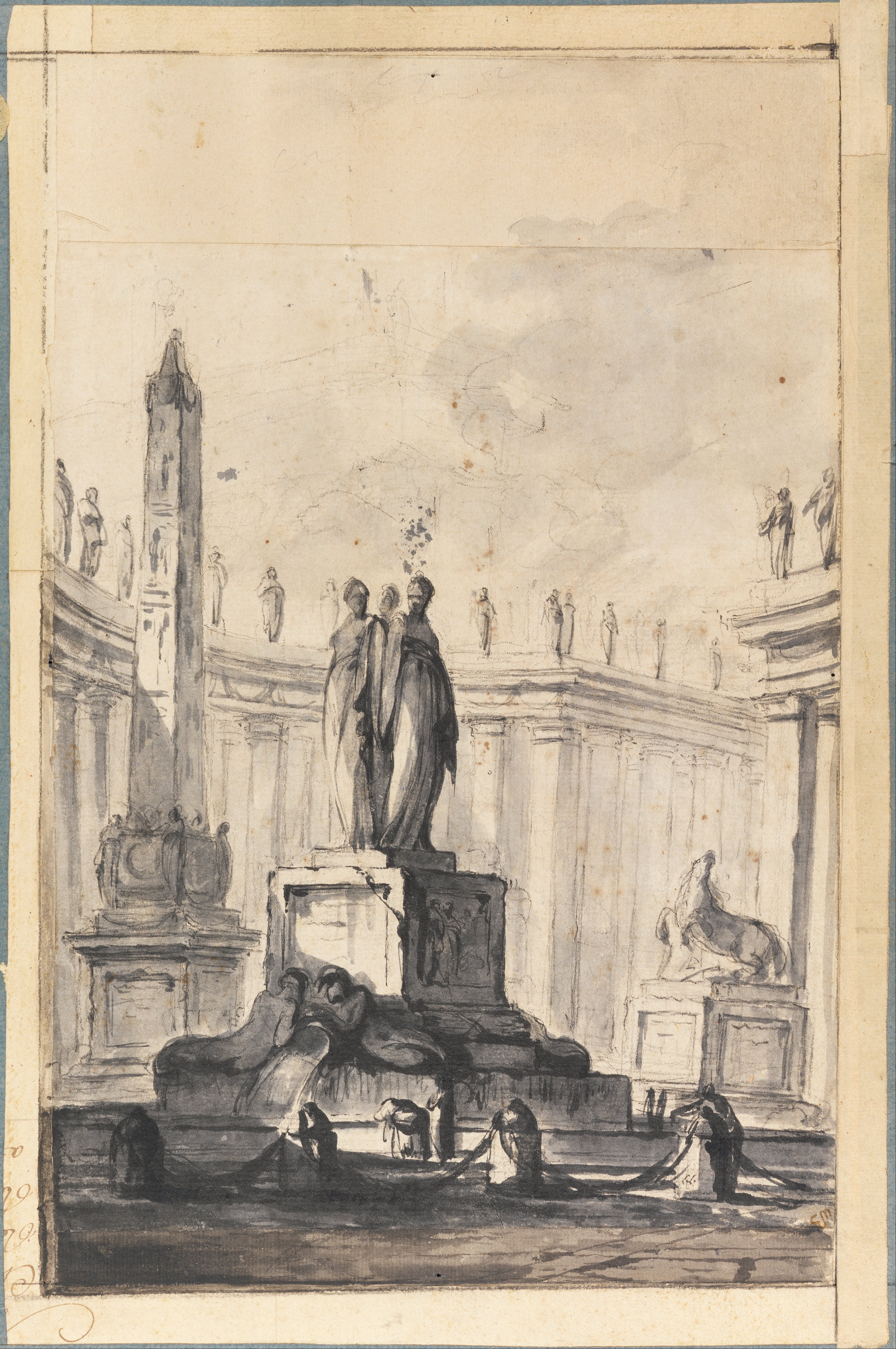
"Architectural Fantasy with Fountain and Obelisk" by Louis-Joseph Le Lorrain, c.a. 1745

Louis-Joseph Le Lorrain (1715, Paris – 1760) was a French painter and engraver.

He studied design and engraving with Jacques Dumont. He then moved to Rome, becoming known in artistic circles before returning to Paris to join the Academy. He spent some years in St Petersburg, Russia, where he died. He painted devotional canvases with vigorous touch. He engraved with acquaforte some of his own compositions. He also engraved the following paintings by Jean-Francois de Troy: the Judgement of Solomon, Solomon sacrifices to the idols of his concubine, Esther and Assuerus, and Death of Cleopatra. Among his disciples was Fyodor Rokotov.

His son, Jean-Baptiste Le Lorrain, was an engraver. He was born in Paris in 1737. Apprenticed to his father, his prints include: Chauville in tragedy of Calas by De Lorme; Venus at Judgement of Paris, by Boucher; the Tranquil Wave by Vernet; Homage to Love by Van Loo; and seven scenes of the Life of St Gregory .
