= Börstorp =

Building in Mariestad Municipality, Västra Götaland County, Sweden

Coordinates: 58°47′59″N 13°57′46″E

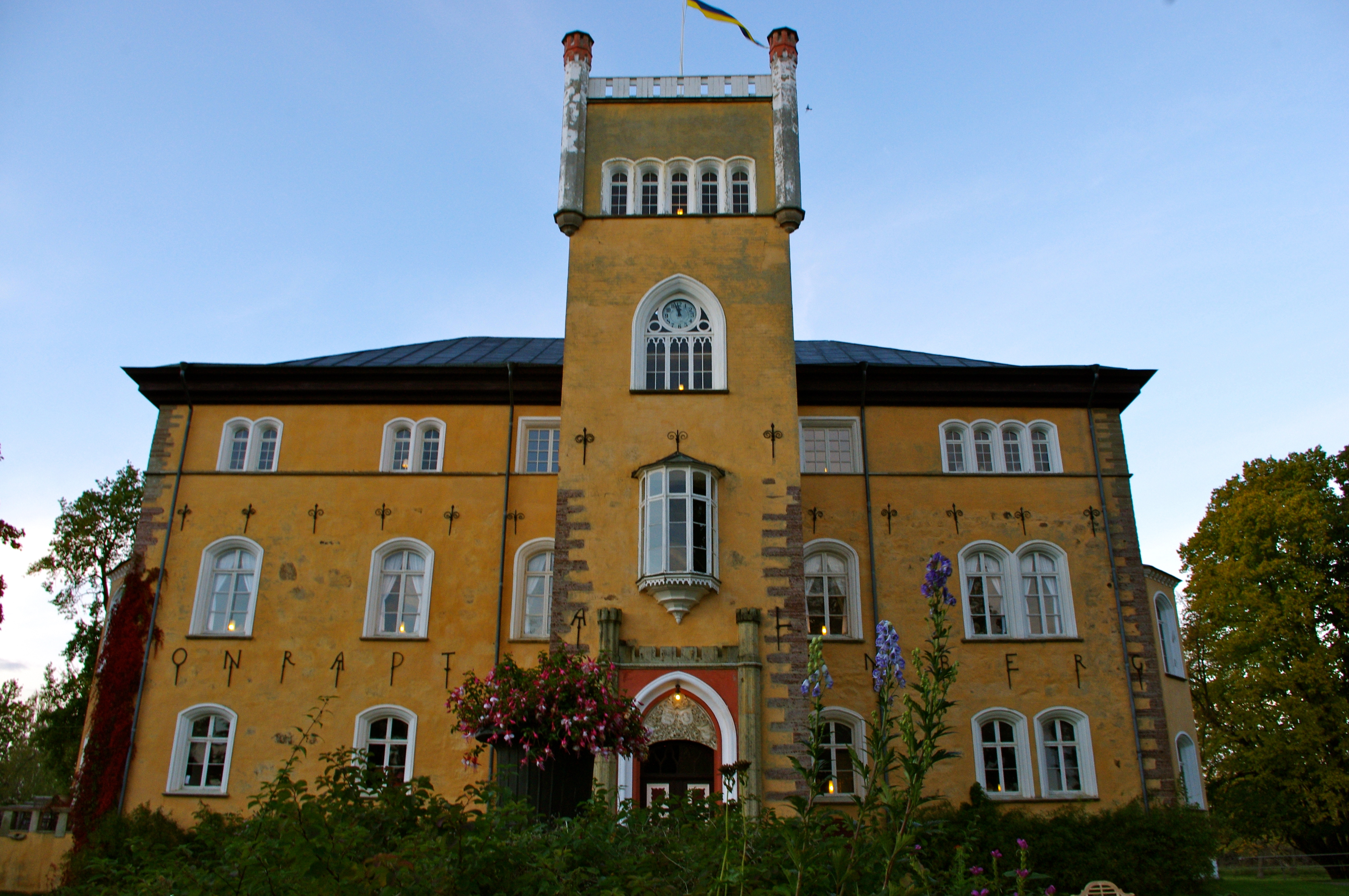
Börstorp

Börstorp is a manor house located at Börstorpsviken, a gulf of Sweden's largest lake Vänern.

The estate is known to have existed since the 14th century. Börstorp became a manor in 1625. The main stone building was built by Conrad Falkenberg and completed in 1646. It was later rebuilt in neo-Gothic inspiration in the 1850s by Carl Leuhusen according to the drawings of architect Hjalmar Wijnblad.
