= Åkerö Manor =

1750s manor house in Södermanland, Sweden

- Sweden
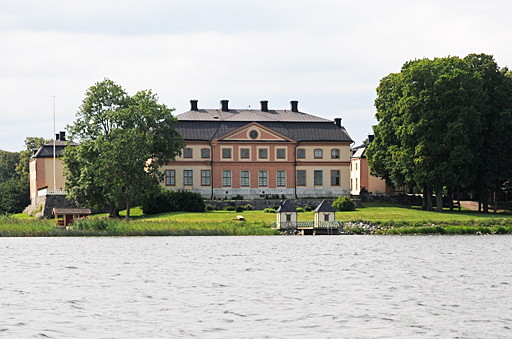
- Åkerö Manor, view from Lake Yngaren

Site information
- Type: Castle

Location
- Location in Södermanland, Sweden
- Location within Södermanland
- Coordinates: 58.8930556°N 016.5711111°E

Site history
- Built: 1752-57 (present building)
- Built by: Carl Gustaf Tessin

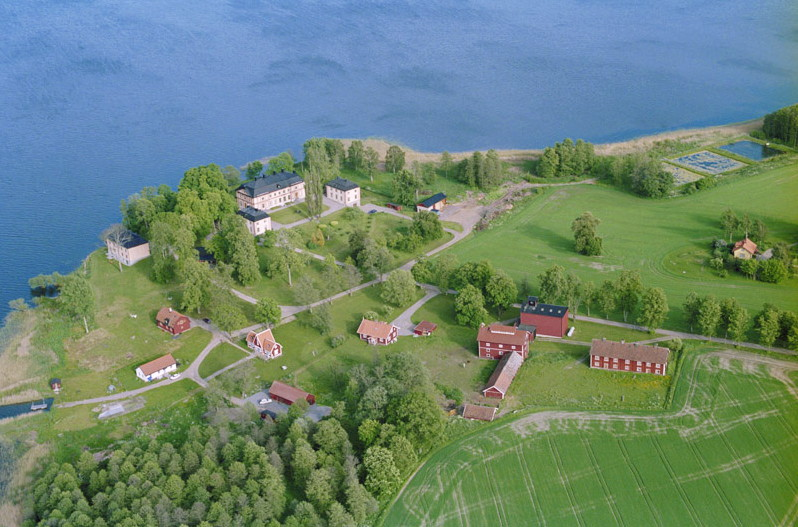
Aerial view of Åkerö

Åkerö Manor (Åkerö slott) is a manor house in Södermanland, Sweden. Although an estate with a history going back to the Middle Ages, the presently visible manor house complex was commissioned in 1748 (completed in 1752-1757) by Carl Gustaf Tessin (1695-1770) and designed by Carl Hårleman. It is a fine example of Rococo manor house architecture in Sweden.

== History ==
The estate is one of the oldest in Södermanland, dating from the 13th century. It was first mentioned in 1281. During the 16th century, the owners at the time, the Bielke family, erected a renaissance manor house. During that time, from 1540 to 1590, it belonged to Anna Bielke. In 1660, about a hundred years later, the building was damaged by fire and never completely restored.

In 1748 Carl Gustaf Tessin bought the estate. He ordered the old, damaged buildings to be demolished and commissioned a new building to be built to the designs by Carl Hårleman (it was built in 1752-1757). Louis-Joseph Le Lorrain was commissioned to design the interiors.

== See also ==
- List of castles in Sweden
