= Mariedal Castle =

Coordinates: 58°28′24″N 13°24′10″E

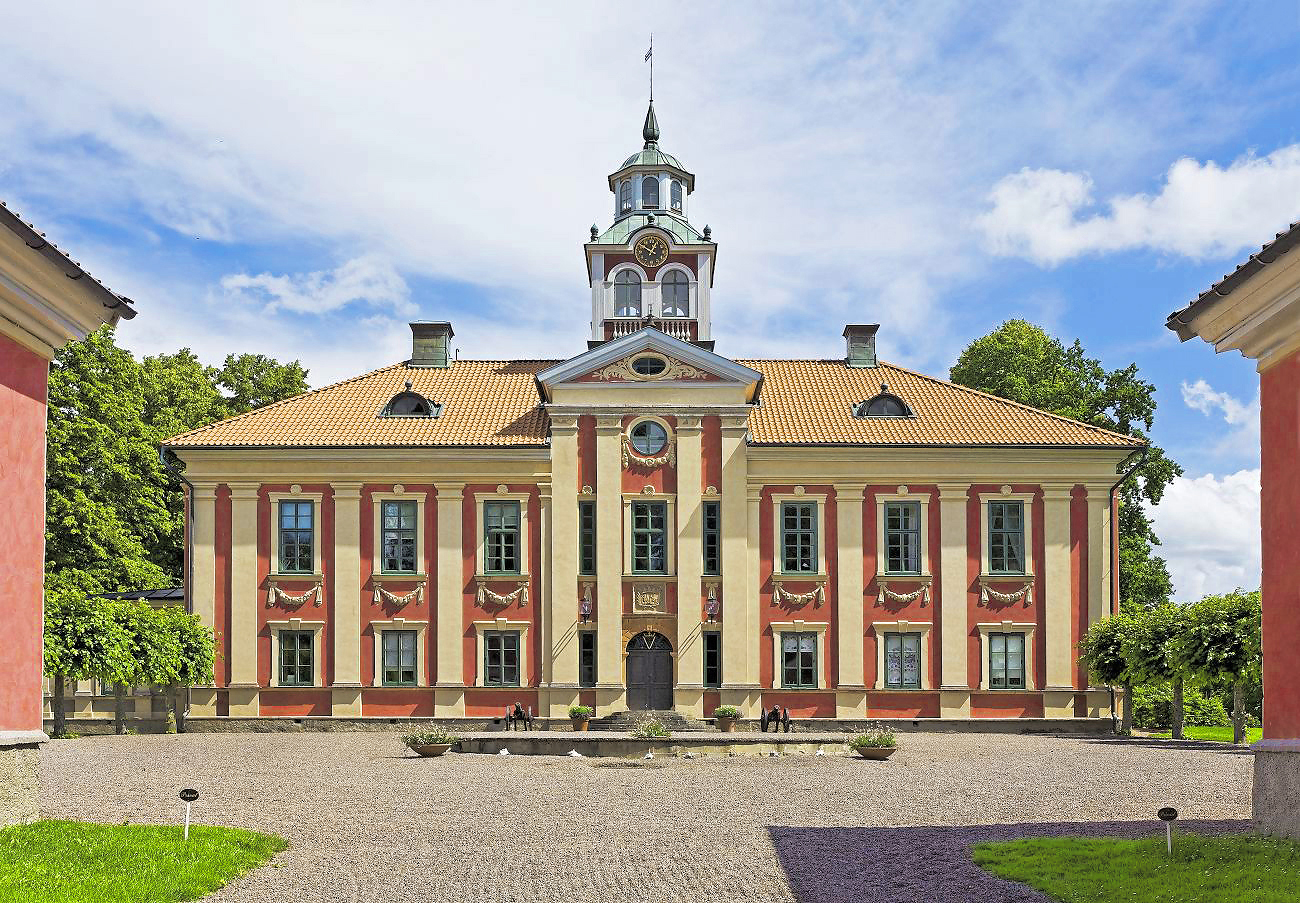
- Interactive map of the Mariedal Castle area

General information
- Type: Manor house
- Location: Götene Municipality, Sweden

Mariedal Castle (Swedish: Mariedals slott) is a manor house in Götene Municipality, Västergötland, Sweden.

== History ==
In the middle of the 17th century Magnus Gabriel De la Gardie (1622–1686) acquired the estate. On these grounds the main building with two wings was erected. The estate was named after Magnus Gabriel's wife Maria Euphrosyne, the sister of King Charles X of Sweden.

Written accounts and the weather vane indicate the main building was built in 1666. The building consists of a stone house on two floors in Baroque style. The interior of the castle provides stucco ceiling and wainscoting. It has been commonly assumed that Jean de la Vallée was responsible for the design. There are many obvious similarities between Mariedal and other structures designed by De la Valle, in particular the Riddarhuset in Stockholm, however, there is yet no proof of any connection between the buildings.

From 1740 to 1786, it was the home of Countess Eva Ekeblad (1724– 1786), the daughter of Count Magnus Julius De la Gardie (1668–1741). Upon her marriage, her father gifted Mariedal to her and her husband Claes Claesson Ekeblad.

== See also ==
- List of castles in Sweden
