= De la Gardie family =

Swedish noble family

De la Gardie
- Swedish noble family
- Country: Sweden
- Founded: c. late 1500s
- Current head: Carl Gustaf De la Gardie

The De la Gardie family (Swedish pronunciation: [ˌd̠eː² la ˈɡaːɖiːɛ²]; French: [d(ə) la ɡa̠ʁ̞ˈdi]; also de la Gardie) is the name of a distinguished Swedish noble family of French origin, whose members held significant political and military positions throughout the history of the Kingdom of Sweden.

== History ==
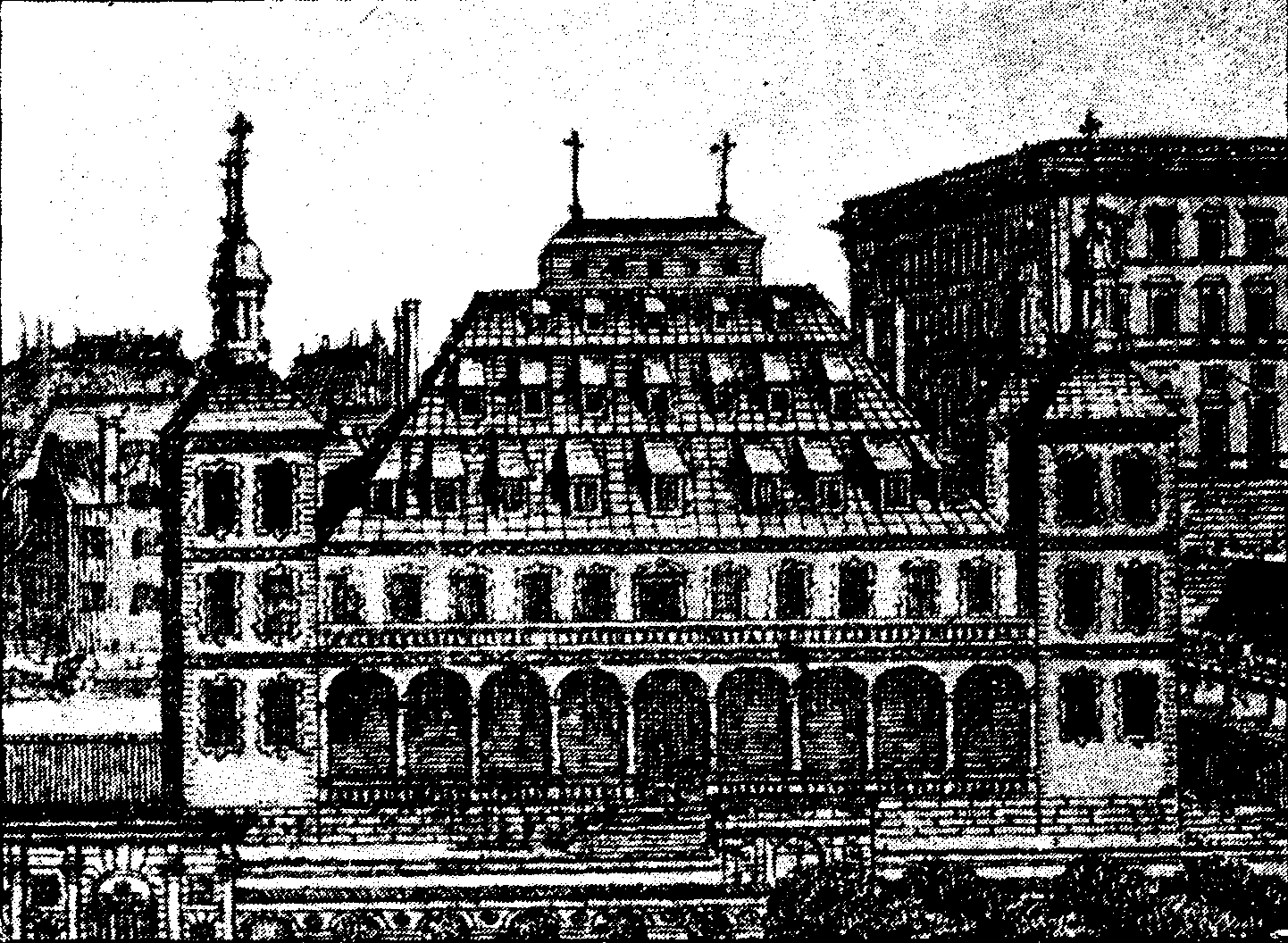
The Palace Makalös (Peerless) of the De la Gardie family, with the Royal Castle in Stockholm in the background.

The family's social status in France is uncertain; the founder, Ponce d'Escouperie, son of a tradesman, came to Sweden as a mercenary in 1565 and took the name Pontus De la Gardie when registered by the House of Knights. He was given the title friherre in 1571 and married Sofia Johansdotter Gyllenhielm, an illegitimate daughter of king John III in 1580.

The baronial title ended with his eldest son John De la Gardie. Pontus De la Gardie's second son, Jacob De la Gardie, was given the title count of Läckö in 1615; his grandson Magnus Gabriel De la Gardie became a favourite of Queen Christina and married her cousin, Countess Palatine Maria Eufrosyne of Zweibrücken (a sister of Charles X Gustav of Sweden).

The De la Gardie of Läckö comital lineage is extinct. The current head of the family, Carl Gustaf De la Gardie (1946– ), lives outside Linköping.

== Notable members ==
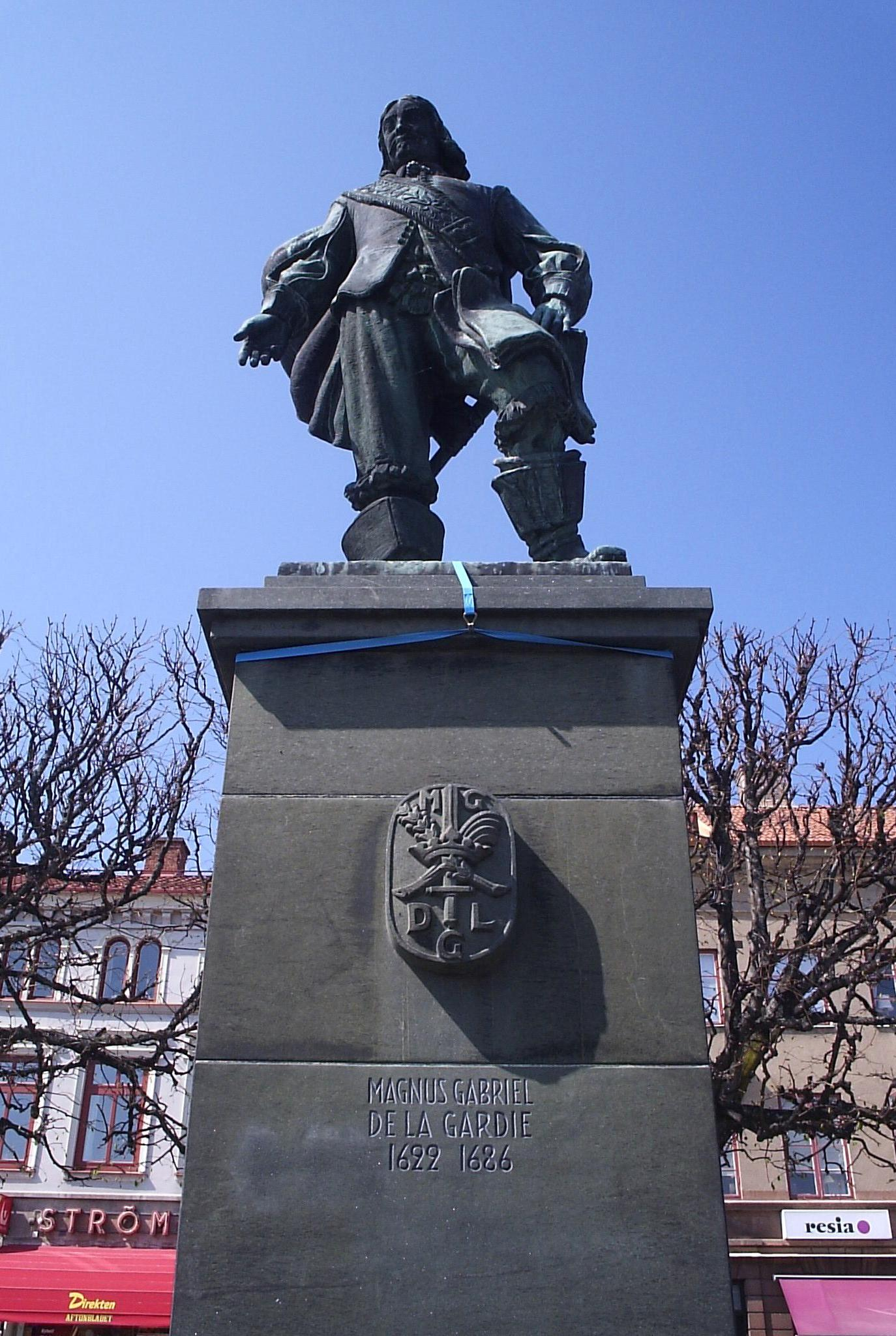
Statue of Magnus Gabriel De la Gardie in Lidköping

- Pontus De la Gardie (1520–1585), Governor of Swedish Estonia (1574–1575, 1583–1585), married Sofia Johansdotter Gyllenhielm, illegitimate daughter of John III of Sweden
- Jacob De la Gardie (1583–1652), Swedish statesman and soldier, son of Pontus; led the Swedish army to Moscow
- Johan De la Gardie (1582–1640), Swedish statesman, son of Pontus
- Magnus Gabriel De la Gardie (1622–1686), Swedish statesman, son of Jacob
- Maria Sofia De la Gardie (1627–1694), industrialist, daughter of Jacob
- Axel Julius De la Gardie (1637–1710), Swedish field marshal, son of Jacob
- Johanna Eleonora De la Gardie (1661–1708), lady-in-waiting and poet
- Magnus Julius De la Gardie (1668–1741), Swedish general and statesman, son of Axel
- Brita Sophia De la Gardie (1713–1797), amateur actress and cultural personality
- Catherine Charlotte De la Gardie (1723–1763), heroine
- Eva Ekeblad née Eva De la Gardie (1724–1786), scientist
- Hedvig Catharina De la Gardie (1732–1800), daughter of Magnus Julius, wife of Axel von Fersen the Elder and mother of Axel von Fersen the Younger
- Hedvig Ulrika De la Gardie (1761–1832), lady-in-waiting

== See also ==
- De la Gardie Campaign
- House of Bernadotte, ruling dynasty of the Swedish monarchy, also of French roots
