= Magnus Gabriel De la Gardie =

Swedish statesman (1622–1686)

Count Magnus Gabriel De la Gardie
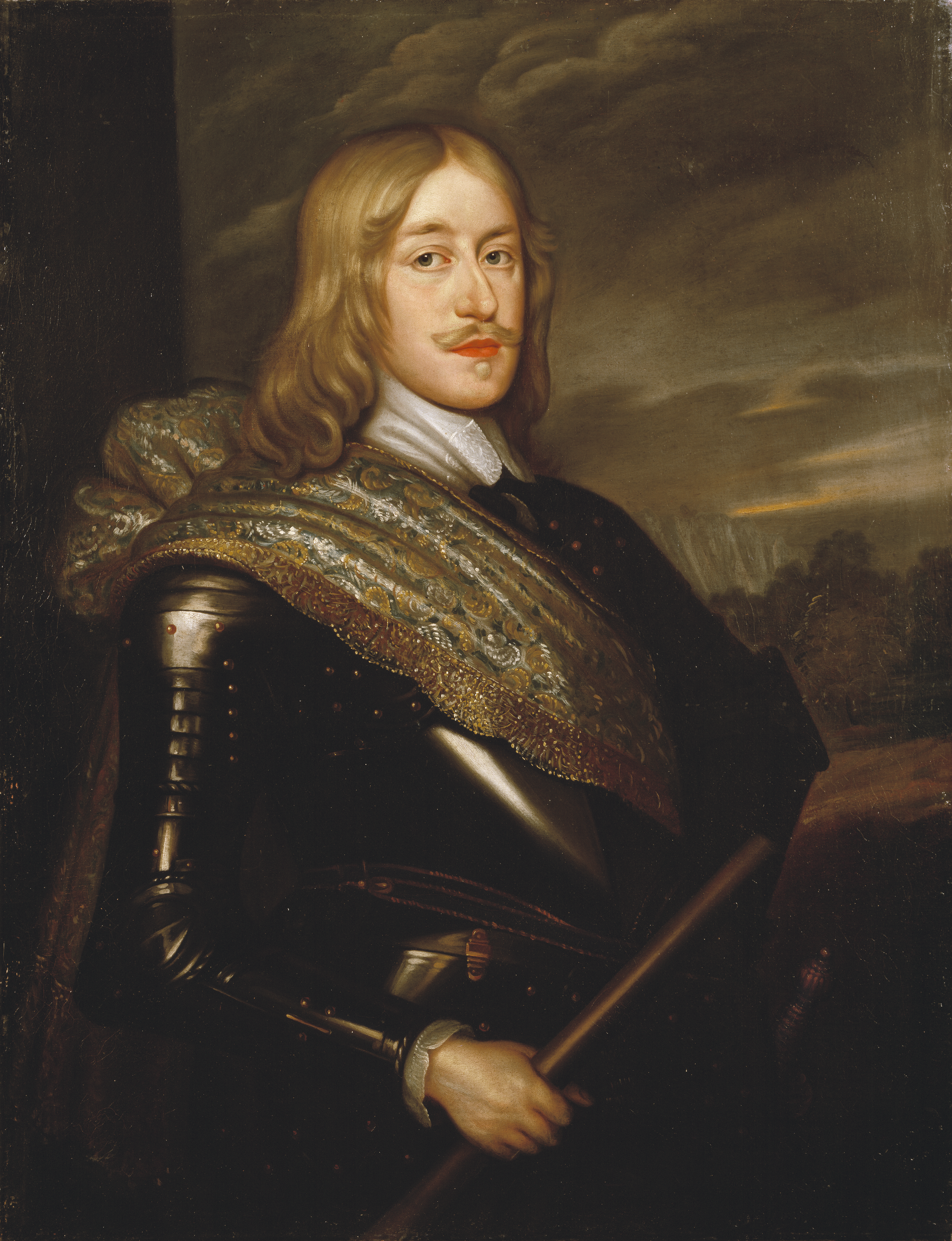
- Portrait by Hendrik Munnichhoven

Lord High Treasurer of Sweden
- In office 1652–1660
- Preceded by: Gabriel Bengtsson Oxenstierna
- Succeeded by: Gustaf Bonde

Lord High Chancellor of Sweden
- In office 1660–1680
- Preceded by: Erik Oxenstierna
- Succeeded by: None – office abolished (until 1792)

Lord High Steward of Sweden
- In office 1680–1684
- Preceded by: Per Brahe the Younger
- Succeeded by: None – office abolished (until 1787)

Governor-General of Livonia
- In office 1649–1651
- Preceded by: Gabriel Bengtsson Oxenstierna
- Succeeded by: Gustav Horn
- In office 1655–1657
- Preceded by: Gustav Horn
- Succeeded by: Axel Lillie (in 1661)

Personal details
- Born: 15 October 1622 Reval, Swedish Estonia
- Died: 26 April 1686 (aged 63) Venngarn Castle, Sigtuna, Sweden
- Spouse: Maria Euphrosyne of Zweibrücken
- Children: Gustaf Adolf De la Gardie; Catharina Charlotta De la Gardie; Hedvig Ebba De la Gardie

Count Magnus Gabriel De la Gardie (15 October 1622 – 26 April 1686) was a Swedish statesman and military man. He became a member of the Swedish Privy Council in 1647 and came to be the holder of three of the five offices counted as the Great Officers of the Realm, namely Lord High Treasurer, Lord High Chancellor and Lord High Steward. He also served as Governor-General in the Swedish dominion of Livonia.

== Birth and ancestry ==
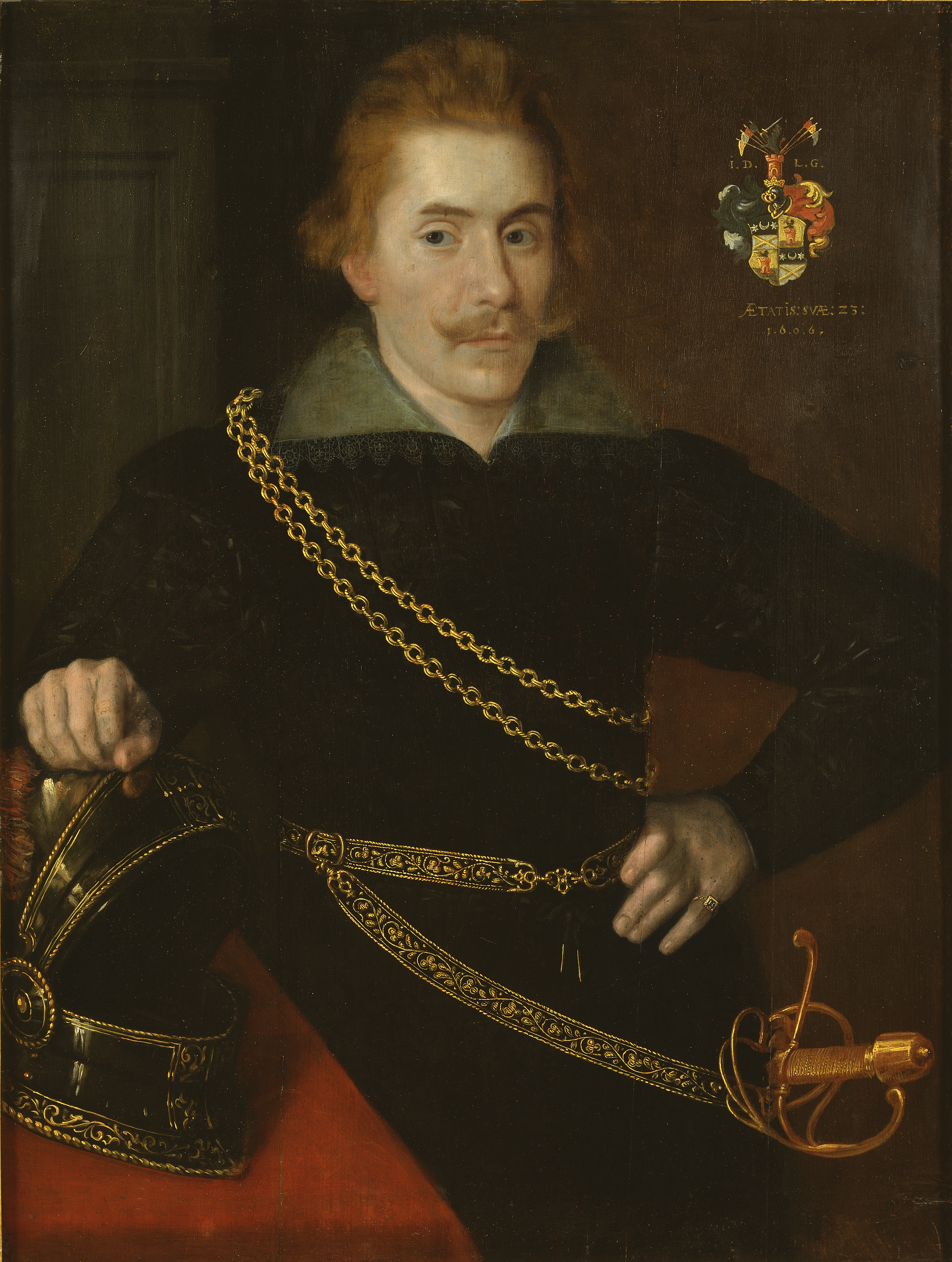
Jacob De la Gardie

Magnus Gabriel De la Gardie was born on 15 October 1622. The place of his birth was Reval (present-day Tallinn), Estonia, which at the time was a Swedish dominion where Magnus Gabriel's father Jacob De la Gardie served as governor. Jacob De la Gardie, Count of Läckö, was a prominent military commander who served as Lord High Constable of Sweden from 1620 until his death in 1652. Father of Jacob, and grandfather of Magnus Gabriel, was Baron Pontus De la Gardie, a French mercenary who had been in Danish service but made a career in Sweden after having been captured by Swedish troops in 1565. Pontus married Sofia Gyllenhielm, the daughter of King John III, in 1580.

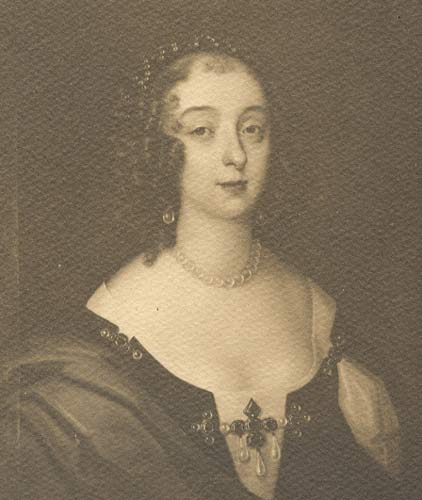
Ebba Brahe

Magnus Gabriel's mother was Ebba Brahe, daughter of Lord High Steward Magnus Brahe and Brita Leijonhufvud. Ebba had a relationship with young King Gustavus Adolphus, probably during the years 1613–1615. Gustavus's mother, Christina of Holstein-Gottorp, ruined her son's wish to marry Ebba Brahe, who in 1618 instead married Jacob De la Gardie. Ebba and Jacob had 14 children, of whom seven lived to maturity. These seven were Magnus Gabriel, Maria Sofia, Jacob Casimir, Pontus Frederick, Christina Catharina, Axel Julius and Ebba Margaretha.

== Career ==
Being a member of a wealthy family of the highest esteem, De la Gardie was predestined for an eminent career. He received a thorough education from his teacher Mattias Björnklou, and was in 1639 elected rector illustris at Uppsala University, thanks to his ancestry; this position put a student on a board that oversaw the university, in the hopes that he could influence the government on economic matters favor of university through his relatives and other high level contacts. The next year, he travelled abroad to complete his training. Much of this period was spent in France and the Netherlands. When the Torstenson War between Sweden and Denmark broke out in 1643, De la Gardie returned to his native Sweden, and learned about warfare under the command of Field Marshal Gustav Horn.

=== 1644–1654: Under Queen Christina ===
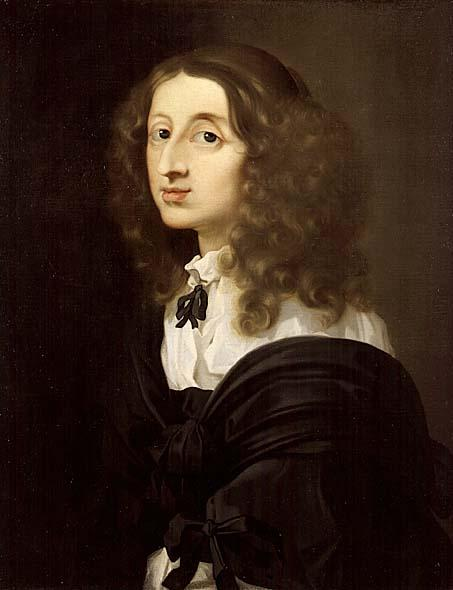
Queen Christina

Early on during the reign of Queen Christina (1644–1654) De la Gardie became the queen's favorite at only 23 years of age. His knowledge concerning culture, politics and representation impressed the queen just as his talent for organizing festivities.

In 1645 he was promoted to colonel of the Life Guards. In 1646, De la Gardie was head of a diplomatic mission to France in order to find Queen Christina musicians for her Swedish court. The mission was a success for De la Gardie, who upon his return to Sweden received distinctions of an unparalleled amount. Furthermore, the queen arranged a wedding for him and the queen's cousin Maria Eufrosyne of Zweibrücken at the Royal Palace. After the wedding, De la Gardie was made a Privy Councillor. On 17 April 1648, he was promoted to general and served as such under the future king, and his own brother-in-law, Charles Gustav, during the Siege of Prague that took place in the final months of the Thirty Years' War. Despite making only a slight contribution in the war, De la Gardie was eventually rewarded 22,500 riksdaler, more than any other general. The same year, he was created count of Arensburg (Kuressaare). De la Gardie began his first of two terms as Governor-General of the Swedish dominion of Livonia in 1649.

Prior to Queen Christina's coronation, De la Gardie gave Queen Christina a solid sterling silver throne, to be used for the event. At the coronation in 1650, De la Gardie was entrusted with carrying the royal banner. A year later, in 1651, he ended his first term in Livonia and was appointed Marshal of the Realm (riksmarskalk). In 1652, he became Lord High Treasurer (riksskattmästare), which was one of five Great Officers of the Realm and, as such, one of the most prominent and powerful members of the Privy Council as well as head of the Kammarkollegiet. Also in 1652, De la Gardie was appointed lawspeaker (lagman) of Västergötland and Dalsland. When his father Jacob died that year, Magnus Gabriel inherited Läckö Castle and became Count of Läckö.

=== Falling out of favor ===
In 1653, De la Gardie fell out of favor with the queen. He and his family had to leave the court and for the rest of Christina's reign, De la Gardie lived on his manors in some kind of an exile. However, Queen Christina abdicated soon thereafter and was replaced on the throne by Charles Gustav, the brother of De la Gardie's wife Maria Eufrosyne.

=== 1654–1660: Under Charles X Gustav ===
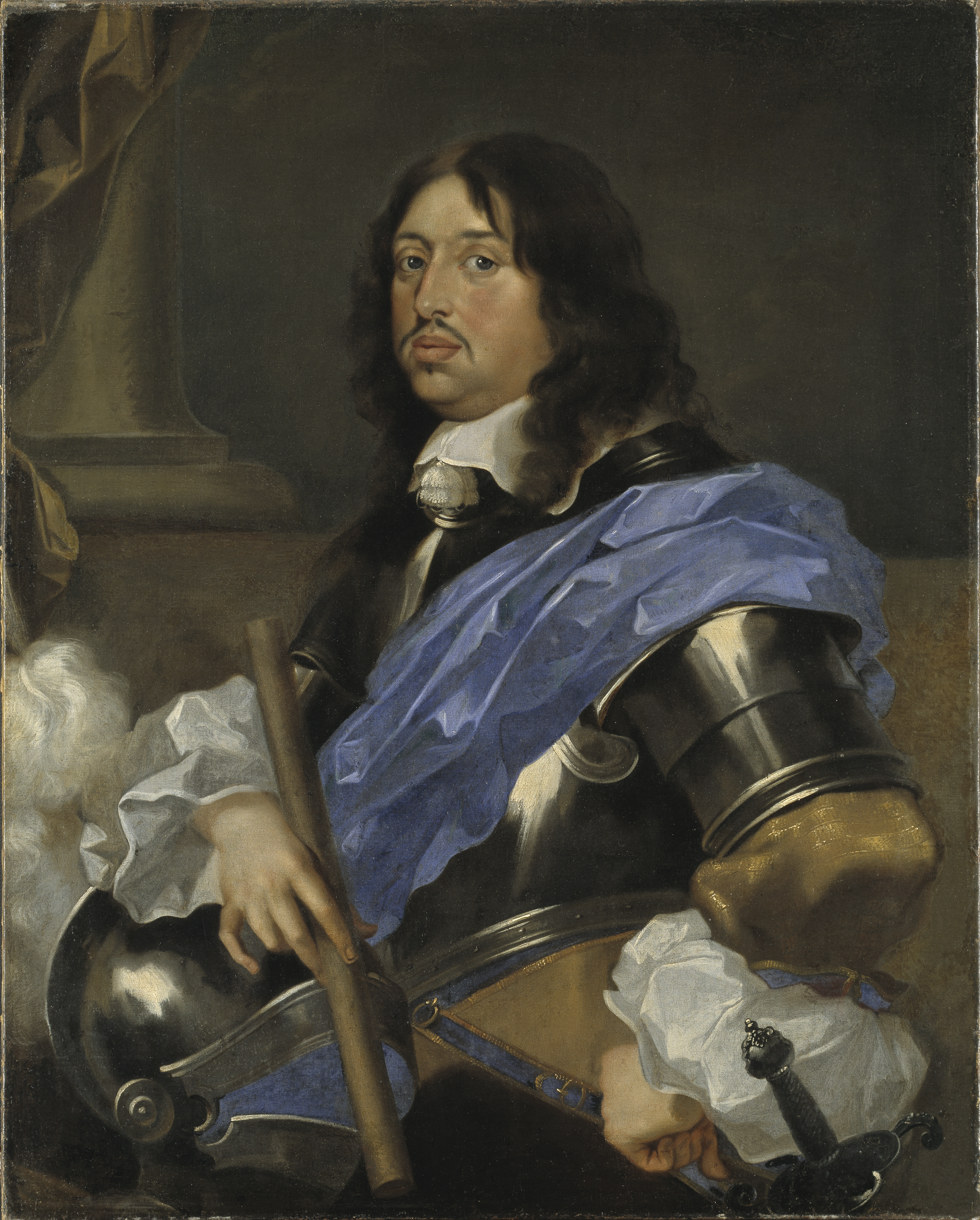
King Charles X Gustav

When Charles Gustav, De la Gardie's brother-in-law, ascended to the throne, it meant a return to the public for De la Gardie. In August 1654, he became governor of Västergötland, Dalsland and Halland and in December that year he was made chancellor of Uppsala University. In 1655, he was for the second time chosen for the office of General-Governor of Livonia. He also became Lieutenant General of the Swedish troops in Ingria, Estonia and Livonia, which meant that he commanded troops in the wars against the Polish-Lithuanian Commonwealth and Russia. It appears that De la Gardie was anything but a splendid military commander, as he received much more complaints than praise from the king for his actions in that area. During negotiations with Poland, De la Gardie was the prime Swedish representative. He took part in the deliberations leading to the Swedish-Polish Treaty of Oliva in 1660.

King Charles X Gustav died in early 1660. In accordance to his will, De la Gardie was appointed Lord High Chancellor and, as such, member of the regency that ruled Sweden during the minority of Charles XI (1660–1672).

=== 1660–1672: In the regency ===
De la Gardie was the most renowned and influential among the regency members, although he was often challenged. This may have been due to the fact that he was, reportedly, unable to work enough, and that he often left the court to spend significant time on his different estates, a disadvantage for both the government and De la Gardie's own position of power.

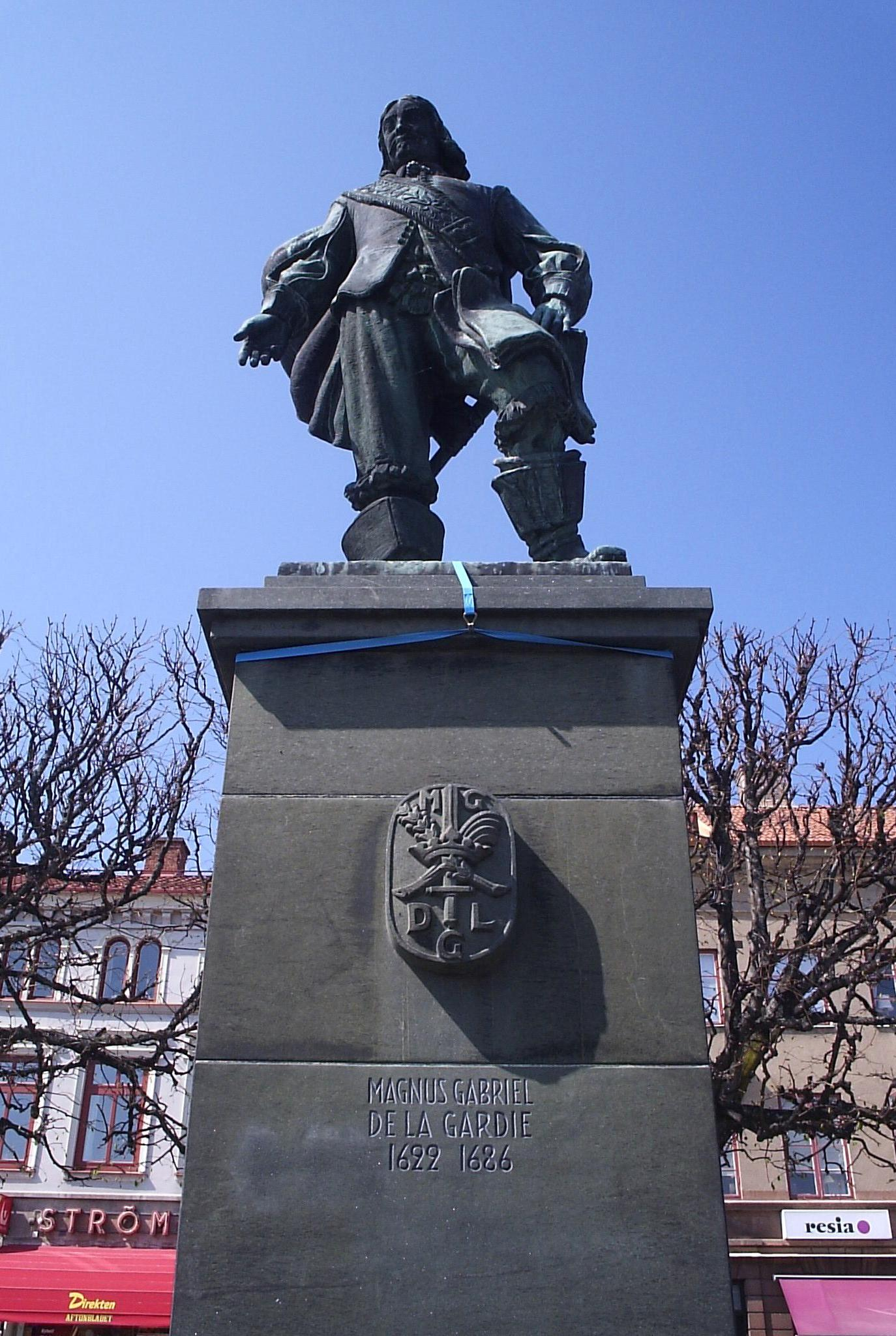
Statue of Magnus Gabriel De la Gardie in Lidköping

Being experienced and having many important relationships, he was a prominent member of a regency but he looked too much to the past and the traditions during the Thirty Years' War and therefore lacked a vision suitable to the demands of a new era. The regency was divided into parties. De la Gardie was the main representative of the party in favour of warlike adventures and a close relationship to France. The opponents, represented by Lord High Treasurer Gustaf Bonde, Lord High Steward Per Brahe the Younger and Johan Gyllenstierna, were advocates of a more peaceful and economical way. The opinions of De la Gardie's side most often won out and, therefore, Sweden was nearly drawn into wars against Russia and Poland during the regency period.

Early on in the period, in 1661, Sweden and France had signed a treaty which included a secret paragraph committing Sweden to support the French candidate on the first vacancy of the Polish throne, in exchange for a large sum of money. In April 1672, the two allies signed a new treaty in Stockholm. According to this treaty, Sweden would keep an army of 16,000 men in its German dominions to make sure the German states would not interfere in a war between France and its enemies the Netherlands and Spain. In return, Sweden would receive 400,000 riksdaler annually in peacetime. In wartime, the amount would be increased to 600,000 riksdaler. In a Sweden with great financial problems, these subsidies was, in Count De la Gardie's thinking, a more attractive way to improve the state's finances than a reduction, which would mean that lands granted the nobility would be reclaimed by the Crown.

De la Gardie himself was responsible for parts of the financial troubles Sweden faced at the time, created by Johan Palmstruch and his paper money. He made several donations from the Crown to himself and used national resources for private matters. Meanwhile, since they did not receive the funds necessary for maintenance, the navy went into decline, and soldiers died or ran away from the army since they did not receive their pay.

=== 1672–1686: Under Charles XI ===
In December 1672, King Charles XI came to age. Despite what people might have anticipated, De la Gardie now became mightier than ever before. The young and inexperienced king seems to have been glad to take the advice of his Lord High Chancellor De la Gardie, who tried to increase the king's power in order to increase his own. However, from 1675, his influence decreased. That year, bound by the treaty with France, Sweden entered the Franco-Dutch War by invading Brandenburg. Although being numerically superior, the Swedish forces lost at Fehrbellin, which led to Denmark being encouraged to attack Sweden. Thus, the Scanian War was initiated. In connection with King Charles's coronation the same year, De la Gardie was accused of high treason, an accusation that soon was judged as unjustified.

During the Scanian War, De la Gardie commanded troops that fought against the Norwegian army in Bohuslän. With this war operation, like earlier operations, De la Gardie lacked success, and suffered a considerable setback at Uddevalla in 1677.

=== Reduction and absolutism: The fall of De la Gardie ===
The harsh conditions in the latter half of the 1670s, with the war as the main cause, could be attributed to the treaty with France, for which De la Gardie had been a spokesman. The hard times came to lead to the upheavals in 1680. The financial crisis in Sweden, made King Charles XI assemble the Riksdag of the Estates in October 1680. Here, the king finally pushed through the reduction ordeal, something that had been discussed in the Riksdag since 1650. It meant that any land or object previously owned by the crown and lent or given away — including counties, baronies and lordships - could be recovered. In principle, the entire Swedish elite of nobles was demolished.

Another important decision made during the assembly was that concerning the Privy Council. Since 1634, it had been mandatory for the king to take the advice from this council. During the Scanian War, the members of the council had internal feuds, and the king more or less ruled without listening to their advice. At the 1680 assembly, he asked the estates whether he was still bound to the council, to which the estates gave him his desired reply: "he was not bound by anyone other than himself", and thereby the absolute monarchy was formally established in Sweden. De la Gardie had tried to rally the members of the Privy Council to withstand the development leading to absolutism, but in vain.

Prior to the Riksdag, De la Gardie had been removed from the Lord High Chancellor office and instead been made Lord High Steward. Thus, De la Gardie lost influence in general and on the country's foreign policy in particular.

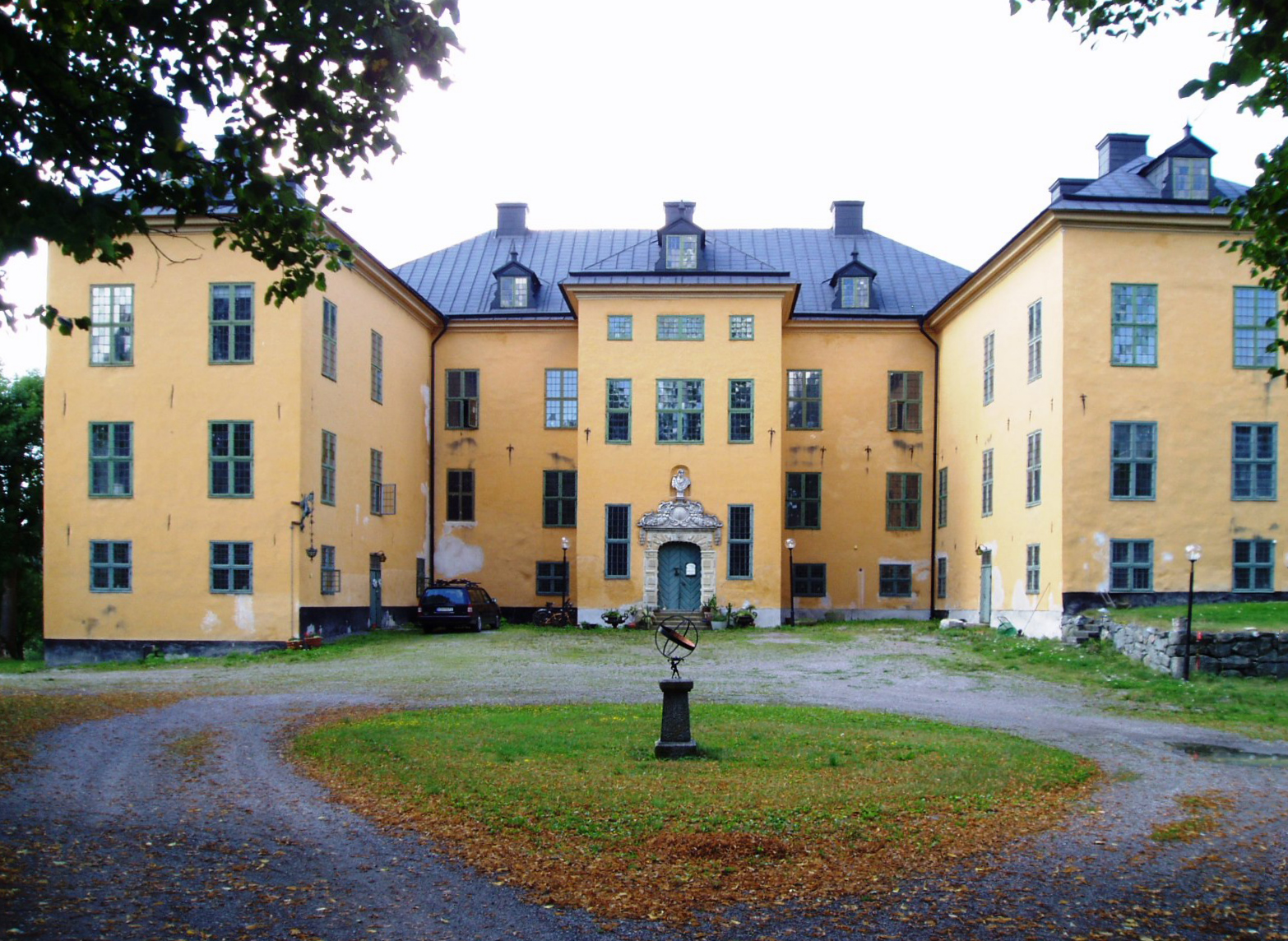
Venngarn Castle

Perhaps no other man was as negatively affected by the reduction as De la Gardie. He was judged owing the state a huge sum (352,159 daler silvermynt) and lost his whole fortune through the recoveries made by the Crown. For example, his Läckö estate was recovered in one and a half days. The only estates he could keep were Venngarn and Höjentorp. In 1675 a special commission was appointed to inquire into the doings of De la Gardie and his high aristocratic colleagues, and on 27 May 1682 it decided that the regents and the senate were solely responsible for dilapidations of the realm, the compensation due by them to the crown being assessed at 4,000,000 riksdaler. De la Gardie was treated with relative leniency, but he "received permission to retire to his estates for the rest of his life". Spending his final days on Venngarn, he could not understand what crimes he had committed. Desperately, he concluded that "what I have acquired during 38 years, and my father and ancestors during 40 years, is gone". Magnus Gabriel De la Gardie died at Venngarn on 26 April 1686.

De la Gardie had been partly responsible for the treaty with France and had worked hard to increase the young King Charles's power. It might seem ironic that the treaty helped moving Sweden into a deep crisis financially, which, together with the level of power Charles had attained, in turn led to the reduction. Thus, De la Gardie contributions came to be a large factor behind his own fall from power and richness.

== Personal life ==
=== Wife and children ===
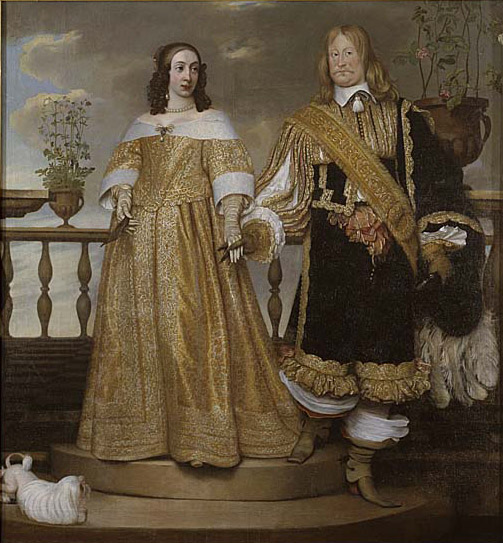
Magnus Gabriel De la Gardie with his spouse Maria Eufrosyne. Painting from 1653 by Hendrik Munnichhoven. (Note: The picture is filled with symbolic details: Magnus Gabriel is standing lower than his wife because she is sister of the king; they holding hands is symbolizing fidelity, as is the dog; the bean in Maria Eufrosyne's hand is showing that she is pregnant. The painting is regarded as one of the finest from the early Swedish baroque era.)

On 7 March 1647, in the chapel at the Royal Palace Tre Kronor, De la Gardie married Maria Eufrosyne of Zweibrücken. Maria Eufrosyne was a cousin of Queen Christina and a sister of the future king Charles X Gustav. Sources describe her as a "poor princess" that "benefited greatly by her wedding with the richest of the Swedish magnates". The queen, who had mediated to make the marriage possible, arranged the wedding.

The marriage of Magnus Gabriel and Maria Eufrosyne is reported as having been happy. Maria Eufrosyne gave birth to eleven children, of whom only three survived their own parents. These three were Privy Councillor Gustaf Adolf (1647–95), Catharina Charlotta (1655–97, wife of Field Marshal Otto Wilhelm Königsmarck) and Hedvig Ebba (c. 1659 – 1700, wife of Count Carl Gustaf Eriksson Oxenstierna).

=== Property owner and constructor ===
Läckö Castle

During his life, De la Gardie succeeded in adding large numbers of estates and castles to his possession. In his prime, he owned estates and castles in the provinces of Uppland, Närke, Västmanland and Västergötland. Among these were Karlberg, Drottningholm, Jakobsdal (now: Ulriksdal), Venngarn, Ekholmen, Kägleholm, Läckö, Traneberg, Mariedal, Katrineberg and Höjentorp. Moreover, De la Gardie owned large properties in Livonia, Finland, Pomerania and Mecklenburg, at the time all parts of Sweden.

Every nobleman needed a well-suited place to live in the capital Stockholm. Magnus Gabriel De la Gardie's father, Jacob, built a grand palace close to the royal palace. It was called the De la Gardie Palace, or Makalös Palace. When Jacob died in 1652, it was inherited by Magnus Gabriel. The palace was the foremost among the private residences in Stockholm, and contained movable property more magnificent than what the royal palace did.

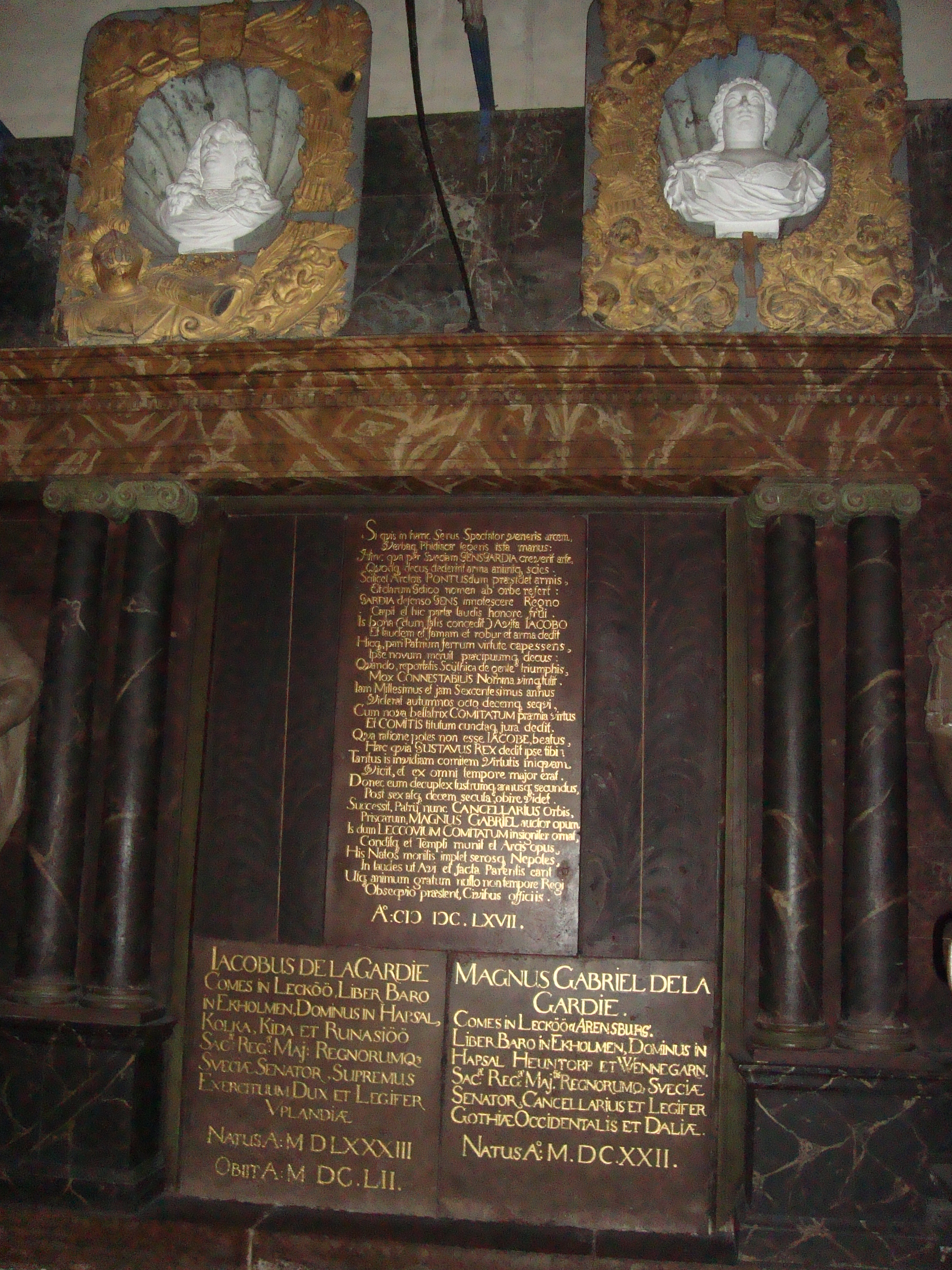
The De la Gardie family mausoleum in the abbey church of Varnhem. Statues of Magnus Gabriel De la Gardie (right) and his father Jacob.

De la Gardie is known as being an eager constructor and the amount of different building projects he was running was huge. In 1674, the Italian diplomat Lorenzo Magalotti estimated that De la Gardie had at least 50 on-going projects in Sweden and its provinces, excluding the 37 churches he was constructing or repairing at the time. One of the churches De la Gardie restored was the abbey church of Varnhem, in which he established a family mausoleum where Magnus Gabriel himself, his wife Maria Eufrosyne, their son Gustav Adolf and daughter-in-law Elisabet Oxenstierna are buried.

At Läckö, De la Gardie ordered considerable extensions, starting in 1654. For example, a fourth floor was added on the keep, as were a castle chapel. The staff of the castle increased from 83 employees to 222 between 1662 and 1678, a sign of the development of the nobility's estates into own societies which was not uncommon at that time.

=== Cultural contributions ===
De la Gardie is considered one of the biggest patrons of science and art in Swedish history. Architects, sculptors and painters were brought to Sweden, to make contributions to De la Gardie's constructions and restorations. Jean de la Vallée and Nicodemus Tessin the Elder were among the architects that De la Gardie engaged to fulfill his building ambitions.

In 1666, De la Gardie made sure Sweden got an organized heritage conservation, the first of its kind in Europe.

=== Codex Argenteus ===
The Codex Argenteus, also known as the "Silver Bible", is a 6th-century manuscript that was brought as war booty from Prague to Sweden at the end of the Thirty Years' War in 1648. Isaac Vossius, a Dutch librarian of Queen Christina took it to his home town. In 1662, De la Gardie bought the codex and in 1669, he donated it to the university, after first having it bound in a chased silver binding.

=== Silver throne ===
A silver throne donated by De la Gardie holds a central position in Rikssalen in Stockholm Palace. The throne was a gift from De la Gardie to Queen Christina for her coronation in 1650. De la Gardie engaged Abraham Drentwett of Augsburg to produce it.

== Cultural reference ==
De la Gardie's ancestral home provides a chilling backdrop for the short story "Count Magnus" by Montague Rhodes James. However, the title character of the story bears little resemblance to the historical figure.

== Ancestry ==
Ancestors of Magnus Gabriel De la Gardie

8. Jacques De la Gardie
4. Pontus De la Gardie
9. Catherine de Sainte-Colombe
2. Jacob De la Gardie
20. Gustav I of Sweden
10. John III of Sweden
21. Margaret Eriksdotter Leijonhufvud, sister of 27.
5. Sofia Johansdotter Gyllenhielm
22. Hans Klasson Kökkemäster
11. Karin Hansdotter
23. Ingeborg Åkesdotter
1. Magnus Gabriel De la Gardie
24. Joakim Brahe
12. Per Brahe the Elder
25. Margareta Eriksdotter Vasa
6. Magnus Brahe
26. Gustav Olofsson Stenbock
13. Beata Gustafsdotter Stenbock
27. Britta Eriksdotter Leijonhufvud, sister of 21.
3. Ebba Brahe
7. Britta Stensdotter Leijonhuvud
