= Maria Euphrosyne of Zweibrücken =

Swedish princess (1625–1687)

Maria Euphrosyne
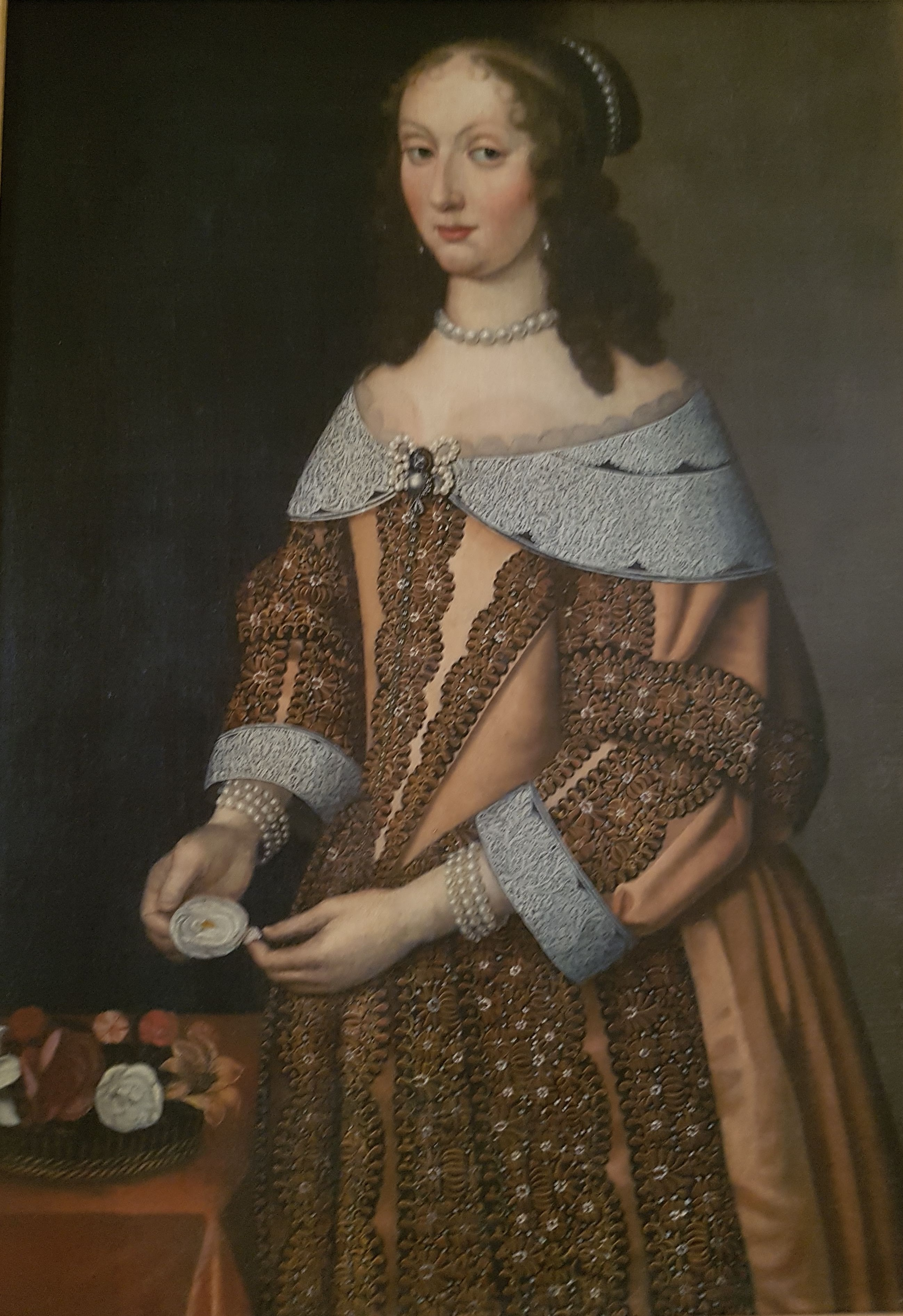
- Born: 14 February 1625; Stegeborg Castle, Östergötland, Sweden
- Died: 24 October 1687 (aged 62); Höjentorp Castle, Västergötland, Sweden
- Spouse: Magnus Gabriel De la Gardie
- Issue: Gustaf Adolf De la Gardie; Catharina Charlotta De la Gardie; Hedvig Ebba De la Gardie
- House: Wittelsbach
- Father: John Casimir, Count Palatine of Kleeburg
- Mother: Catherine of Sweden

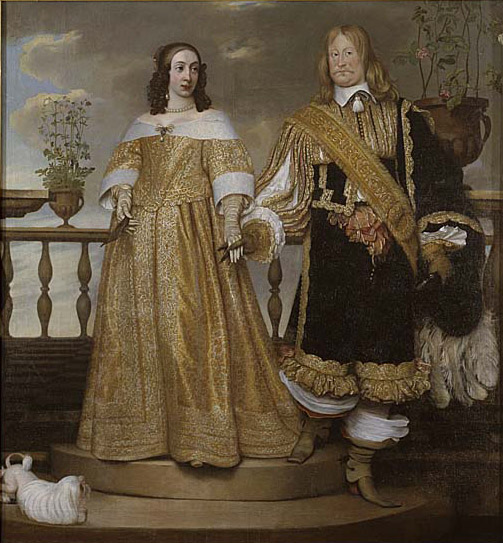
Magnus Gabriel De la Gardie with his spouse Maria Euphrosyne of Pfalz-Zweibrücken, the sister of King Charles X Gustav of Sweden. Painting from 1653 by Hendrik Munnichhoven. The picture is filled with symbolic details: Magnus Grabriel is standing lower than his wife because she is sister of the king; their holding hands symbolizes fidelity; the bean in Maria Euphrosyne's hand shows that she is pregnant. The painting is regarded as one of the finest from the early Swedish baroque era.

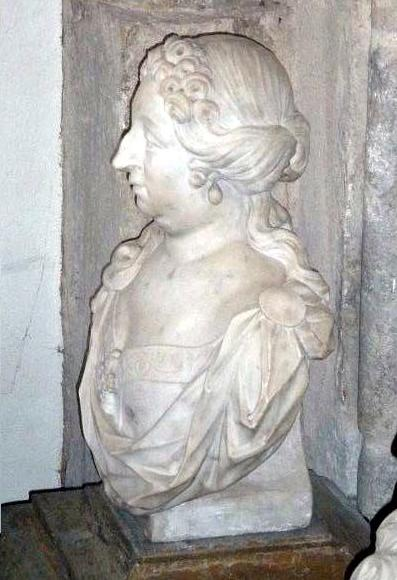
Countess Palatine Maria Euphrosyne of Zweibrücken.

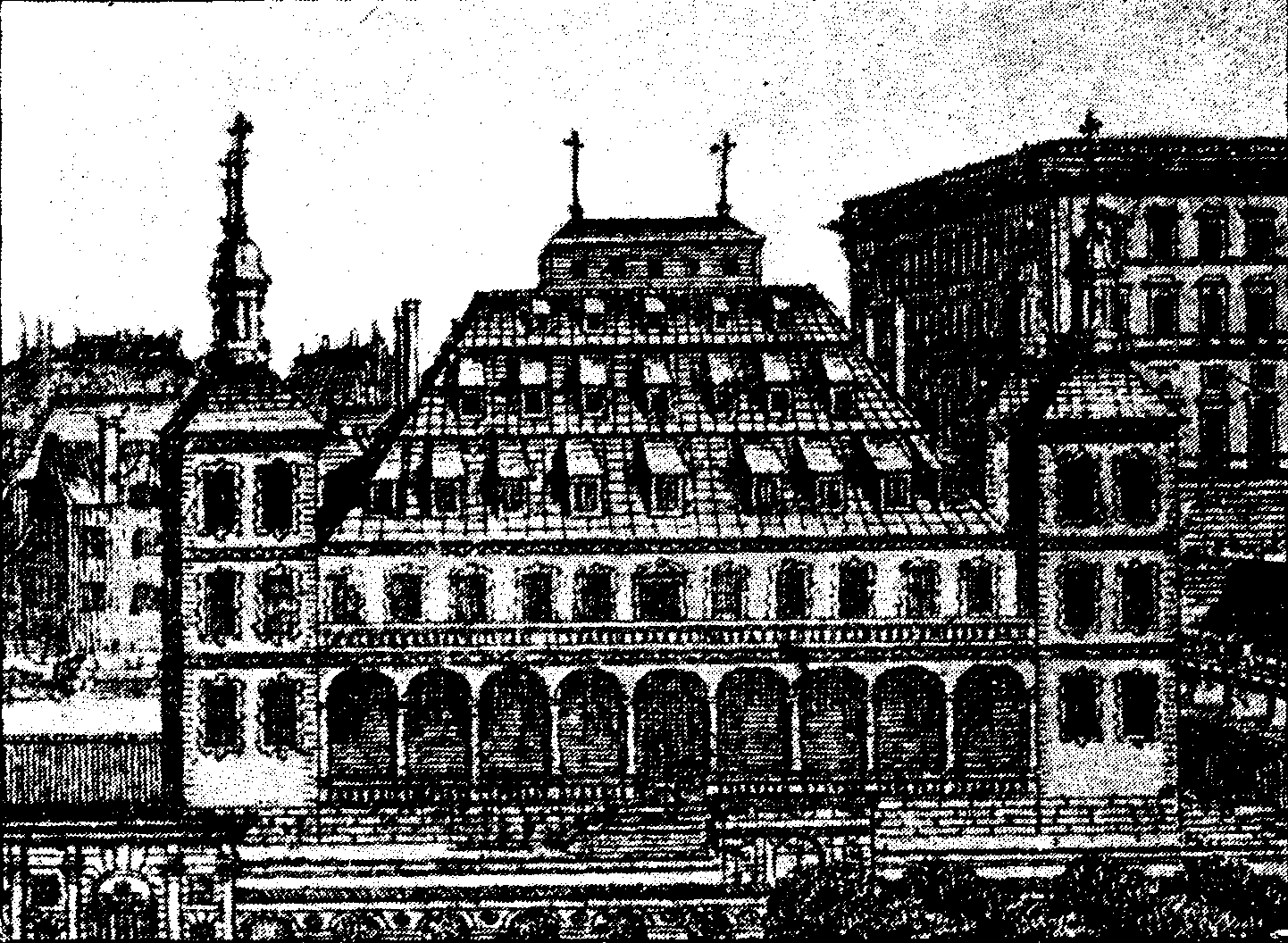
Makalös Palace (Peerless) of the De la Gardie family, across the water from The Royal Castle in Stockholm.

Maria Euphrosyne of Zweibrücken (14 February 1625 – 24 October 1687) was a countess Palatine, the cousin and foster sister of Queen Christina of Sweden, and the sister of King Charles X Gustav of Sweden. She was also, after the accession of her brother Charles X Gustav on the throne (1654), a titular Royal Princess of Sweden.

== Biography ==
=== Early life ===
Maria Euphrosyne was born at Stegeborg Castle, Östergötland, to Count Palatine John Casimir of Zweibrücken and Princess Catherine of Sweden. In 1622, her family fled from Germany during the Thirty Years War and settled in Sweden, her mother's birth country, where Maria Euphrosyne herself was born three years later. She spent her first years at Stegeborg Castle, the fief of her mother. In 1632, her mother was given the responsibility of her cousin, Queen Christina, and Maria Euphrosyne was from that moment brought up with her cousin the Queen: she and her siblings stayed at their court also after the death of their mother in 1638, while their father remained at Stegeborg. Being brought up and tutored alongside her royal cousin Christina, Maria Euphrosyne received a high quality of education in her early years. However, the two cousins would eventually be tutored separately, as Christina's status as monarch required her to learn subjects deemed otherwise unsuitable for female education.

=== During the Reign of Christina ===
In 1643, she received a proposal from Count Henry of Nassau. According to a letter of Christina, Henry was a rich and beautiful Prince who was well liked by Maria Euphrosyne. She left the decision to her father, however: he was uncertain as to whether Henry could support her, and in 1645, after Christina stated that she was fully capable of arranging a marriage for the same status for her relative in Sweden, he denied Henry. On 15 March 1645, Maria Euphrosyne was engaged to the Queen's favorite Count Magnus Gabriel De la Gardie, and on 7 March 1647, she married him in the Royal Chapel of Tre Kronor (castle) in Stockholm. The marriage was arranged by Christina. Traditional myth has regarded this as a love triangle: Christina and Maria Euphrosyne were both believed to have been in love with Magnus Gabriel, and in the end, Christina gave up the plans of marrying him herself, and gave him to her cousin with the words: I give to you what I cannot have myself. A famous play has been written about this drama. It is not known how much of this legendary love triangle is true, however. According to Maria Euphrosyne herself, the purpose was to show them both her favor. In her own memoirs, Maria recounts that Magnus Gabriel had fallen in love with her at the age of eighteen, and the love letters they exchanged during their marriage suggest that Maria Euphrosyne felt strongly affectionate towards her husband. The marriage has, however, not been described as happy. At the wedding, Christina granted her several estates, among them her grandmother's favorite residence Höjentorp, which was also to be her favorite. In addition, Christina also gifted her cousin a great personal allowance, which was later confirmed by her brother upon his succession. In 1653, Magnus Gabriel lost his favor with Christina and was expelled from court, and she tried to act as a mediator. Maria Euphrosyne had a close relationship with her brother Charles, and did what she could to support his planned marriage with Christina.

=== During the Reign of Charles X Gustav and Charles XI ===
At the coronation of her brother King Charles X Gustav in 1654, Maria Euphrosyne was granted the rank and status of a Royal Princess of Sweden. This was opposed by some parts of the nobility. Maria Euphrosyne did not use the title of Countess, but was generally referred to as Princess. Maria Euphrosyne visited both her spouse and her brother in warfare: she visited her spouse in Germany and, in 1656, in Riga in Swedish Livonia, from where she had to flee again with her courtiers after just two weeks when the Russians set fire to the city. During the Dano-Swedish War (1658-1660), she and her sister-in-law Queen Hedvig Eleonora lived at Kronborg in Denmark after it had been taken by the Swedish general Carl Gustaf Wrangel. In 1658, her brother King Charles told her that he wished to make her spouse Lord High Chancellor of Sweden, but she convinced him not to by saying that Magnus Gabriel was more suited for military work. In 1660, she was present at the death bed of her brother in Gothenburg. He promised her great estates in Denmark, pensions for her children, and told her that he had named her consort Lord High Chancellor of Sweden in his will against her wish.

Maria Euphrosyne was very active as a mediator and a spokesperson for supplicants who wished to speak to her spouse or to her brother the King (and later her nephew the King) on their behalf. This matters were not only small things, they also concerned women asking her to use her contacts to acquire offices of great political importance for their male relatives. In the same fashion, she acted as a mediator between her consort and the royal house, especially when he was out of favor. At Karlberg Palace, she received her supplicants in a room with paintings of her royal brother and mother, with a door open to the room where her brother the King had slept when he was a guest in her house. Contemporaries believed she was the reason for Magnus Gabriel's successful career.

In 1676, Lisbeth Carlsdotter, a witness in the Katarina witch trials inspired by the famous Gävle-Boy, tried to implicate Maria Euphrosyne and her sister-in-law Maria Sofia for sorcery. These accusations were not taken seriously, as Carlsdotter's credibility as a witness was quickly dismissed and the entire trial was soon dissolved.

In 1680, Maria's husband lost favor with her nephew, the now-King Charles XI, after the death of Johan Göransson Gyllenstierna. She was denied an audience with her nephew without witnesses and had no success in getting her spouse in favor. After she, by using her contacts, managed to get an audience in private with the King, however, she told him that she hoped Gyllenstierna was now in Hell, and the result was that her spouse was appointed Seneschal. During the great reduction of her nephew King Charles XI in the 1680s, a lot of the property of the family was confiscated by the crown. Maria Euphrosyne was not above using her status as the aunt of the King to avoid confiscation, but she was only moderately successful: in 1685, she was allowed to keep her own personal allowance and her favorite residence, Höjentorp Castle, Västergötland, but the confiscation of her husband's property continued undisturbed. Maria Euphrosyne became a widow in 1686. This was in the middle of the reduction. The King refused to pay for the funeral of her spouse, and to stop the creditors from inventorying her own personal possessions and jewelry as well. She died at Höjentorp.

Maria Euphrosyne was described as religious. She had her German saying »Gott ist mir allés» carved at a wall at Läckö Castle, as well as at a medallion, and in 1681, she anonymously published the German language prayer book »Der geistlich-hungerigen seelen himmelisches manna». In 1682, she wrote her own autobiography.

== Family ==
Maria Euphrosyne married Count Magnus Gabriel De la Gardie on 7 March 1647. She was frequently pregnant, giving birth to eleven children in eighteen years, but only three of them survived to maturity. Of these, only one (Hedvig Ebba) had issue, but her only child himself died childless.

=== Issue ===
1. Gustaf Adolf De la Gardie (1647–1695), unmarried, no issue.
2. Christina Katharina De la Gardie (1648-1648), died in infancy.
3. Jakob August De la Gardie (1650–1661), died in childhood.
4. Johann Kasimir De la Gardie (1651–1651), died in infancy.
5. Karl Magnus De la Gardie (1652–1653), died in infancy.
6. Magnus Gabriel De la Gardie (1654–1667), who died unmarried.
7. Catharina Charlotta De la Gardie (1655-1697), who married Count Otto Wilhelm Königsmarck, no issue.
8. Hedvig Ebba De la Gardie (1659–1700), who married Count Carl Gustaf Eriksson Oxenstierna af Södermöre and had one son, who died childless.
9. Johann Karl De la Gardie (1661–1662), died in infancy.
10. Maria Sophia De la Gardie (1663–1667), died in childhood.
11. Ludwig Pontus De la Gardie (1665–1672), died in childhood.

== Ancestry ==
Ancestors of Maria Euphrosyne of Zweibrücken

8. Wolfgang, Count Palatine of Zweibrücken
4. John I, Count Palatine of Zweibrücken
9. Anna of Hesse
2. John Casimir, Count Palatine of Kleeburg
10. William, Duke of Jülich-Cleves-Berg
5. Magdalene of Jülich-Cleves-Berg
11. Maria of Austria
1. Maria Euphrosyne of the Palatinate-Zweibrücken
12. Gustav I of Sweden
6. Charles IX of Sweden
13. Margaret Leijonhufvud
3. Catherine of Sweden
14. Louis VI, Elector Palatine
7. Maria of the Palatinate-Simmern
15. Elisabeth of Hesse
