= Venngarn Castle =

Coordinates: 59°38′55″N 17°43′11″E

- Sweden
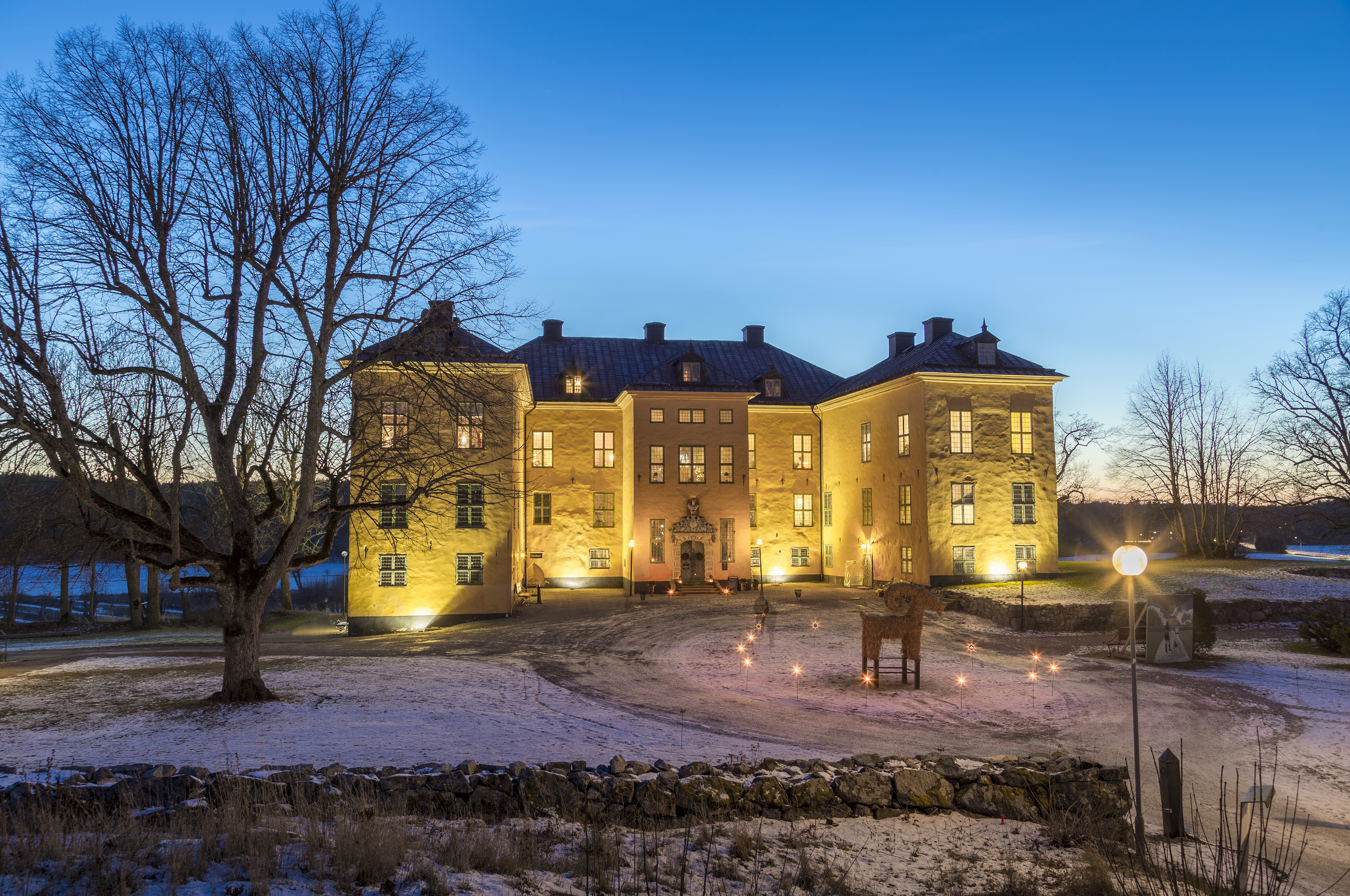
- Venngarns slott

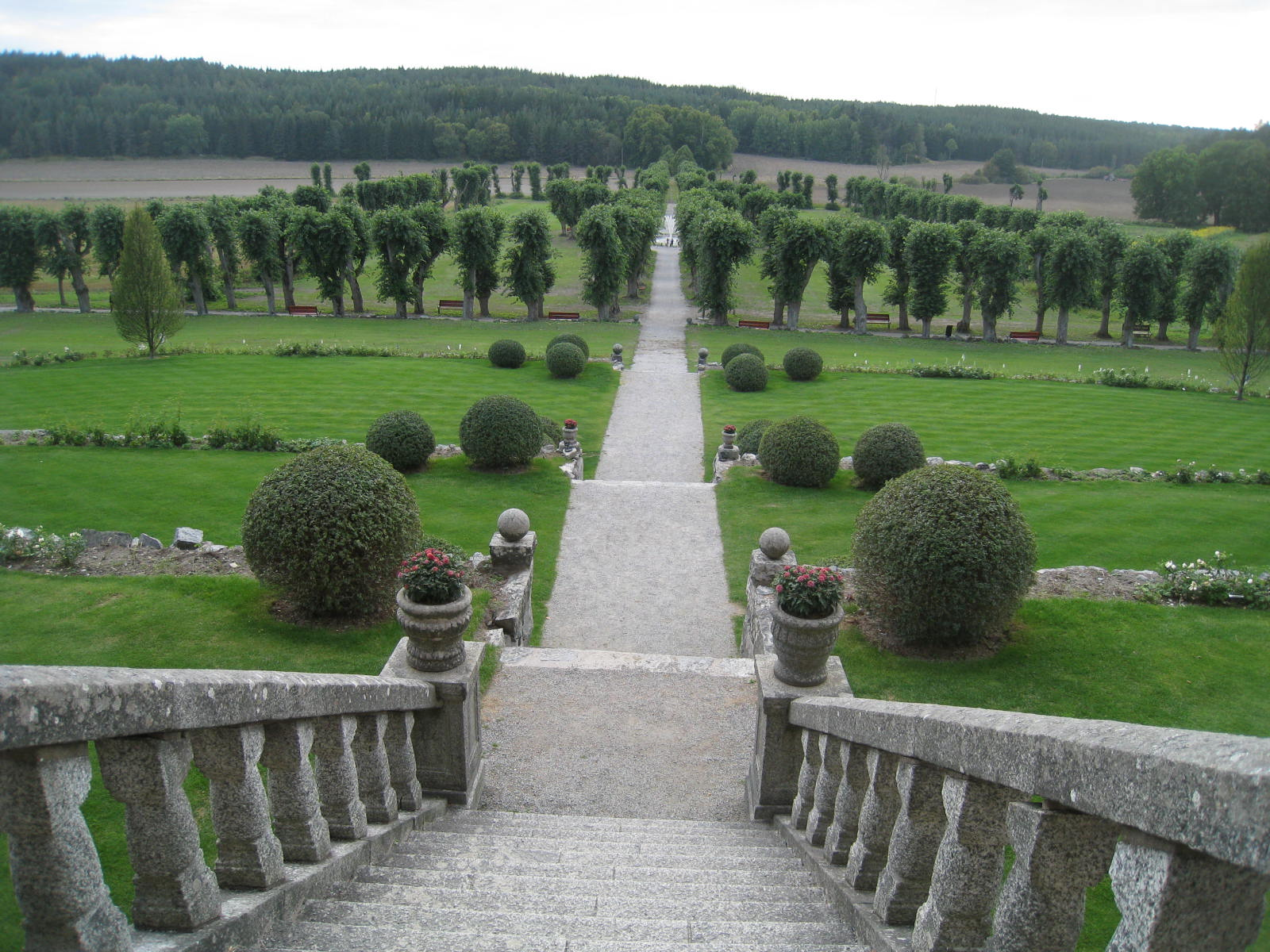
The Baroque garden of Venngarn Castle

Venngarn Castle (Swedish: Venngarns slott) is a non-fortified edifice in Sweden. It is located north of the town of Sigtuna in Uppland.

== History ==
Venngarn was known since at least the 13th century. During the 15th century, the estate was owned by the noble family Banér. In 1441, it was given to Cecilia Haraldsdotter (Gren) upon her marriage to a member of the Banér family: it was inherited by her daughter Sigrid Eskilsdotter (Banér), the maternal grandmother of King Gustav Vasa of Sweden, and through her come to belong to the royal house in 1555. In 1568, it was given to Princess Sophia of Sweden upon her marriage and served as her residence alongside Ekolsund Castle: during the 1590s, the estate was often used by her adult son Gustav of Saxe-Lauenburg (1570–1597).

Venngarn was sold to count Frans Berendt von Thurn in 1619, and bought by Magnus Gabriel de la Gardie (1622–1686) in 1653. The castle was largely built in 1670 for Magnus Gabriel De la Gardie in collaboration with the architect Jean de la Vallée.

Venngarn Castle was confiscated by the crown during the Reduction (Sweden) of Charles XI and has since 1686 been rented out by the crown. In 1916–1997, it served as an institution for the rehabilitation of people suffering from alcoholism, and from 1997, it has served as a health center.

== See also ==
- List of castles in Sweden

== Other sources ==
- Ralph Herrmanns (1985) Slott och herremanshus i Södermanland, Uppland och Västmanland (Prisma) ISBN 91-518-1845-0.
- Fredric Bedoire (2006) Svenska slott och herrgårdar, En historisk reseguide (Albert Bonniers Förlag) ISBN 91-0-010577-5.
