= Hendrik Munnichhoven =

17th-century Dutch painter

Hendrick Munnichhoven
- Born: Utrecht
- Died: August 1664; Stockholm, Sweden
- Occupation: Painter
- Known for: Copyist style

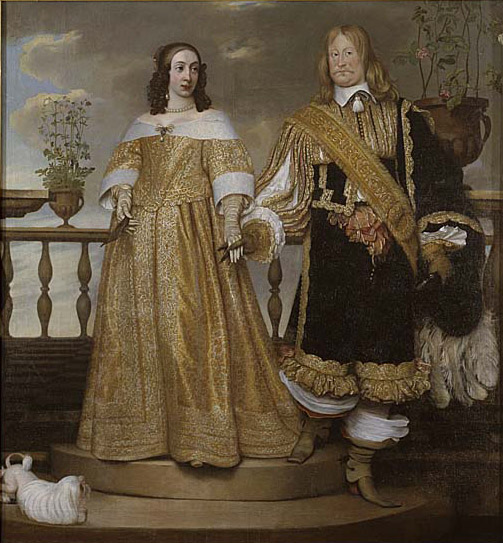
Magnus Gabriel De la Gardie with his spouse Maria Eufrosyne of Pfalz-Zweibrücken, the sister of King Charles X of Sweden. Painting from 1653 by Hendrik Munnichhoven. The picture is filled with symbolic details: Magnus Grabriel is standing lower than his wife because she is sister of the king; their holding hands symbolizes fidelity; the bean in Maria Eufrosyne's hand shows that she is pregnant. The painting is regarded as one of the finest from the early Swedish baroque era.

Hendrick Munnichhoven (or Hendrik Munnikhoven, Münnichhoven, Munnichhoven, Munnekus, Munnikus, Monnickes), probably born in Utrecht, (died August 1664, Stockholm) was a Dutch painter. He became a master in the Utrecht Guild of Saint Luke in 1627 or 1633 and its dean in 1643. The same year he moved to The Hague as court painter of Frederick Henry, Prince of Orange. He was hired in 1650 by Queen Christina of Sweden and was commissioned to paint several portraits. Munnikhoven was mainly active as a copyist of other artists' works; one of his copies of David Beck's painting of Magnus Gabriel De la Gardie is on display at Gripsholm Castle.

In 1648 he joined the service of Magnus Gabriel De la Gardie in Prague; he accompanied De la Gardie to Leipzig, Riga and Stockholm during the next years. He performed several portraits of De la Gardie and his relatives. When Queen Christina abdicated in 1654 he moved to Charles X Gustav of Sweden's services and portraited in the following years the King and Queen Hedvig Eleonora.

In 1660 he moved to Riga, but his stay there was short-lived and he returned to Stockholm, where he died in 1664. His older sister Barbara Swever took over his paint shop.

== Works ==
Of his Swedish production, he performed including three major paintings for De la Gardie, a painting of Hercules, Venus and Cupid, Venus with a full-length and one with Mars on a drum. Although these works have been lost, there are a number of surviving portraits of Munnichhoven own as well as copies of others' works. His works include the large double portrait of De la Gardie and Countess Palatine Maria Eufrosyne of Zweibrücken, as well as that of Beata Elisabet von Königsmarck.
