= Eva Ekeblad =

Swedish agriculturalist (1724–1786)

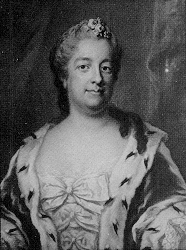
- Eva Ekeblad
- Born: 10 July 1724; Stockholm, Sweden
- Died: 15 May 1786 (aged 61); Skaraborg County, Sweden
- Citizenship: Swedish
- Known for: Making flour and alcohol from potatoes (1746)
- Spouse: Claes Claesson Ekeblad (m. 1740; died 1771)
- Children: 7, including Hedda Piper
- Awards: Membership in the Royal Swedish Academy of Sciences (1748)
- Scientific career
- Fields: Agronomy

Notes
- First woman in the Royal Swedish Academy of Sciences: full member 1748–51, honorary member 1751–86

Eva Ekeblad (née De la Gardie; 10 July 1724 – 15 May 1786) was a Swedish agriculturist and salon hostess. She discovered a method to make alcohol and flour from potatoes, significantly reducing Sweden's incidence of famine. She became the first female member of the Royal Swedish Academy of Sciences.

Ekeblad was the first female member of the Royal Swedish Academy of Sciences (1748).

== Early life ==
Eva Ekeblad (born Eva De la Gardie) was born on 10 July 1724 in Stockholm, Sweden, the daughter of Hedvig Catharina Lillie and Count Magnus Julius De la Gardie, a state marshal and privy councillor. Ekeblad was the tenth of fourteen children. Of her nine older siblings, only two survived childhood.

Ekeblad grew up in a politically active aristocratic household. Her mother participated in politics and hosted salons attended by members of the Hats. Ekeblad received private instruction at home as part of an education considered appropriate to her social rank.

== Marriage and children ==
In 1740, Eva married at the age of 16 the riksråd count Claes Claesson Ekeblad, and became the mother of seven children; one son and six daughters, Claes Julius Ekeblad (1742–1808) and Hedda Piper among them. Their spouses belonged to the elite of the Swedish nobility.

In the Ekeblad residence in Stockholm, she hosted a cultural salon and was described by the wife of the Spanish Ambassador de marquis de Puentefuerte as "one of few aristocratic ladies whose honor was considered untainted". The first concert performances of the mass music of Johan Helmich Roman were performed in her salon at the Ekeblad House. She was on friendly terms with queen Louisa Ulrika.

== Career ==
=== Estate management ===
After her marriage, Ekeblad became involved in managing the family's estates in Västergötland, a province in southwestern Sweden. Her father, the Swedish nobleman Magnus Julius De la Gardie, gave her Mariedal Castle and Lindholmen Castle as part of her dowry, while her husband owned Stola Manor. Because Claes Ekeblad was frequently absent on political business, Ekeblad took responsibility for managing all three estates.

Her responsibilities included supervising the estates' bailiffs and presiding over local assemblies in the parishes where the properties were located. She was described as an authoritative manager who intervened in disputes and protected peasants on the estates from abuses by bailiffs, while expecting obedience in return. Stola Manor became known for its orderly management.

After her husband's death in 1771, the 47-year-old Ekeblad continued to manage her property. Mariedal and Lindholmen became her dower estates, with Mariedal serving as her main residence. She also initially retained responsibility for Stola Manor because her only son, the diplomat Claes Julius Ekeblad, was frequently absent. Ekeblad remained an estate owner until her death in 1786.

=== Scientific discoveries ===
Ekeblad experimented with potatoes, which had been introduced to Sweden in 1658, but were only cultivated in the greenhouses of aristocrats. She discovered how to make starch from them which could then be ground and sifted. She developed a bread recipe using oat flour and mashed potatoes, and also described a method for the preparation of potato liquor from the same.

She promoted replacing dangerous ingredients such as arsenic in cosmetic powders with potato flour. She is said to have advertised the plant by using its flowers as hair ornaments.

=== Royal Swedish Academy of Sciences ===
In 1748, Ekeblad sent the Royal Swedish Academy of Sciences a description of her experiments with potatoes, together with samples of the products she had made. Her work was presented to the Academy on 5 November and reviewed by Academy members Jonas Alströmer and Jacob Faggot. They reported favourably on it on 19 November. Her essay, Försök at tilverka bröd, brännvin, stärkelse och puder af potatos ("Attempts at producing bread, spirits, starch and powder from potatoes"), was published by the Academy that year.

On 3 December 1748, aged 24, Ekeblad was elected to the Academy, becoming its first female member. In considering her election, Academy members noted that learned women were admitted to academies in other countries and referred to the French mathematician and natural philosopher Émilie du Châtelet. They cited Ekeblad's interest in conducting experiments and the possibility that she would continue to provide useful findings to the Academy. The Academy also hoped that her election would encourage other women to develop products useful to Swedish households.

There is no record that Ekeblad attended meetings of the Academy. On 19 January 1751, when she was 26, the Academy recorded that she was no longer counted among its ordinary members under an earlier agreement. She nevertheless continued to submit work to the Academy.

=== Later experiments ===
Ekeblad continued to conduct practical experiments after joining the Royal Swedish Academy of Sciences. On 7 December 1751, aged 27, she presented the Academy with a method for making soap for bleaching cotton cloth. Four months later, on 4 April 1752, she submitted further experiments on bleaching cotton yarn. Both contributions were published in the Academy's proceedings.

Her 1752 paper, Beskrifning på tvål, som är tjenlig til bom-ulls-garns blekning ("Description of a soap suitable for bleaching cotton yarn"), appeared in volume 13 of the Academy's proceedings, on pages 57–59. It is the last scientific work by Ekeblad listed in the Svenskt biografiskt lexikon.

== Later life ==
In November 1778, Eva Ekeblad attended the royal court by making use of her rank in her capacity as riksrådinna (wife or widow of a riksråd) and was present as a witness at the birth of the future Gustav IV Adolf of Sweden. She stayed in the capital for two years, during which time she was much celebrated. She was offered to succeed Ulrika Strömfelt as överhovmästarinna (chief lady-in-waiting) to the queen, as well as offered the position of royal governess for the Crown Prince.

However, though she was reportedly flattered, she was forced to refuse the offers of a position at court because her hitherto good health was affected by an illness that year which left her much weakened and made her periodically bedridden for her remaining eight years.

She spent her last six years in Mariedal Castle, where she continued to be celebrated by the local aristocracy until she died.

== In popular culture ==
Ekeblad was featured in a Google Doodle on 10 July 2017.

== See also ==
- Elsa Beata Bunge
- Maria Christina Bruhn
- Charlotta Frölich
- De la Gardie
- Timeline of women in science
