= Karlberg Palace =

Palace in Solna Municipality, Sweden

Coordinates: 59°20′28″N 18°01′19″E

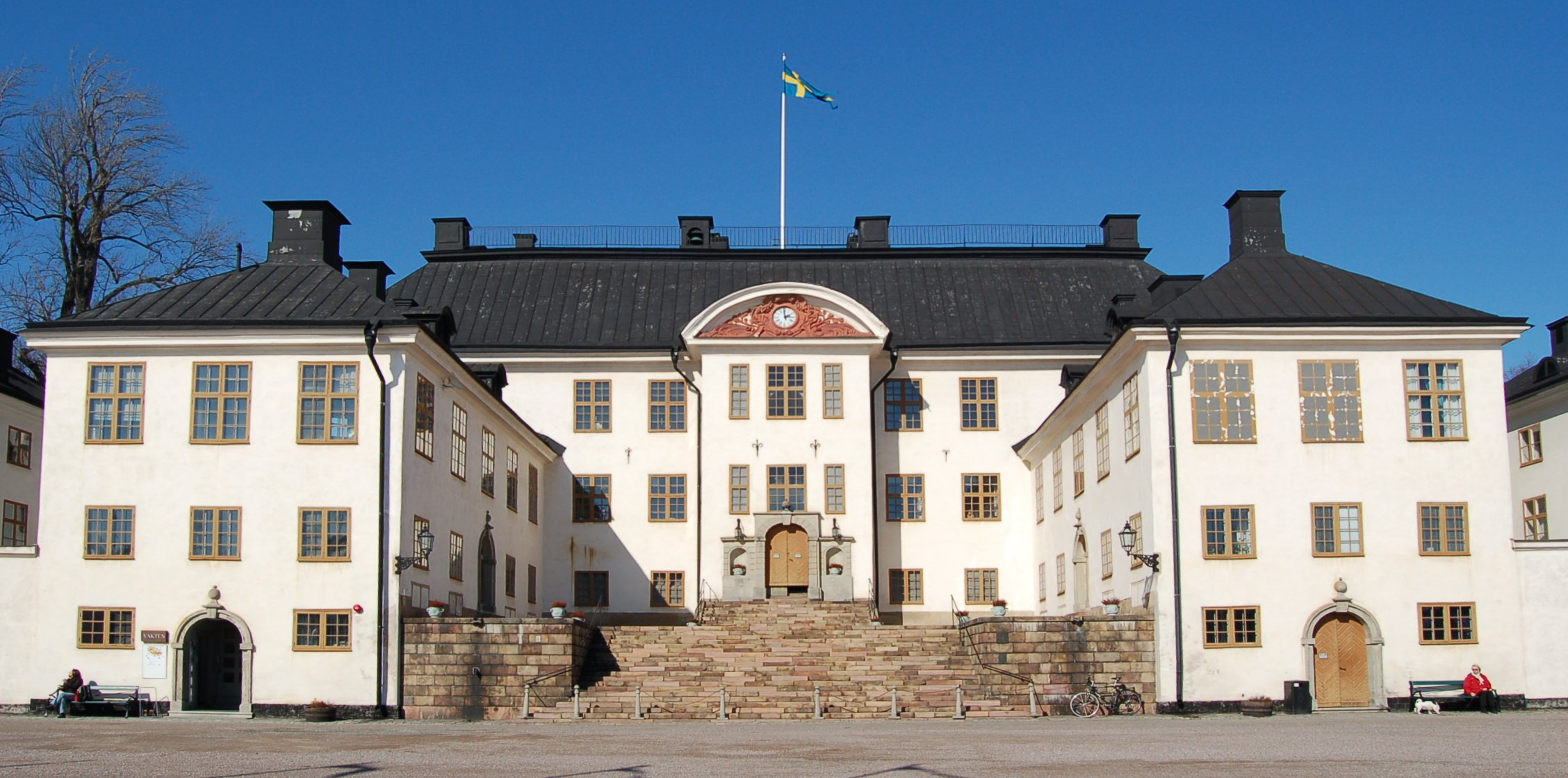
- Main building, south façade

General information
- Architectural style: Neo Classicism
- Location: Solna, Sweden
- Construction started: 1634
- Completed: 1795; 231 years ago
- Client: Carl Carlsson Gyllenhielm, Magnus Gabriel de la Gardie
- Owner: The State
- Landlord: Swedish Fortifications Agency

Design and construction
- Architects: Carl Christoffer Gjörwell, Louis Jean Desprez (1791-93), Jean de la Vallée (1670-80)

Karlberg Palace (Swedish: [kaɭˈbærj]) is a palace by the Karlberg Canal in Solna Municipality in Sweden, adjacent to Stockholm's Vasastaden district. The palace, built in 1630, today houses the Military Academy Karlberg.

In the palace park are found, among other things, a "temple of Diana" (originally dedicated to Neptune) and the burial site of Pompe, the dog of King Charles XII.

Notwithstanding that the palace remains a military institution, the palace park is accessible to the public and is open daily between 6 AM and 10 PM.

== History ==
=== Gyllenhielm ===
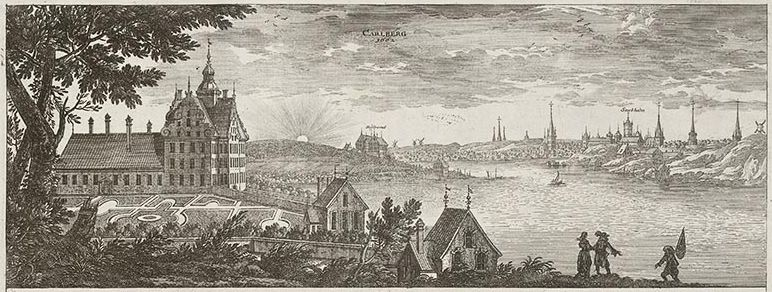
Karlberg in 1662 according to Suecia Antiqua et Hodierna.

Three medieval villages at the location — Ösby, Bolstomta, and Lundby — were bought by Lord High Admiral Carl Carlsson Gyllenhielm (1574–1650) in the 1620s and subsequently unified into a single estate named "Karlberg" after himself. He then had master mason Hans Drisell build a Renaissance palace featuring pink plaster and tall gables.

As Gyllenhielm's widow died six years after her husband, a lengthy litigation regarding the inheritance followed. Plans in the mid-1660s to transfer the estate to the widowed Queen Hedwig Eleonora were cancelled as Lord High Admiral Magnus Gabriel De la Gardie (1622–1686) sold one of his palaces to the queen (today Ulriksdal Palace, also in Solna) and bought Karlberg from the heir of his precursor in 1669.

=== De la Gardie ===
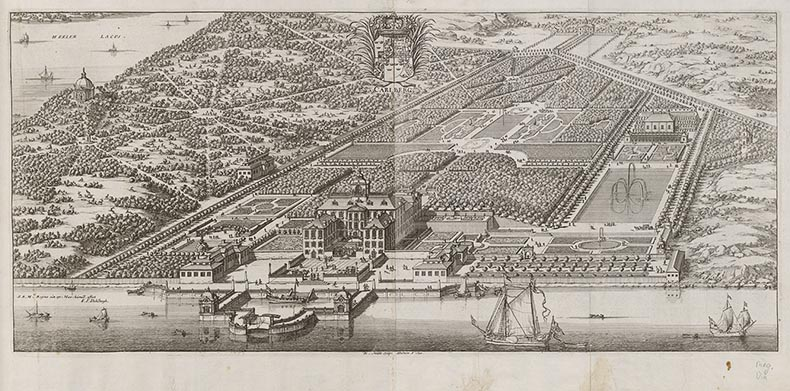
De la Gardie's palace according to Suecia Antiqua et Hodierna, 1690–1710.

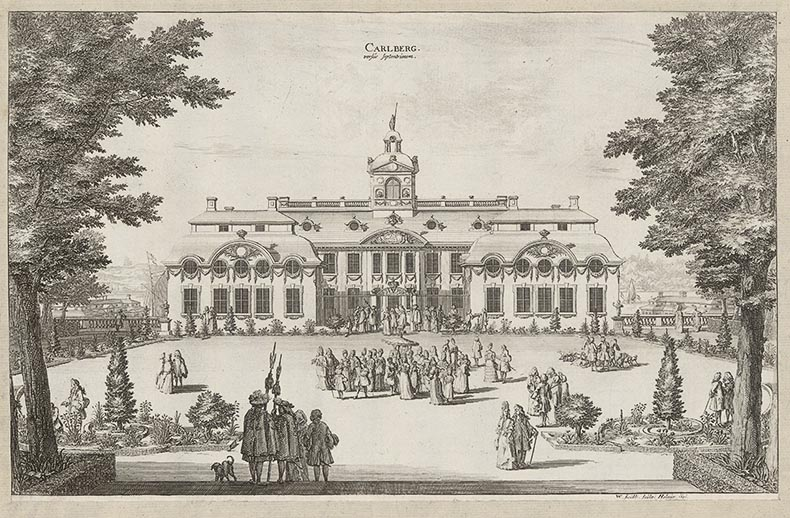
Northern façade in the 1690s according to Suecia Antiqua et Hordierna.

De la Gardie, at this time one of the most influential men in Sweden, had Jean de la Vallée (1620–1696) develop the palace into one of the grandest in Sweden. The new palace, H-shaped in plan in accordance to the style of the day, featured two wings and a terrace facing the waterfront, while wings facing north formed an enclosed courtyard. Additionally, a church was created in the eastern wing. Some of the red festoon stucco ornaments from this era are preserved in the façade, as are the curved cornices facing the garden, and the sumptuous stucco ceilings of Carlo Carove together with other exclusive interior details, including walls covered in leather, velvet, and boiseries. The park was furnished with an orangery, ponds, fountains, parterres, and boxwood patterns - all in the manner of French Baroque architecture.

=== Royal estate ===
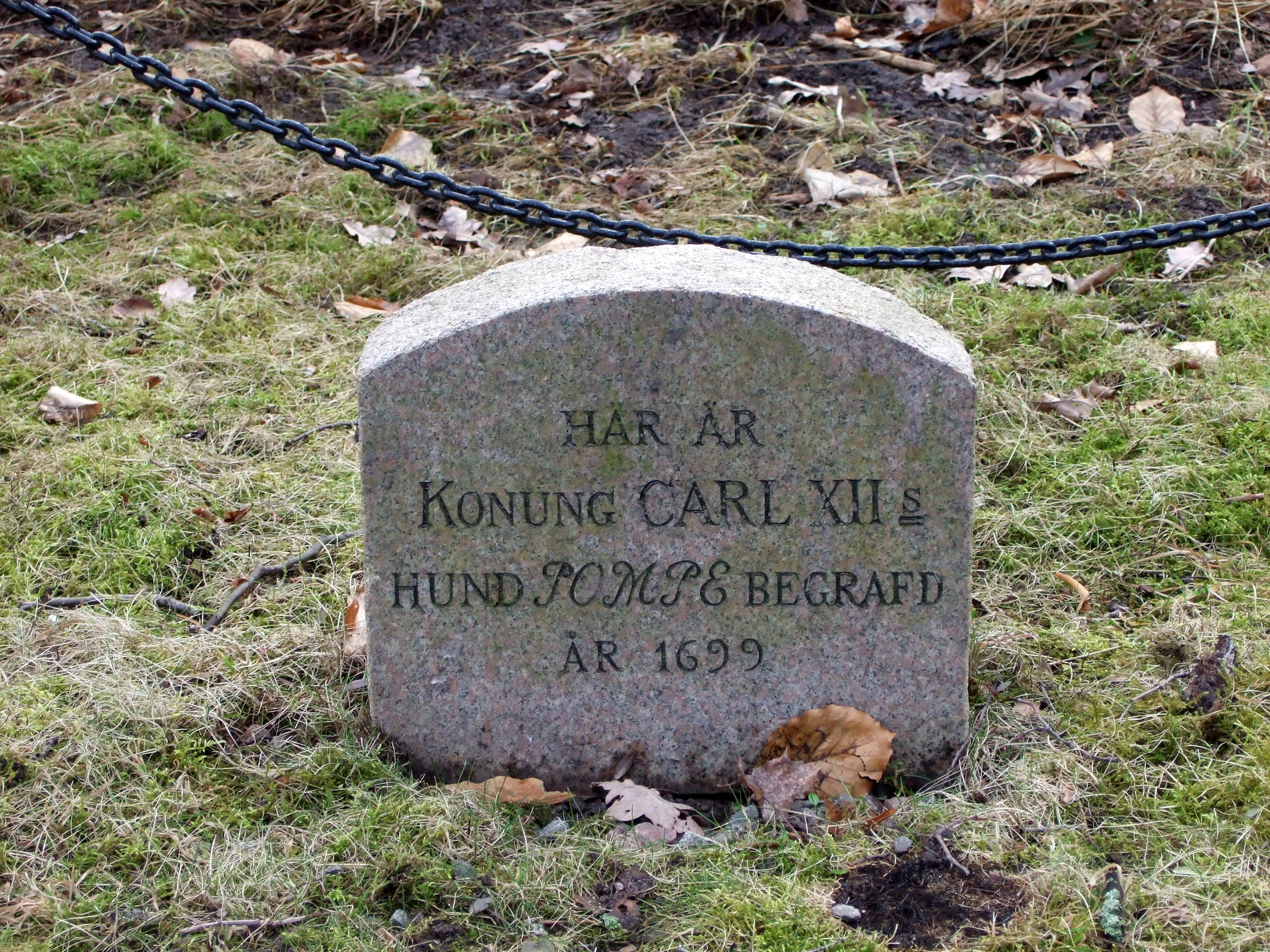
Gravestone of Pompe, Charles XII's dog.

Following the Reduction, De la Gardie lost his influence and most of his fortune, and since King Charles XI declined to buy the palace, De la Gardie was finally forced to hand it over to Johan Gabriel Stenbock to settle a debt, and in 1683 Stenbock took over the newly rebuilt palace, only to sell it to the king in 1688. Karlberg thus became the palace where crown prince Charles spent much of his childhood and where he used to hunt wolves in the surrounding forests. His mother, Queen Ulrika Eleonora (1656 - 1693), had a school, the Tapetskolan vid Karlberg, created for orphaned girls where they could create tapestries. On her death, her son took personal charge over the school to honour his good-hearted mother. When Charles XII died in 1718 his coffin was taken to Karlberg before being interred in the church Riddarholmskyrkan.

While the Three Crowns Castle was being rebuilt in the early 1690s, and following the disastrous fire which destroyed it in 1697, the royal family chose Karlberg as their temporary home. The entire court resided at Karlberg until 1754 when the present palace was finally completed.

The red panelled log houses west of the main building are believed to date back to the 1720s, while the stables carrying four sandstone vessels were designed by Carl Hårleman (1700–1753) under Frederick I (1676–1751) in the 1730s, thereafter rebuilt into barracks in the 1790s.

=== Military academy ===
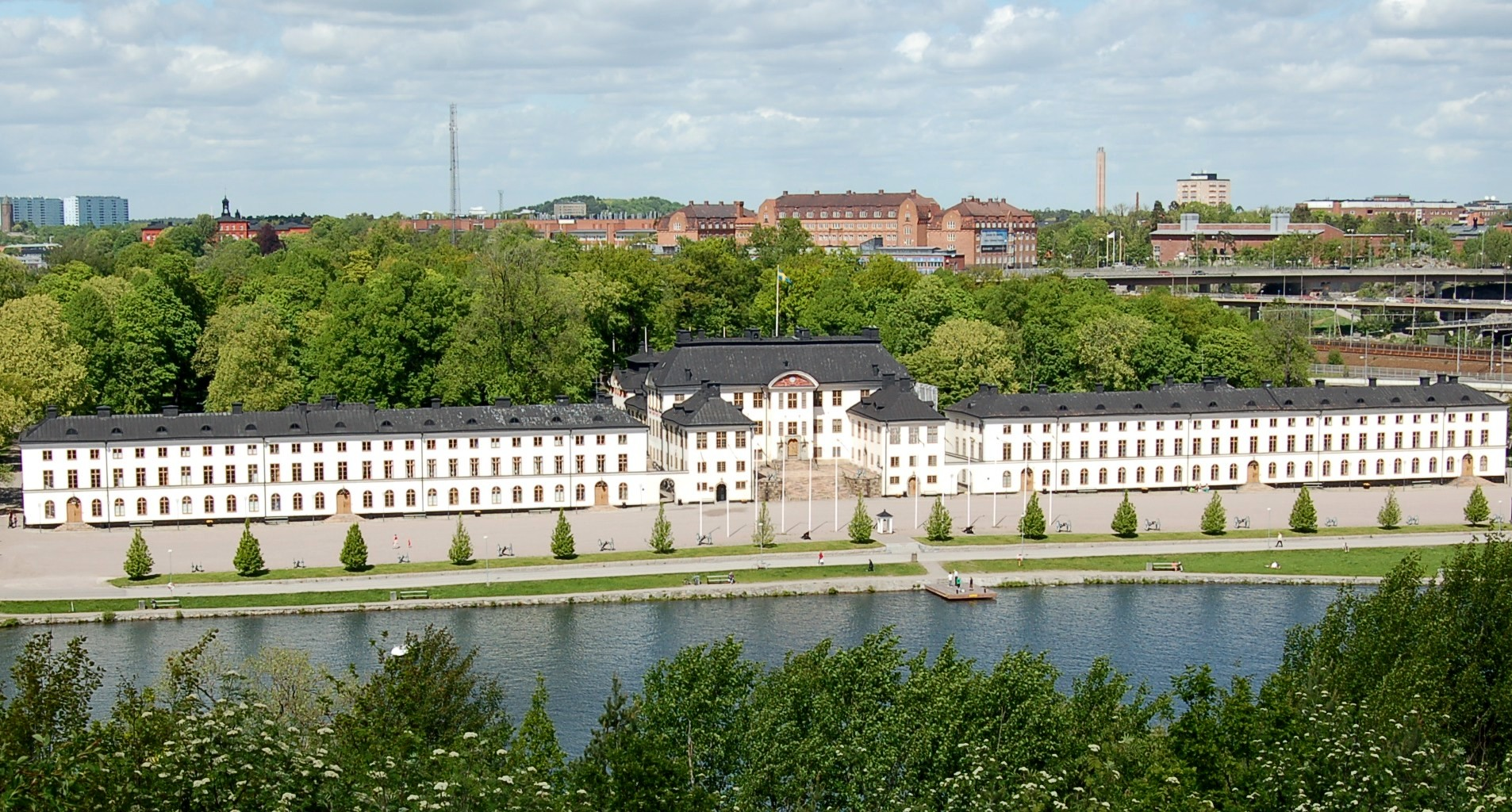
The palace viewed from Kungsholmen.

In 1766, Karlberg was made a wedding gift to crown prince) Gustav (1746–1792) and Sophia Magdalena (1743–1813). In the early 1790s Gustav had plans to found a war academy at the Ulriksdal Palace. These plans however were interrupted by his death in 1792, when his widow choose Ulriksdal as her private residence. The Kungliga Krigacademien ("Royal War Academy") was instead located at Karlberg where the first generation of cadets started their training later the same year. During the regency of Gustav's son, Gustav IV Adolf (1778–1837), architect Carl Christoffer Gjörwell (1766–1837) was ordered to enlarge the palace to accommodate the cadets. His additions, finished in 1796, resulted in the elongated wings seen today, which give the palace much of its character.

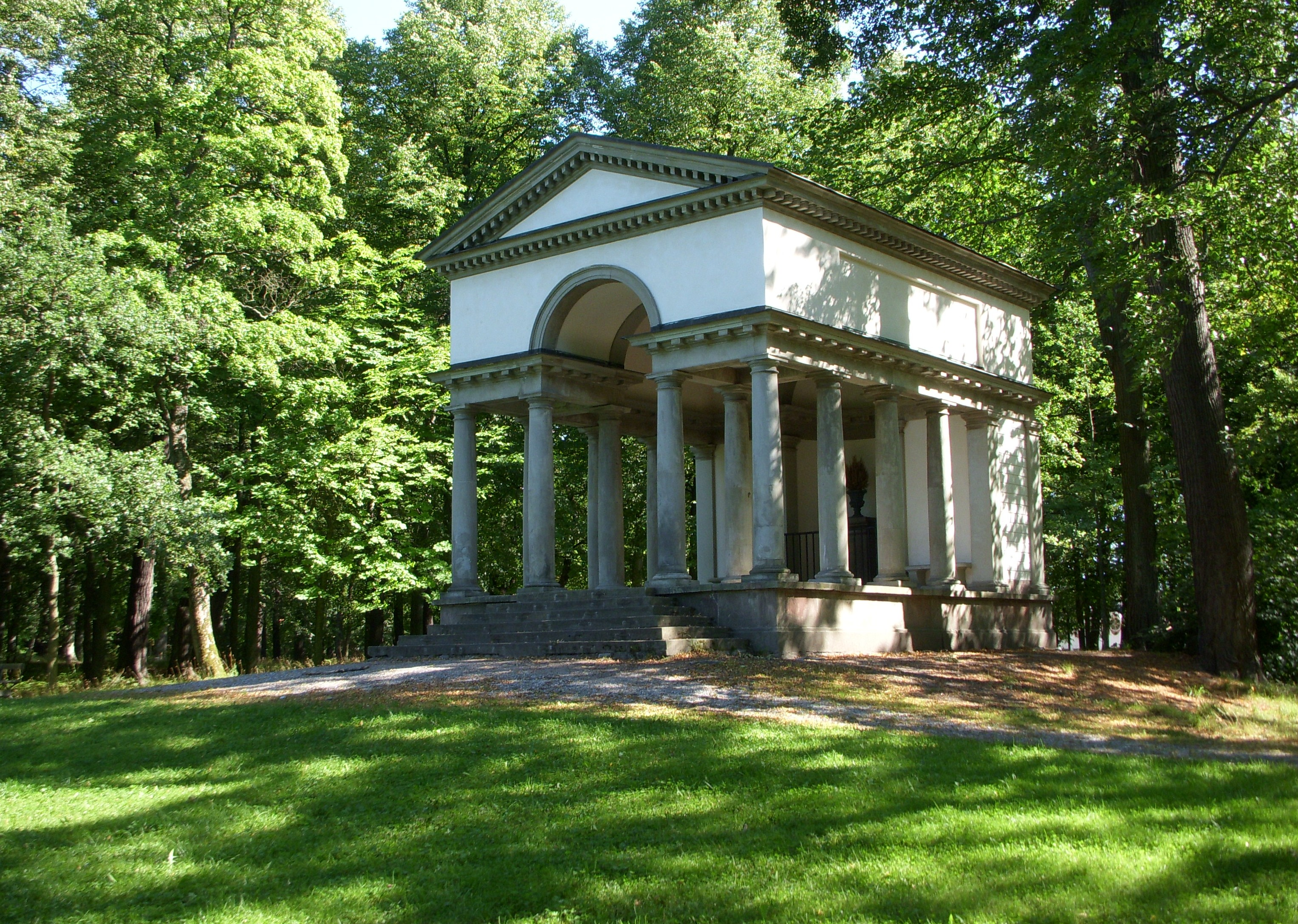
Temple of Diana

=== Modern era ===
The park, dating back to the 17th century, has suffered gradual encroachment. During the 1860s, the north-eastern corner was cut off by the railway, and a century later, in 1966, the Essingeleden freeway was built over more park land. Other motorways have had also been built on part of the park. The exterior of the palace was however restored in the 1980s. Furthermore, in 2001 an archaeological examination of a nearby burial site, associated with one of the villages out of which Karlberg once was created, unveiled fragments of runestones — including one from an image stone and another featuring the proto-Norse Elder Futhark. Karlberg Palace is owned by the State and is managed by the Swedish Fortifications Agency. Karlberg Palace served as the Olympic Village for competitors in equestrian events at the 1956 Summer Olympics.

== See also ==
- History of Stockholm
- Solna Church
- Hilma af Klint, painter, was born here
