= Magnus Julius De la Gardie =

Swedish general and statesman (1668–1741)

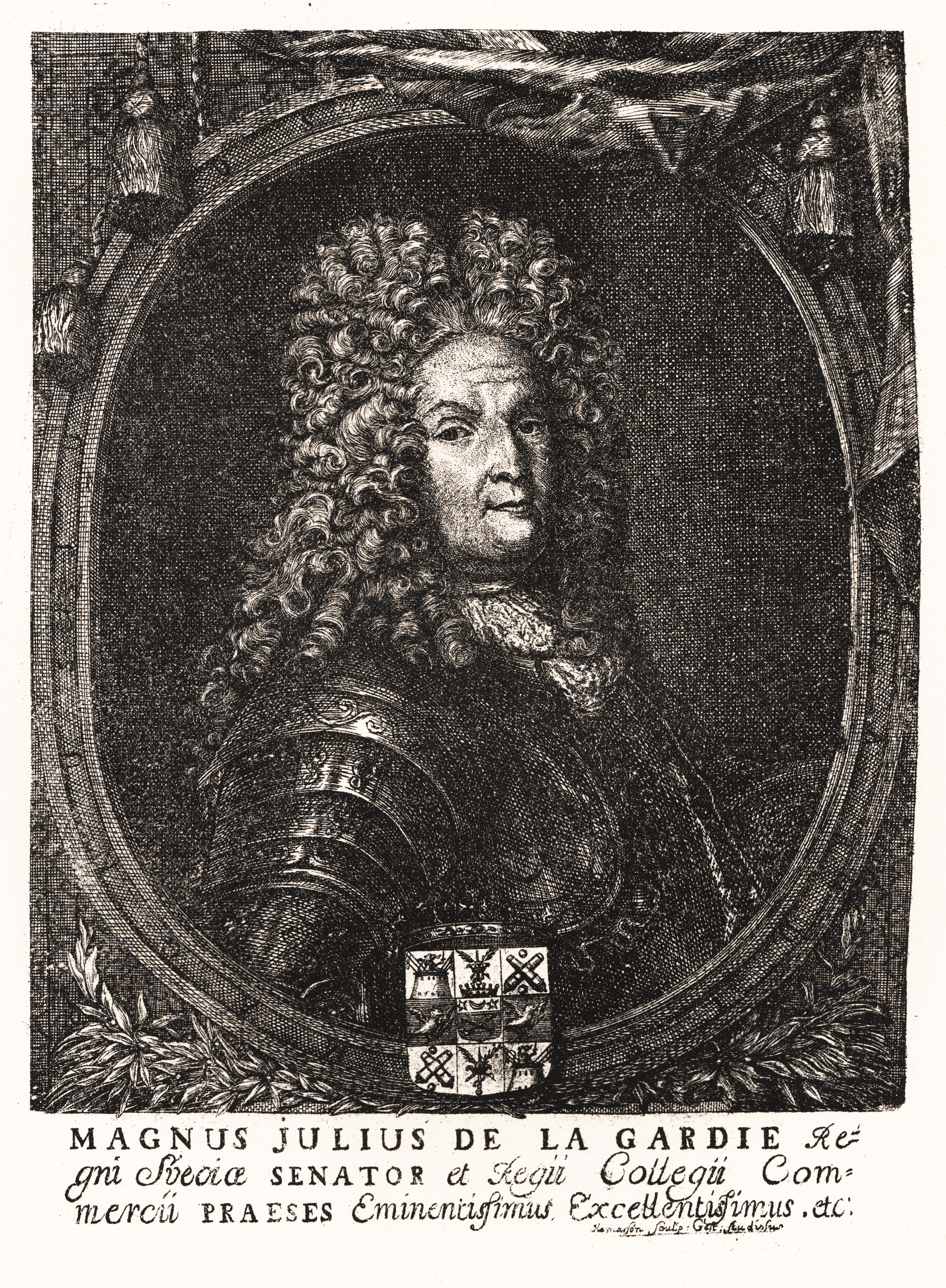
- Engraving of Magnus Julius De la Gardie
- Born: 14 April 1668; Stockholm, Sweden
- Died: 28 April 1741 (aged 73); Stockholm, Sweden
- Spouse: Hedvig Catharina Lilje
- Children: Pontus Fredrik De la Gardie; Eva Ekeblad; Hedvig Catharina De la Gardie
- Relatives: De la Gardie family
- Military career
- Allegiance: Sweden
- Rank: Lieutenant general
- Conflicts: War of the Spanish Succession; Battle of Malplaquet; Great Northern War; Battle of Gadebusch

Magnus Julius De la Gardie (14 April 1668 – 28 April 1741), son of Axel Julius De la Gardie, was a Swedish general and statesman, member of the Swedish Hats Party.

Magnus Julius De la Gardie was born in 1668 in Stockholm. He started his military career in the French army, where he fought for the French in the War of the Spanish Succession. After the Battle of Malplaquet in 1709, he became a Swedish Colonel at the Royal Dalarna Regiment, which he led in the Battle of Gadebusch in 1712. After the successful battle, he was appointed Swedish Major General, and in 1717 he became a Lieutenant General.

After the dramatic death of King Charles XII in 1718, Magnus Julius De la Gardie became a member of the Privy Council of Sweden. The newly appointed Privy Councillor commissioned architect Joseph Gabriel Destain to design Tullgarn Palace. In 1719 he was appointed President of the Kommerskollegium, and in 1727 he became a Marshal.

Magnus Julius De la Gardie was a vocal friend of the French kingdom. When the Riksdag of the Estates was summoned in 1734, he proposed closer ties between Sweden and France. Inspired by French customs, he arranged political salons, a novelty never heard of in Sweden at the beginning of the 18th century. It is believed that the Swedish Hats Party was founded at one of these receptions.

He was married to Hedvig Catharina Lilje and became the father of Pontus Fredrik De la Gardie, Eva Ekeblad and Hedvig Catharina De la Gardie. He died in Stockholm in 1741.

== Sources ==
- Peter Wieselgren, Handlingar ur Grefl. De la Gardiska bibliotheket på Löberöd, Lund : 1831.
- Nordisk Familjebok, Stockholm : Nordisk familjeboks förlags aktiebolag, 2 ed. 1904.
