= Sofia Gyllenhielm =

Swedish noblewoman (1556/1559–1583)

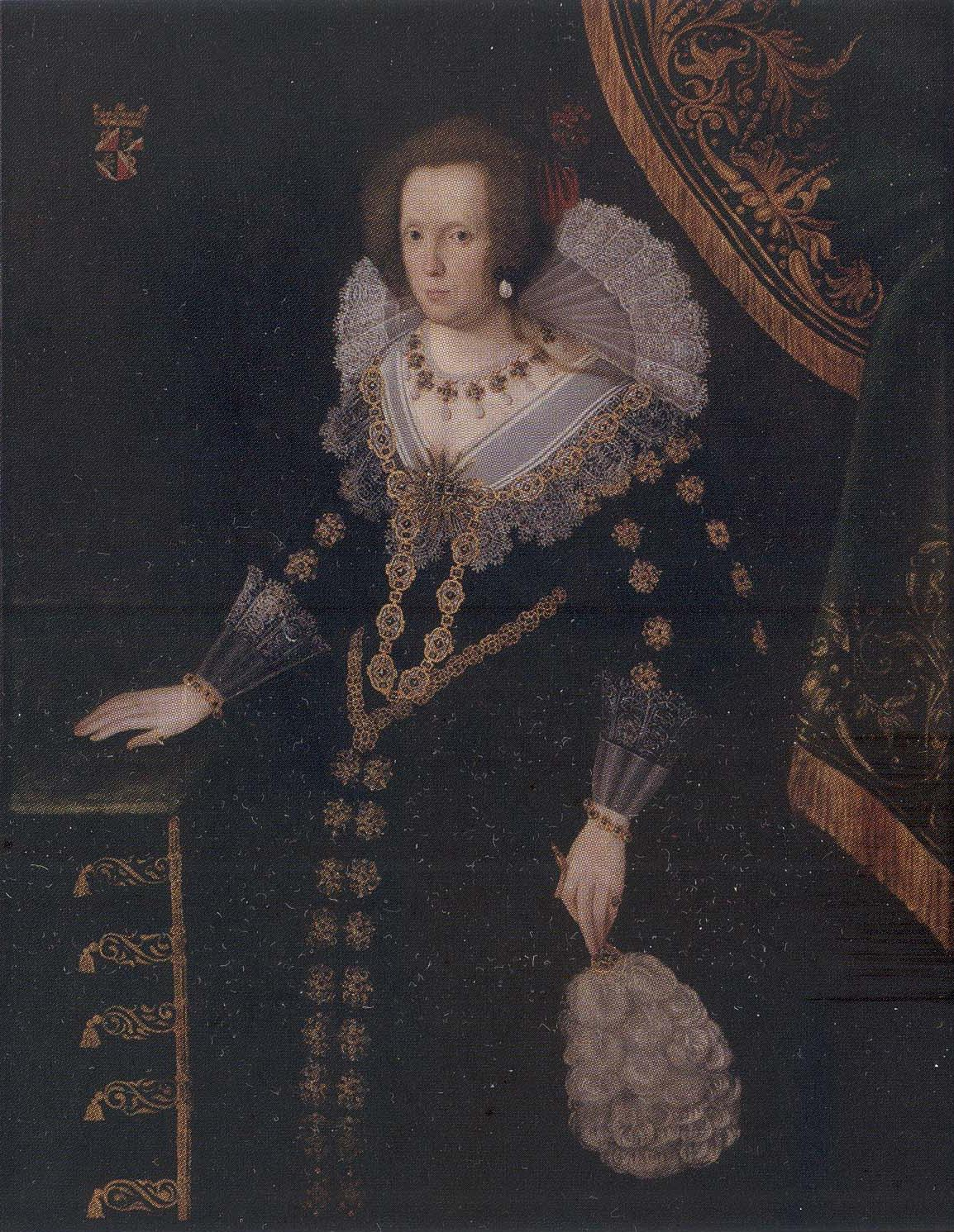
Portrait by Jacob Heinrich Elbfas, c. 1581

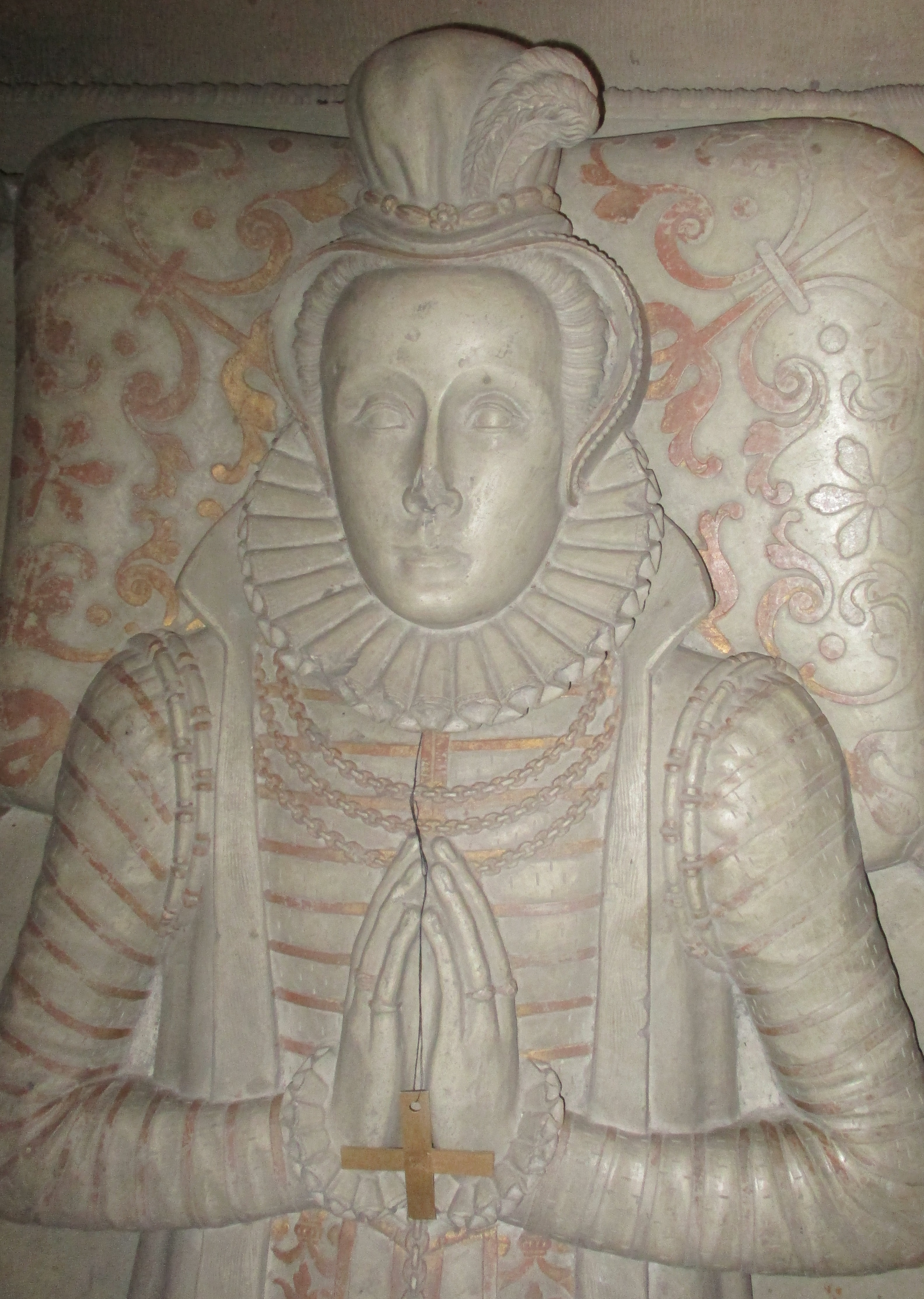
Gyllenhielm as depicted on her grave in Tallinn

Sofia Johansdotter Gyllenhielm (1556/1559 – June 1583) was a Swedish noblewoman, the illegitimate daughter of King John III of Sweden and Karin Hansdotter.

== Life ==
She spent her early childhood with her mother in Turku Castle in the Duchy of Finland. In 1562, she and her brother Julius (1559–1583), though not their younger sister, were removed from their mother's custody and kept in their father's household when he married Catherine Jagiellon. When their father and stepmother were imprisoned in 1563, Gyllenhielm and her brother were given into the care of Anna Andersdotter, spouse of Jöran Persson. Persson accepted a bribe Catherine gave him in exchange for returning the children, but he still did not do so. They were returned to their father when John deposed Eric XIV and took the throne in 1568.

Gyllenhielm became a lady-in-waiting to her aunt Princess Elizabeth of Sweden in 1576. The same year, she was engaged by her father to his favourite, French immigrant Baron Pontus De la Gardie (1520–1585) as a reward for his service for her father. Sofia, her sister Lucretia Gyllenhielm (1561–1585) and their brother Julius were ennobled in 1577 and given the surname Gyllenhielm.

The wedding was held at Vadstena in Östergötland on 14 January 1580. It was a grand ceremony with many guests, and during the ceremony a church gallery collapsed under the weight of the congregation, resulting in the death of one person. This was interpreted by Catholics present as a divine verdict on heretics.

In 1581, Gyllenhielm accompanied her spouse to his command in Swedish Estonia. She was constantly pregnant during her marriage and died after giving birth to her second son Jacob at Reval in 1583.

== Issue ==
Pontus De la Gardie and Sofia Gyllenhielm had three children who all survived childhood:

1. Brita Pontusdotter De la Gardie (1581–1645)
2. Baron Johan De la Gardie (1582–1642), statesman of the Swedish Empire
3. Count and Field Marshal Jacob De la Gardie (1583–1652)

== Sources ==
- Ericson Wolke, Lars, Johan III: en biografi, Historiska media, Lund, 2004
- Larsson, Lars-Olof, Arvet efter Gustav Vasa: berättelsen om fyra kungar och ett rike, Prisma, Stockholm, 2005
