= Jean de la Vallée =

Swedish architect (c. 1620–1696)

Jean de la Vallée (c. 1620 – 12 March 1696) was a Swedish architect.

== Biography ==
Born in France, he was the son of architect Simon de la Vallée (c. 1595–1642). He made early trips in France and Italy where he studied the new baroque forms of architecture. In 1637, he came to Sweden with his father Simon who was killed by a Swedish nobleman in 1642. The father had started the planning of the House of Knights in Stockholm, and in 1660 his son finished his father's work. Prior to this, Jean de la Vallée had planned two major churches in central Stockholm, Katarina kyrka in 1656 and Hedvig Eleonora Church in 1658.

In 1646, he received a royal scholarship for three years and began an international trip to study architecture. The journey went over the Netherlands to Paris where he arrived in August 1646. It continued to Italy and Rome, which he first left in the spring of 1650.

He also worked on the commission of many noblemen. For Magnus Gabriel de la Gardie he planned the remodeling of the Karlberg Castle in the capital. Other notable examples of his work are the castle of Skokloster, the Palace of Bonde (now the seat of the Supreme Court) and the remodeling of the Wrangel Palace (now the seat of Svea Hovrätt, the Svea Court of Appeal), both on Riddarholmen in central Stockholm.

In 1680 he was awarded the title "Royal and City Architect" and from 1680 to 1688 he was a state architect in Stockholm. In 1692 he was knighted.

== Personal life ==
In November 1654, he married Anna Maria Böös. His daughter, Margaret de la Vallée, was married to architect and master builder Mathias Spieler (c. 1640–1691). He died in Stockholm during 1696.
