= Koenigsmark =

Koenigsmark, Königsmark, Koenigsmarck, or Königsmarck may refer to:

- Königsmark, Saxony-Anhalt, Germany
- Koenigsmark (novel), a 1918 novel by Pierre Benoit
- Koenigsmark (1923 film), a film by Léonce Perret
- Koenigsmark (1935 film), a British film
- Koenigsmark (1953 film), a film starring Jean-Pierre Aumont
- Koenigsmark (1968 film), a French television film starring Hans Meyer

== People ==
- Hans Christoff von Königsmarck (1605–1663), German-Swedish soldier
- Kurt Christoph von Königsmarck (1634–1673), Dutch-Swedisch military leader
- Beata Elisabet von Königsmarck (1637–1723), Swedish landowner
- Otto Wilhelm Königsmarck (1639–1688), German-Swedish general
- Karl Johann von Königsmarck (1659–1686), Swedish count
- Maria Aurora von Königsmarck (1662–1728), Swedish noblewoman, mistress of Augustus the Strong
- Amalia von Königsmarck (1663–1740), Swedish artist
- Philip Christoph von Königsmarck (1665–1694), Swedish soldier
- Otto von Königsmarck (1815-1889), Prussian politician
- Will Koenigsmark (1896–1972), American baseball player
