= Pontus De la Gardie (disambiguation) =

Pontus De la Gardie is the name of:

- Pontus De la Gardie (c. 1520 – 1585), French nobleman and general in the service of Denmark and Sweden
- Pontus Fredrik De la Gardie (1630-1692), husband of Beata Elisabet von Königsmarck, son of Magnus Gabriel De la Gardie
- Pontus Fredrik De la Gardie (1726–1791), Swedish nobleman and military officer
