= Johanna Eleonora De la Gardie =

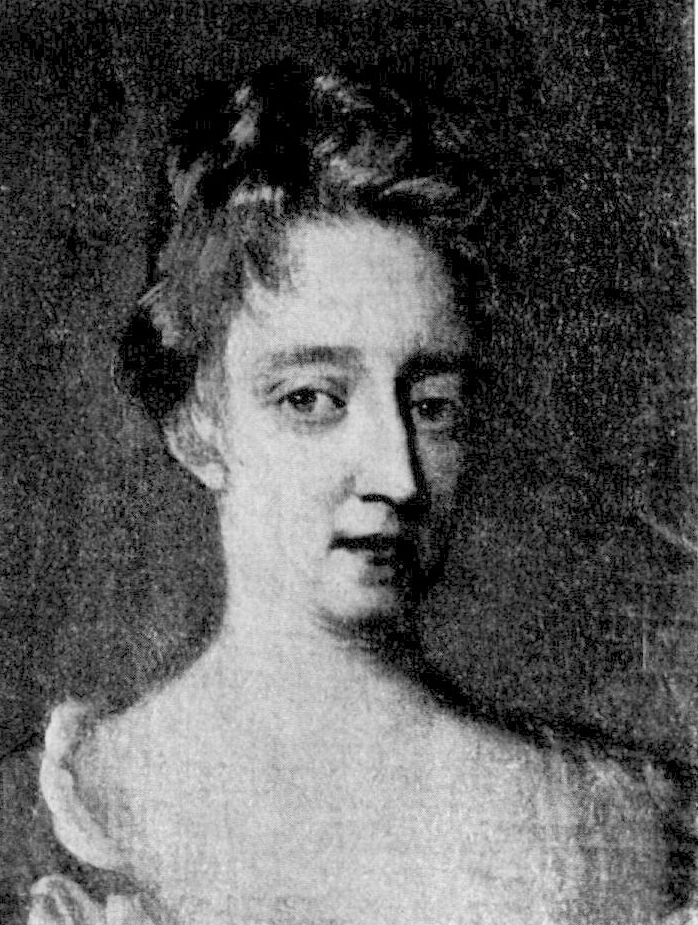
Johanna Eleonora De la Gardie

Johanna Eleonora Stenbock (née De la Gardie) (26 June 1661 in Hamburg – 27 December 1708 in Stockholm) was a Swedish writer, poet, lady-in-waiting and noblewoman.

== Biography ==
Johanna was the younger surviving daughter of Pontus Fredrik De la Gardie and Beata Elisabet von Königsmarck. She received a cultivated education along with her sister Ebba Maria De la Gardie and her cousins Amalia Wilhelmina von Königsmarck and Maria Aurora von Königsmarck; her sister became a respected poet and singer at court. Johanna became a lady-in-waiting and, with her sister, a favourite of Queen Ulrika Eleonora of Denmark. She was also a friend of the queen dowager, Hedwig Eleonora of Holstein-Gottorp.

Johanna participated at the amateur theatre of the royal court, encouraged by Queen Eleanora. In the winter of 1683–84, a group of female courtiers performed the Swedish premier of Iphigénie by Jean Racine at court. In the play, Johanna Eleonora De la Gardie acted the part of Iphigénie, Amalia Königsmarck the part of Achilles, Aurora Königsmarck the part of Clitemnestre, Augusta Wrangel the part of Agamemnon, and Ebba Maria De la Gardie the part of Eriphile. This is regarded as a significant event, as it was the first play performed by an all-female cast in Sweden and symbolized the introduction of French classicism to the country.

She wrote the French poem Portrait d’Ismène for Ulrika Eleonora as well as the German-language psalm Weich, Falsche Welt. She encouraged poets and writers; she is remembered as a benefactor and teacher of the poet and politician Samuel Triewald.

In 1691, Johanna married her cousin, Count Erik Gustaf Stenbock. They had seven children in just ten years, five of whom lived to adulthood:

- Ulrika Eleonora Stenbock (1692 – 1712)
- Beata Elisabet Stenbock (1693 – 1765)
- Gustaf Otto Stenbock (1694 – 1719)
- Christina Fredrika Stenbock (1696 – 1707), died in childhood
- Charlotta Magdalena Stenbock (1697 – 1707), died in childhood
- Hedvig Christina Stenbock (1699 – 1759)
- Fredrika Wilhelmina Stenbock (1701 – 1723)

As her husband took service in the English army, Johanna Eleonora spent many years living in London, and several of her children were born there. During her time in London, Johanna became popular at the English court of Queen Mary II.

The last years of Johanna's life were marked by illness, as she suffered from heavy coughing, fainting, and fevers. She finally succumbed in 1708, aged just 47, and was buried in the Jacob church in Stockholm.
