= Ulrika of Sweden =

Ulrika of Sweden may refer to:

- Ulrika Eleonora of Denmark or Ulrica Eleanor, Queen consort of Sweden 1680
- Ulrika Eleonora of Sweden or Ulrica Eleanor, Queen regnant of Sweden 1718
- Louisa Ulrika of Prussia or Louise Ulrica, Queen consort of Sweden 1751
