= Ulrika Eleonora of Denmark =

Queen of Sweden from 1680 to 1693

Ulrika Eleonora
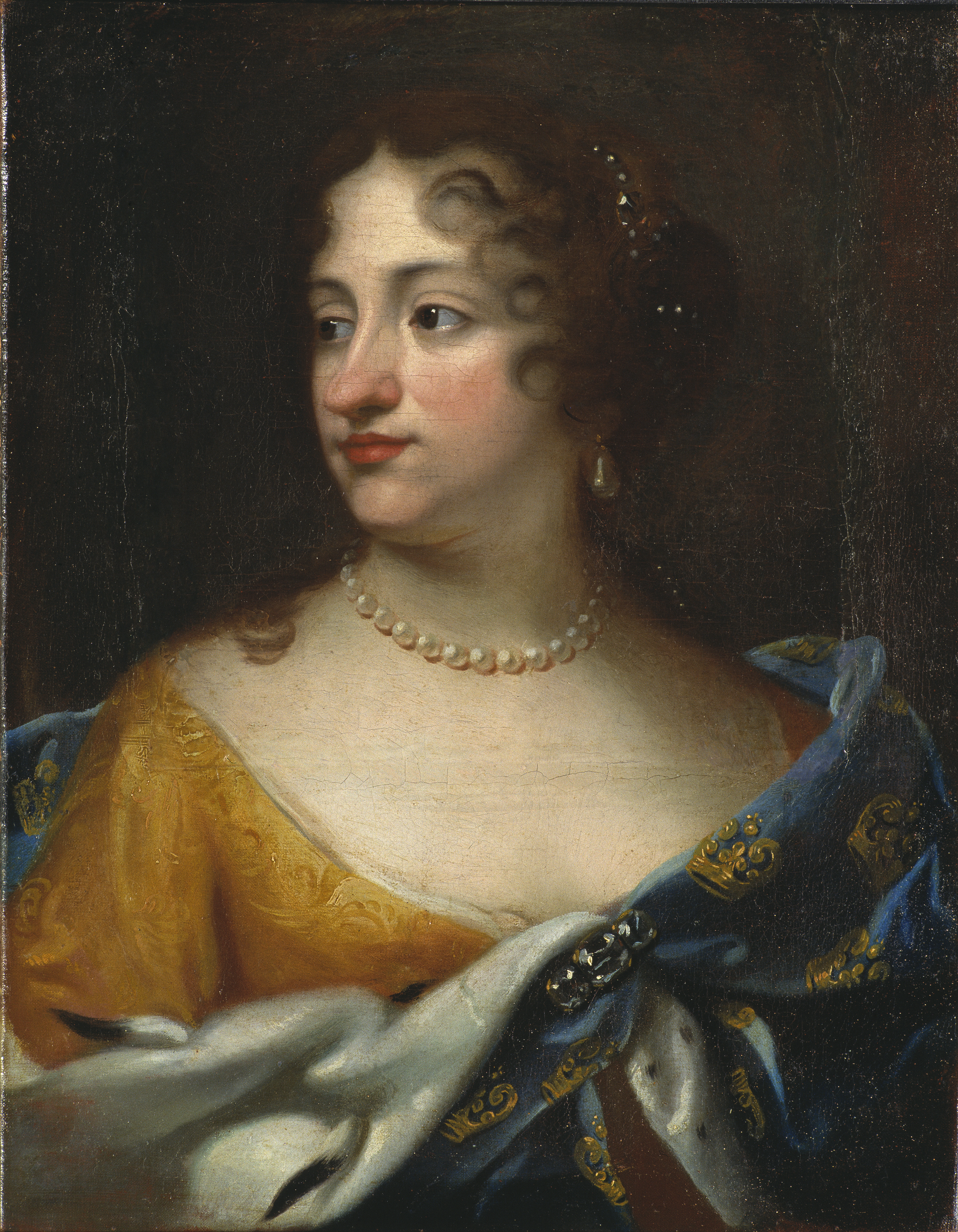
- Portrait attributed to Jacques d'Agar, 1677

Queen consort of Sweden
- Tenure: 6 May 1680 – 26 July 1693
- Coronation: 25 November 1680
- Born: 11 September 1656; Copenhagen, Denmark
- Died: 26 July 1693 (aged 36); Karlberg Palace, Solna, Sweden
- Spouse: Charles XI of Sweden (m. 1680)
- Issue Among others...: Hedvig Sophia, Duchess of Holstein-Gottorp; Charles XII, King of Sweden; Ulrika Eleonora, Queen of Sweden
- House: Oldenburg
- Father: Frederick III of Denmark
- Mother: Sophie Amalie of Brunswick-Lüneburg

Ulrika Eleonora of Denmark (11 September 1656 – 26 July 1693) was Queen of Sweden as the wife of King Charles XI. She is often admired for her generosity and charity.

The name Ulrike is a Danish version of the name; in Swedish she is called Ulrika Eleonora den äldre (English: Ulrica Eleanor the Elder), to distinguish her from her daughter, the future queen regnant.

== Life ==
=== Early life and marriage ===
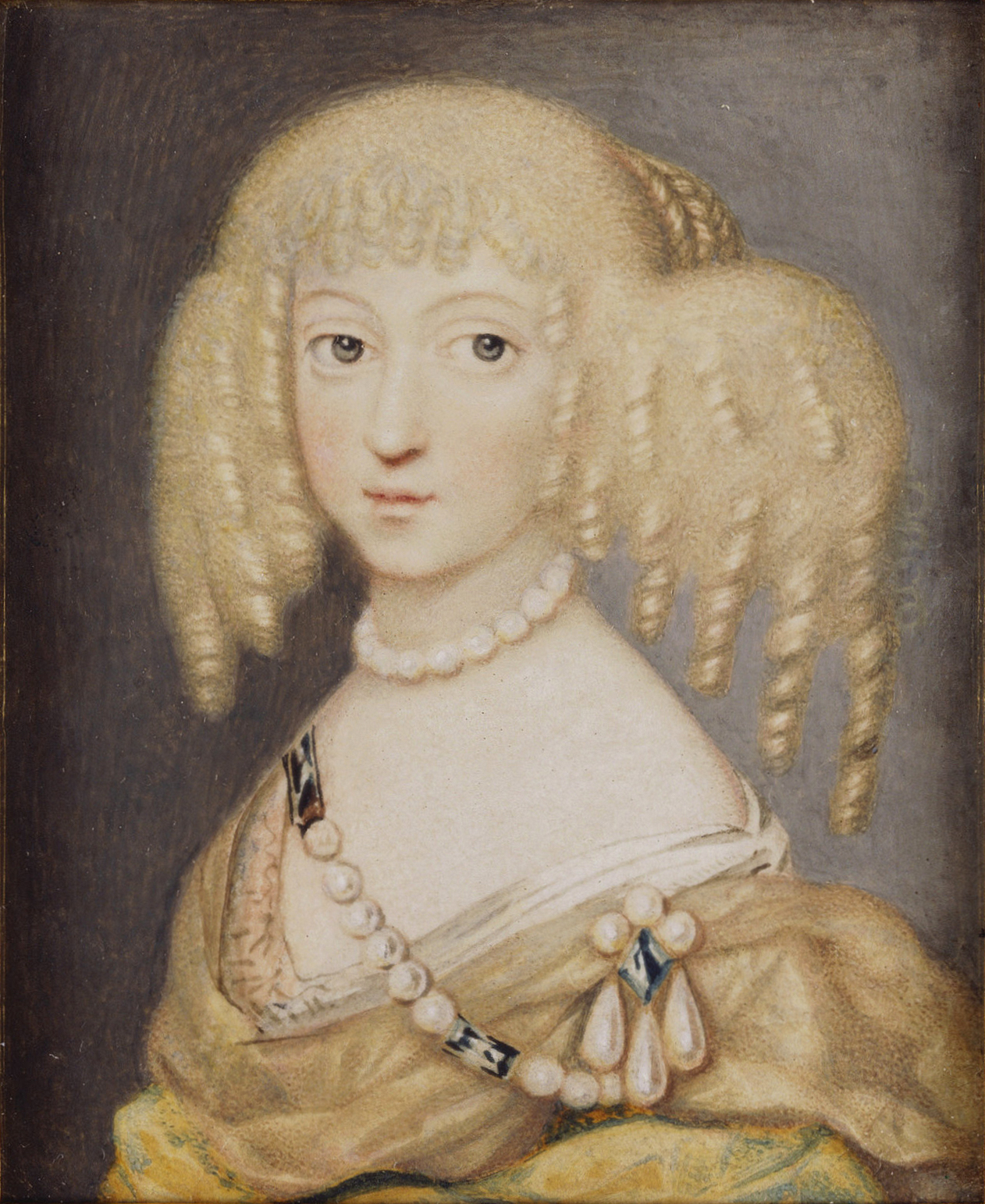
Ulrika Eleonora in her youth. portrayed by Pierre Signac

Ulrika Eleonora was the daughter of King Frederick III of Denmark–Norway and his spouse, Queen Sophie Amalie of Brunswick-Lüneburg. She was given a strict upbringing under the supervision of her mother: she was taught several different languages, and was reportedly a good student in drawing and painting.

In 1675 she was betrothed to King Charles XI of Sweden. The purpose of the match, though from the Swedish viewpoint, was to prevent Denmark from forming an alliance with the enemies of Sweden. Her brother, the King of Denmark–Norway, was not enthusiastic about the match, but he left the decision to her mother, who was very eager to complete it because it would give Ulrika the status of queen. The engagement was announced 13 July 1675.

During the Scanian War between Denmark–Norway and Sweden in 1675–1679 she was encouraged to break the engagement. Her brother broke it for her in 1676, but she herself continued to regard herself engaged. She was considered as a possible bride by the Prince of Orange in 1676 and then by Leopold I, Holy Roman Emperor, but she refused a different match. During the war, she gained a reputation for loyalty to her future home country by exhibiting kindness to Swedish prisoners: she pawned her jewelry and her engagement ring to buy food, ose, and medicine for the Swedish prisoners of war. She also refused to participate in the celebrations arranged in honor of Danish victories over Sweden.

During the peace negotiations between Sweden and Denmark–Norway in 1679, the marriage between her and Charles XI was again on the agenda, and was ratified on 26 September 1679. The marriage contract was signed 6 February 1680, and when the Swedish representative Johan Göransson Gyllenstierna returned to Sweden, he escorted her to Sweden on his return home. During one of the celebrations in honor of her marriage, her name and the name of her groom were written with fireworks. One of the spectators pointed out that the person whose name died out first was the one who was going to die first. When her name went out first, she stated that she hoped it would truly be so, for she could not bear to outlive her spouse.

Ulrika Eleonora was popular in Denmark due to her charity. When she left for Sweden, her brother Christian V made his farewell at Frederiksborg, during which he gave her back the jewels she had pawned in favor of the Swedish prisoners of war, including her engagement ring. When she made her farewell to him, she said that she did not think she would ever see him again, but: "as I am now regarded a pawn of peace between Denmark and Sweden, I ask God for the grace to fulfill such a glorious commitment; so that my behavior may contribute to eradicate all hostility between these two people and instead forever unite them in friendship."

In Helsingør, where she said her farewell to her mother and sisters, she thanked the Danes for their farewell greetings with the words:

"Thank you! By my heart I thank you! May I ever be remembered in Denmark with the same tenderness, and may God give me the grace to live such, that I by the last separation [death] can be followed by the same love from my subjects!"

=== Life as queen ===
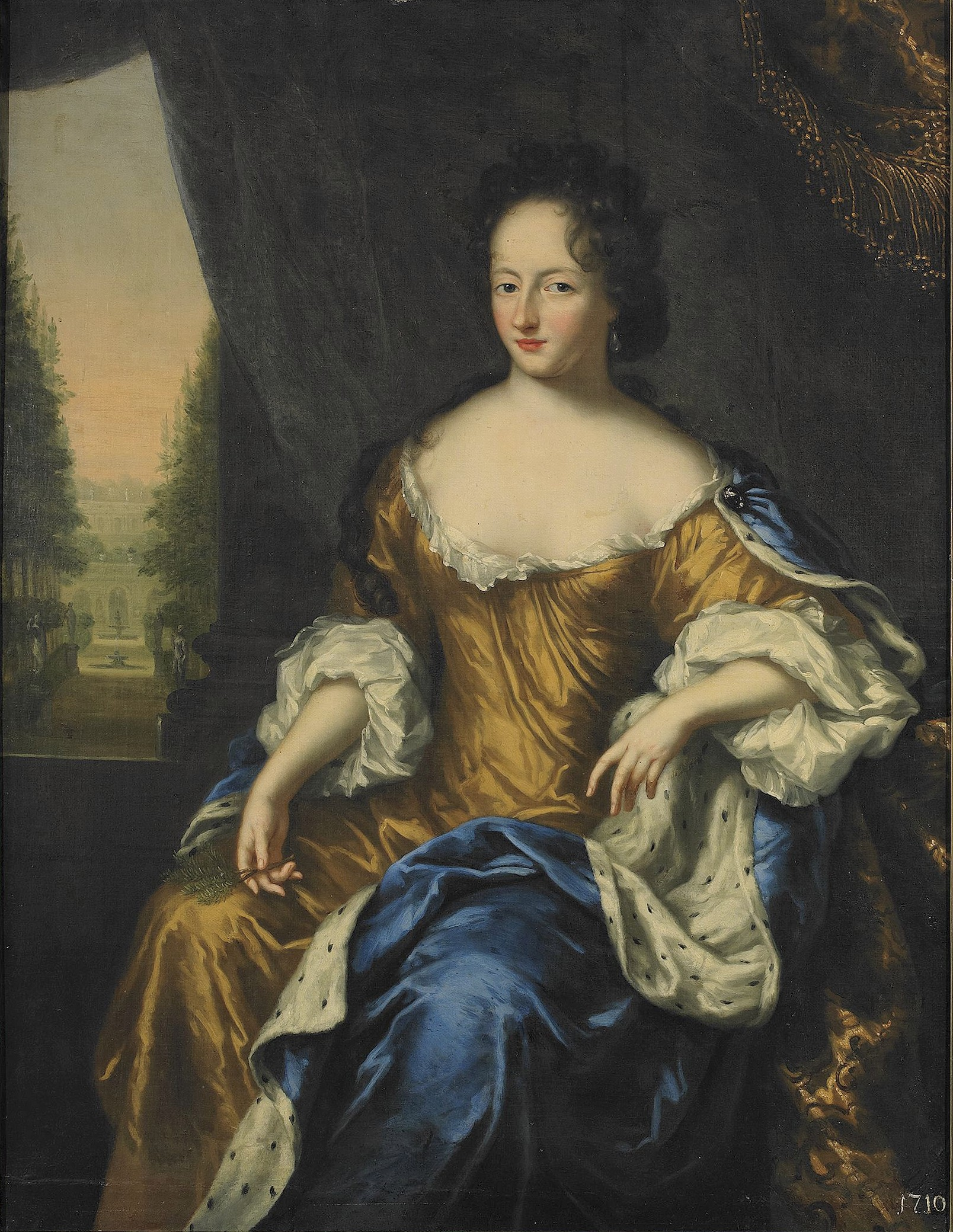
Ulrika Eleonora, by David Klöcker Ehrenstrahl 1686

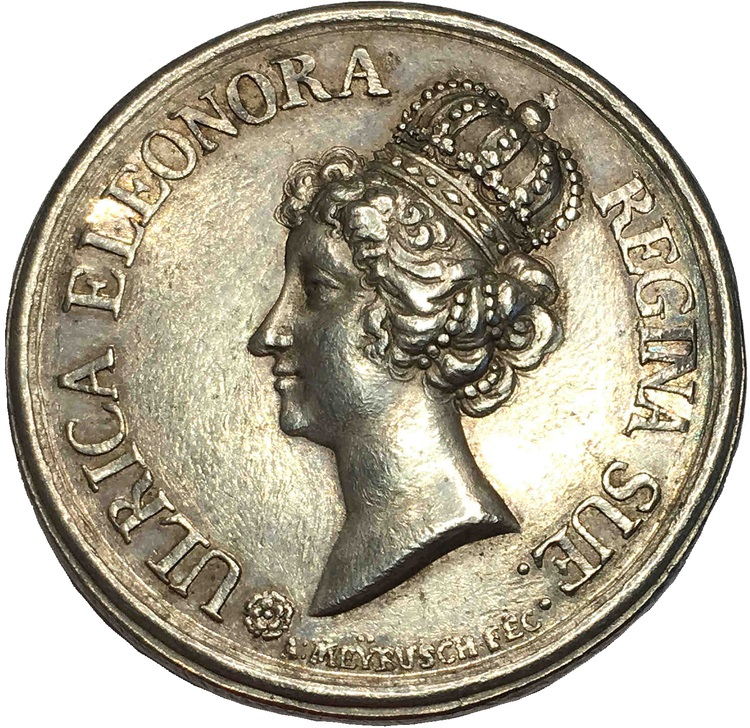
The queen's coronation medal 1680

Ulrika Eleonora arrived in Helsingborg in Sweden on 4 May 1680, where she was welcomed by canon salutation, the Queen Dowager, the Swedish court and the local aristocracy. Two days later she met and married Charles at Skottorp Manor on 6 May 1680. The wedding was hasty and a relatively simple affair in the presence of a small circle of courtiers. The reasoning for this was that the King, who was at that time in a tense relationship with France, wished to avoid the presence of the French ambassador Feuqiéres, and could do so only if the time and place of the ceremony could be kept secret long enough for it to be impossible for the ambassador to attend. The ceremony was to officially take place in Halmstad, and Ulrika Eleonora was only to spend the night at Skottorp on her way there, but when she arrived she was hastily married instead. On 25 November 1680 she was crowned Queen at Storkyrkan in Stockholm.

Initially, Charles XI was disappointed in her appearance and asked Johan Gyllenstierna if he could not have been chosen a more beautiful consort, upon which he was given the reply: "Your Majesty will see, that within her there is an angel". Ulrika Eleonora was described as religious, patient, mild and charitable, moderately beautiful and with a simple dignity. She was received with enthusiasm among the public, because she was seen as a hope and a symbol of lasting peace. Her popularity was increased by her personal merits.

She made a favorable impression of courage before her arrival to Stockholm, when spent some time in the royal residences outside of the city awaiting her official enter in the capital and the coronation. Traveling on Mälaren between Köping and Kungsör, the boat Carolus hit a rock and almost sunk. On this occasion, she calmed the panic by saying: "Be still, do not cry out so! If we shall die, it will be the will of God, and God's will be done!"

Ulrika Eleonora also quickly made herself popular by immediately dispatching almost her entire Danish entourage back to Denmark, stating that she no longer needed anything from Denmark and that her spouse and his ministers would provide for her. Charles XI had provided her with her own court and a large allowance from her dower estates. The Danish ambassador Jens Juel, who had been sent to secure her personal interests, protested against her insistence to refuse anything which could be to her advantage. She did accept being given her own court, though she commented that she would have been happy to merely share the household of the King, but she herself took the initiative of giving up the right to control her own economy, and giving up the administration of her dower to the officials of the monarch. When Juel protested that she went much too far in her eagerness to show herself submissive, and that she was giving away her own right to independence, she answered: "As I wish for nothing else than what is right and proper, the King and his officials would never be able to refuse what I ask of them without damaging their own name. Furthermore I hope that this indulgence of mine would ease the further negotiations with Denmark", and to this Juel could not protest.

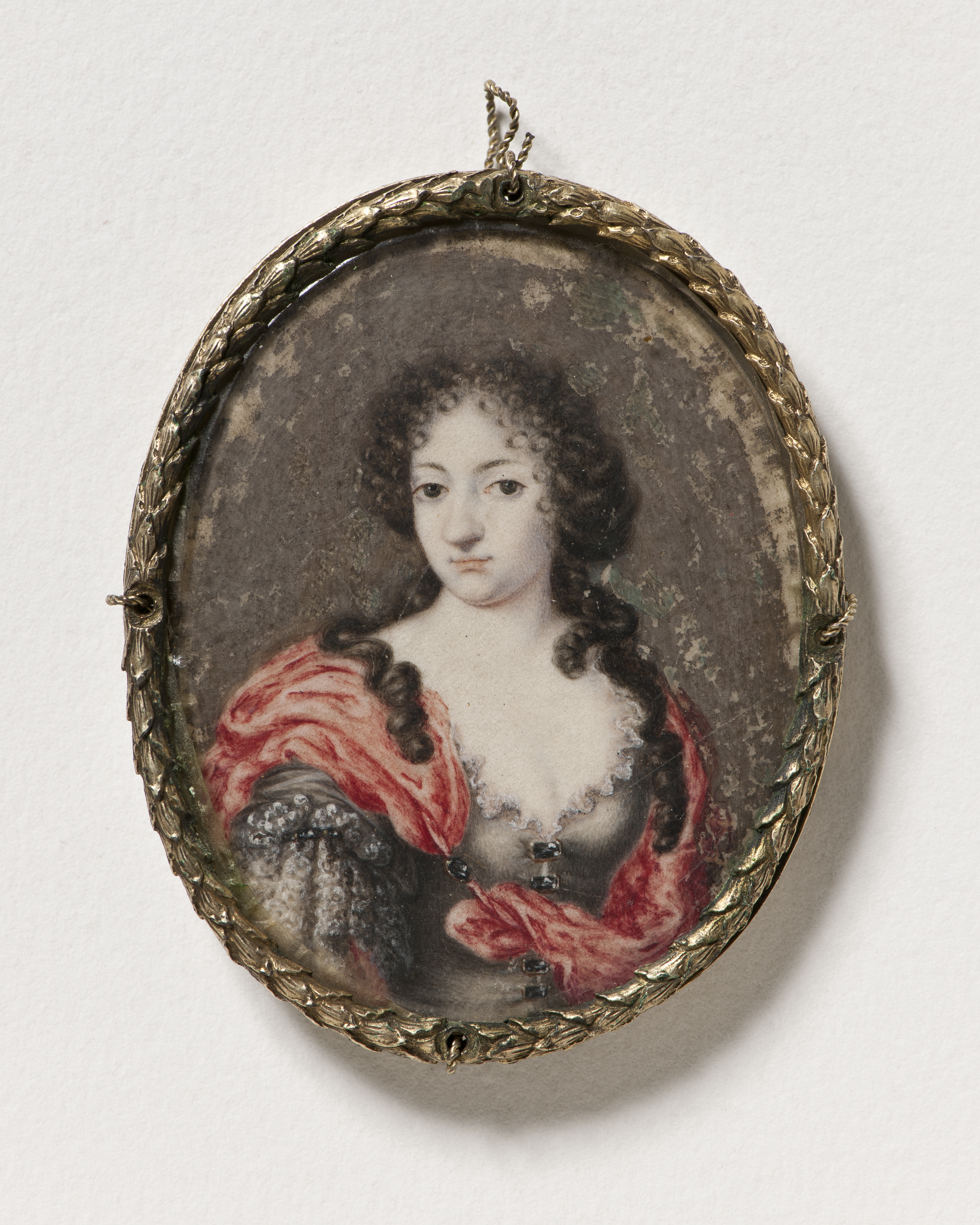
Self portrait of and by the queen herself

At the royal court, Ulrika Eleonora was placed in the shadow of her mother-in-law. While distrust between Denmark–Norway and Sweden caused by the Scanian War lingered, Hedvig Eleonora and the government of Sweden were not receptive to the son's idea to marry a Danish princess. Though his marriage was described as happy, Charles XI continued to place his mother before his wife. The mother-in-law of Ulrika Eleonora never quite surrendered the position of queen to her daughter-in-law. Upon the arrival of Ulrika Eleonora in Helsingborg, her mother-in-law offered her the most prominent place in the carriage on their departure from the harbor, but Ulrika Eleonora had instead insisted upon taking the most humble place. After this, her mother-in-law continued to monopolize the foremost place in rank at all occasions, such as placing herself by the side of King Charles XI at the table and receptions, and walking by his side in procession, leaving the second best place to Ulrika Eleonora. The King himself, being accustomed always to treat his mother with obedience and respect, adjusted himself to this. The King always referred to Ulrika Eleonora as "My Wife" and to his mother as "The Queen"; he paid his respect to his mother first and to his wife secondly. Mindful of this, the foreign ambassadors always visited Hedvig Eleonora first, and then Ulrika Eleonora when paying their respects to the royal family. This was nurtured by the circles at court who favored the alliance between Sweden and Holstein-Gottorp against Denmark–Norway, and pointed to the fact that in Denmark, the mother of Ulrika Eleonora, also placed herself before that of her daughter-in-law, and also that Hedvig Eleonora was not only Queen Dowager but also formerly regent.

This created some tension between her and her mother-in-law, but there was never an open conflict. However, in July 1686, Ulrika Eleonora left Stockholm when Charles XI was visiting the country, and took upon residence at the Uppsala Castle in Uppsala with the royal children and her own court, stating that she would be there not only for the summer. The reason was in fact to have been her displeasure over the relationship between her husband and mother-in-law. Meanwhile, her husband traveled around the country with his mother. In August, they visited her and unsuccessfully tried to convince her to return to Stockholm. After a visit by her mother-in-law alone in September, she finally returned. Later that year, she contacted the bishop Samuel Wiraenius and asked him to act as a mediator, and to make the King state officially what mistakes she could have made. Nothing more is known about this conflict, however, Ulrika Eleonora did accept that the rank of her mother-in-law was placed before her, but stated that she disliked that this meant that also her courtiers were ranked beneath those of her mother-in-law. Her private family life with her spouse and children were described as happy: her consort was never unfaithful to her. Upon his own deathbed in 1697, he told his mother that he had not been happy since his wife died. During her lifetime, Ulrika Eleonora never developed good terms with her mother-in-law, whom she once referred to as "The Devil of my marriage".

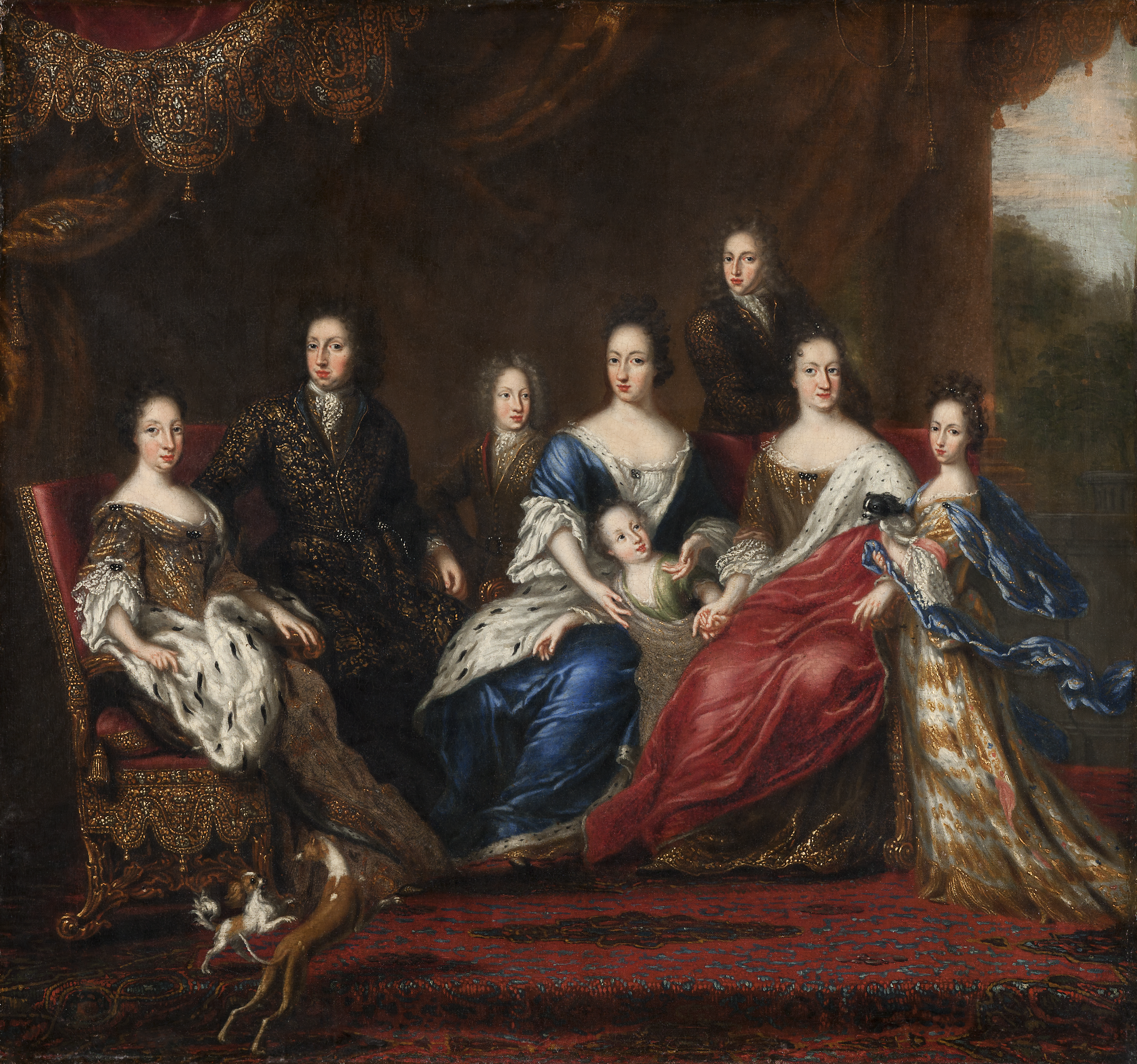
Ulrika Eleonora's family in the 1690s

Her frail health and her many pregnancies often prevented her from participating in representation. In 1688, she had plans to visit her family in Denmark, but her weak health forced her to abandon the idea. At the summer residence Karlberg Palace, she enjoyed a happy family life away from the court and developed an interest in painting. She was interested in theater and dance and acted as patron of the amateur theatre at court. In the winter of 1683–84, a group of female courtiers performed the Swedish premier of Iphigénie by Racine at court upon her request. In the play, Johanna Eleonora De la Gardie acted in the part of Iphigenie, Amalia Königsmarck as Achilles, Aurora Königsmarck as Clitemnestre, Augusta Wrangel as Agamemnon, and Ebba Maria De la Gardie as Eriphile. This is regarded as a significant event as the first play performed by an all female cast in Sweden, and as the introduction of French Classicism in Sweden. Apparently, Ulrika Eleonora herself had originally wished to participate, but her pregnancy at the time had made it impossible. Her personal circle of intimate friends are counted as her personal confessor Johan Carlberg, her Mistress of the Robes countess Maria Elisabeth Stenbock, her Danish lady-in-waiting Sophia Amalia Marschalk and Anna Maria Clodt. She also enjoined the visits of her brother-in-law and sister the duke and duchess of Holstein-Gottorp.

Ulrika Eleonora had no political influence over Charles XI, who preferred to discuss the affairs of state with his mother rather than with his spouse. She once tried to exercise some political influence over Charles XI. During the Great Reduction to the crown of counties, baronies and large lordships from the nobility (most of them richly given away by Queen Christina), she tried to speak on the behalf of the people whose property was confiscated by the crown. But the king simply told her that the reason he had married her was not because he wanted her political advice. Instead, she helped people whose property had been confiscated by secretly compensating them economically from her own budget. A common method she used was to buy the jewels and other objects sold by the impoverished nobles, and then give it back to them or their relatives. Charles XI's confidence in her grew over time: in 1690, he named her future Regent, should his son succeed him being still a minor.

Ulrika Eleonora is most known for her great activity within charity. She founded a large number of charitable institutions, which were administered by Sophia Amalia Marschalk. Ulrika Eleonora is known to occasionally have pawned her own possessions to finance her charitable projects. Her best known projects were the Tapetskolan vid Karlberg, a tapestry school at Karlberg Palace founded in 1688, where orphan girls were educated in tapestry manufacturing by three unmarried Finnish noblewomen under the leadership of Anna Maria Schmilau; the Drottninghuset ('Queen's House'), a home for poor widows in Stockholm founded in 1686, and a poor house at Kungsholmen. She financed cereal and help to be distributed to areas suffering from failed crops and starvation, such as Finland in 1687, Estonia in 1688, Dalarna in 1691, and Ingria. She also paid the medical bills for a large number of people in Stockholm. In 1682, she assigned Johan von Hoorn and Urban Hjärne to organize the midwifery and scientific obstetrics profession in Sweden, but she died before the work could be completed: however, Johan von Hoorn did publish the first book on the subject of obstetrics in 1697 assisted by her own midwife, Catarina Wentin, who also practiced among the poor of the capital with her blessing. She supported a large number of people by regular allowances from her personal budget, such as invalid soldiers and their spouses and converts to Protestantism from Judaism, Islam and Catholicism, especially female converts. Among them were also French Huguenots. In 1693, 17,000 people were supported by her.

=== Death ===
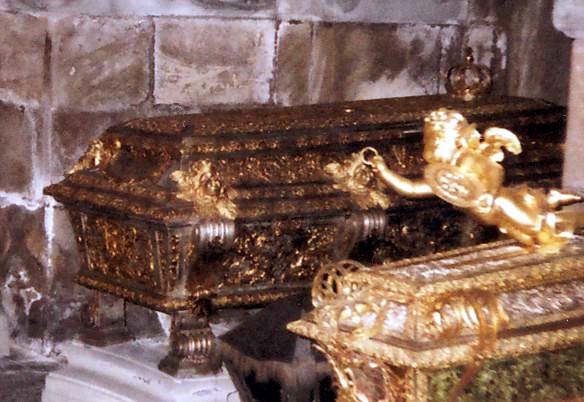
Ulrica Eleanor's coffin in Riddarholm Church

In 1690, weakened by childbirths, Ulrika Eleonora was affected by a non-diagnosed illness, which was deemed to be mortal and often confined her to weeks in bed from this point on. The doctors recommended her to travel to the hot baths in Germany. Funds were set aside for this purpose, but she stated that she was as much in God's hand in Sweden as in Germany, and used the money for her charity instead. The King cared for Ulrika Eleonora personally at Karlsberg Palace as far as his duties permitted.

She died at Karlberg Palace 26 July 1693, after having spent the winter of 1692–93 in bed. Upon her death bed, she asked her children not to be haughty but to consider their high position as a way of helping others; to avoid flattery and pride; never to listen to gossip and, should they hear it, call upon the slandered party, listen to their explanation and regard it to be the truth. She asked her spouse to show mercy to the victims of the reduction: upon her deathbed, she recounted the names of many of the individual victims of the reduction for him, and asked for him to show mercy, each time ending the sentence with the words: "You will promise me thus?" She also asked for a simple funeral, and to give the funds set aside for it to the poor. At her deathbed, Charles XI reportedly said: "Here I leave half of my heart".

At her death, Countess De la Gardie remarked: "I do not believe any royal to have been so mourned as Her Majesty. Here there are unanimous crying and wimping, and everyone dresses in mourning, so that in the entire city, there are no more black cloth to be bought". Ulrika Eleonora has in history been given a saintly reputation, exemplified by the words of Frans Ferdinand Carlson: "Seldom has a more lovable creature been placed upon a throne. She thought of everyone but herself". After her death the King took ill with a fever and it took almost two weeks before he was amongst the people again.

There is a well known old legend associated with her death. The legend states that while the queen lay dying at Karlberg Palace, her favorite and principal lady-in-waiting, Countess Maria Elisabeth Stenbock, lay sick in Stockholm. On the night the queen had died, Countess Stenbock visited Karlberg and was admitted alone to the room containing the remains of the queen. The officer in charge, Captain Stormcrantz, looked into the key hole and saw the countess and the queen speaking at the window of the room. He was so shocked by the sight that he started coughing blood. The countess, as well as the carriage she had arrived with, was gone the next moment. When the matter was investigated, it was made clear that the countess had been in bed, gravely ill that day and not left town. The King gave the order that the affair was not to be mentioned further. Whatever the explanation, it is true that countess Stenbock died of her illness a couple of weeks after the queen, and that captain Stormcrantz also did so shortly after the event he claimed took place.

Charles XI did not respect her wish of a simple funeral. However, he paid the equal amount of its costs to the poor. He announced for two years of mourning for the royal court, and when the period was finished in 1695, he refused to marry despite pressure to do so.

Her body was kept on Lit de parade in Karlsberg Palace for several months by the King until she was buried in the fall of 1693 in Riddarholm Church.

== Issue ==
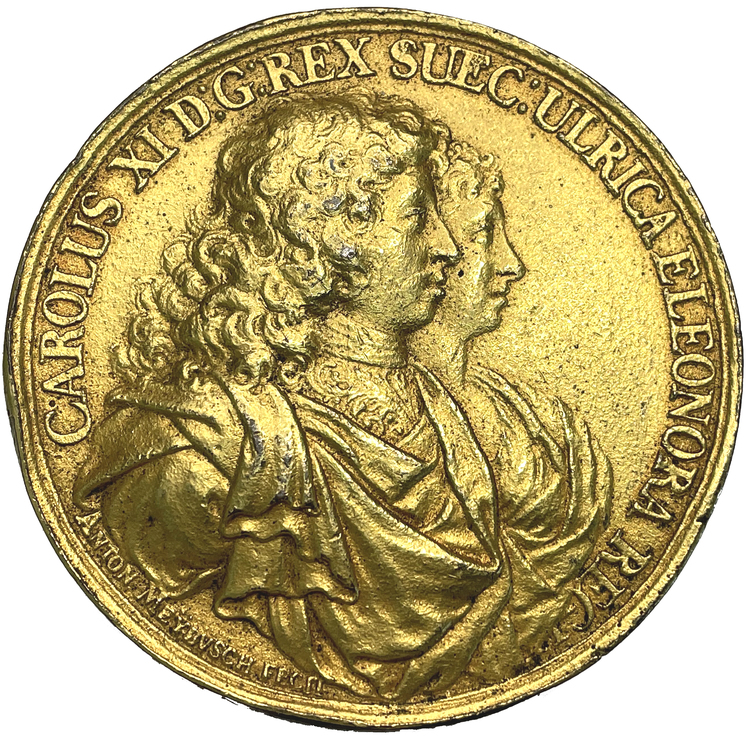
Wedding medal 1680

- Hedwig Sophia Augusta (26 June 1681 – 22 December 1708); married on 12 May 1698 to Frederick IV, Duke of Holstein-Gottorp.
- Charles (17 June 1682 – 30 November 1718); died aged 36, unmarried without issue.
- Gustav (14 June 1683 – 26 April 1685); died in childhood.
- Ulric (2 August 1684 – 8 June 1685); died in infancy.
- Frederick (7 October 1685 – 22 October 1685); died in infancy.
- Charles Gustav (27 December 1686 – 13 February 1687); died in infancy.
- Ulrika Eleonora (23 January 1688 – 24 November 1741); married on 24 March 1715 to Prince Frederick of Hesse-Kassel. Died aged 53 without issue.

== Ancestry ==
Ancestors of Ulrika Eleonora of Denmark

8. Frederick II of Denmark
4. Christian IV of Denmark
9. Sophie of Mecklenburg-Schwerin
2. Frederick III of Denmark
10. Joachim Frederick, Elector of Brandenburg
5. Anne Catherine of Brandenburg
11. Catherine of Brandenburg-Küstrin
1. Ulrika Eleonora of Denmark
12. William, Duke of Brunswick-Lüneburg
6. George, Duke of Brunswick-Lüneburg
13. Dorothea of Denmark
3. Sophie Amalie of Brunswick-Lüneburg
14. Louis V, Landgrave of Hesse-Darmstadt
7. Anne Eleonore of Hesse-Darmstadt
15. Magdalene of Brandenburg

Ulrika Eleonora of Denmark House of Oldenburg Born: 11 September 1656 Died: 26 July 1693
Royal titles
Preceded by Hedvig Eleonora of Holstein-Gottorp	Queen consort of Sweden; 1680–1693	Succeeded by Frederick of Hesse-Kassel as prince consort
