= Ebba Maria De la Gardie =

Ebba Maria De la Gardie (28 March 1657 – 9 July 1697) was a Swedish poet and singer.

She was the elder surviving daughter of count Pontus Fredrik De la Gardie and Beata Elisabet von Königsmarck, the sister of Johanna Eleonora De la Gardie and the cousin of Amalia Wilhelmina Königsmarck and Maria Aurora Königsmarck. She was a favorite of the Swedish queen Ulrika Eleonora of Denmark. She was active as a poet at the royal court and was given much attention by her contemporaries.

She participated at the amateur theatre of the royal court encouraged by the queen, Ulrika Eleonora of Denmark. In the winter of 1683-84, a group of female courtiers performed the Swedish premier of Iphigénie by Racine at court. In the play, Johanna Eleonora De la Gardie acted in the part of Iphigenie, Amalia Königsmarck as Achilles, Aurora Königsmarck as Clitemnestre, Augusta Wrangel as Agamemnon, and Ebba Maria De la Gardie as Eriphile. This is regarded as a significant event, as it was the first play performed by an all-female cast in Sweden and symbolized the introduction of French classicism to the country.

Like her sister, Ebba Maria always had delicate lungs, frequently suffering from heavy coughing, fainting, and fevers. In July 1697, she finally succumbed and died, aged just 39.

== Sources ==
- https://web.archive.org/web/20071030135817/http://historiska-personer.nu/min-s/pd78bceec.html
- Samlade vitterhetsarbeten af svenska författare från Stjernhjelm ..., Volym 18
- De la Gardie, Ebba Maria i Wilhelmina Stålberg, Anteckningar om svenska qvinnor (1864)
- De la Gardie, Ebba Maria i Herman Hofberg, Svenskt biografiskt handlexikon (andra upplagan, 1906)
- Ebba Maria De la Gardie Svenskt biografiskt lexikon (SBL)
