= Otto Wilhelm Königsmarck =

German-Swedish noble and military officer (1639-1688)

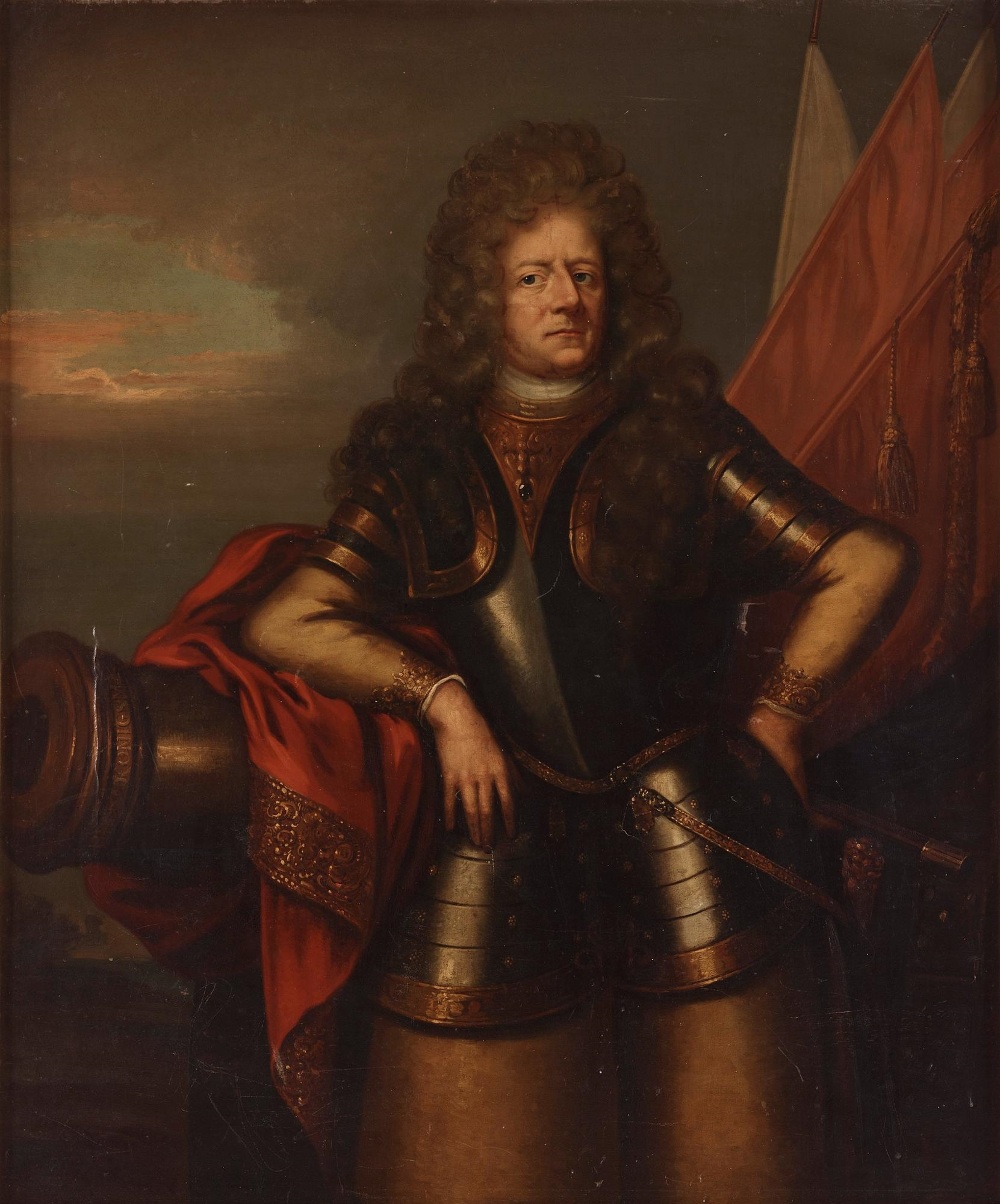
- Portrait of Count Otto von Wilhelm Königsmarck by David Klöcker Ehrenstrahl
- Born: 5 January 1639; Minden, Prince-Bishopric of Minden
- Died: 15 September 1688 (aged 49); Chalcis, Ottoman Empire
- Education: University of Jena
- Spouse: Catharina Charlotta De la Gardie
- Father: Hans Christoff von Königsmarck
- Military career
- Allegiance: (yes) Swedish Empire Republic of Venice
- Service years: 1664–1688
- Rank: Field Marshal
- Conflicts: See list: Scanian War; Battle of Warksow; Siege of Stralsund; Morean War; Siege of the Acropolis; Siege of Negroponte

Count Otto Wilhelm von Königsmarck (5 January 1639 – 15 September 1688) was a German nobleman from Minden, who served as a diplomat and general for various European states, most notably Sweden and Venice. He died of malaria on the Venetian flagship off the coast of Greece.

== Early life and education ==
Königsmarck was born in Minden, the son of Count Hans Christoff von Königsmarck and his wife, Agathe von Leesten (1608-1671). He was the brother of Count Conrad Christoff von Königsmarck and the uncle of Aurora von Königsmarck, Amalia Wilhelmina von Königsmarck, Philip Christoph von Königsmarck and Karl Johann von Königsmarck.

After his parents settled in Stade in 1645, his mother ensured that her son had a good education. Initially, Königsmarck was probably taught by the scholar Johann Heinrich Tonsor, but Esaias von Pufendorf was his preceptor (private tutor). He studied at the University of Jena for over three years, where he became Rector magnificus. He then briefly visited the universities in Tübingen, Strasbourg, Basel, Geneva, Blois and Angers.

== Career ==
During his career, Königsmarck served as a diplomat and a general for various European states, including France, Sweden, Electoral Palatinate, the Holy Roman Empire, and Venice. In 1672, he became a Swedish major general; in 1674, a French major general and a Swedish lieutenant field marshal, and in 1675 a full Swedish field marshal. He commanded the Swedish forces at the Battle of Stralsund (1678) and was governor general for Swedish Pomerania from 1679 to 1687.

Königsmarck lost much of his land and wealth following the Great Reduction of 1680. He then turned his attention towards the Ottoman Empire, joining the forces of the Holy Roman Empire fighting in Hungary during the Great Turkish War. He then became the commander-in-chief of all the Venetian land forces, whilst Francesco Morosini commanded the naval forces, in what became known as the Morean War. In 1687, his forces had great success, including taking Patras, Corinth, and Athens. In Athens, the Ottomans retreated to the Acropolis, which Königsmarck besieged. On 26 September, a shot by the Venetian forces hit the Ottoman gunpowder storage in the Parthenon, causing tremendous damage.

Athens was abandoned in April 1688, as the plague was decimating the Venetian forces. The plague broke out again over the summer during the Siege of Negroponte and Königsmarck himself died of the plague on 15 September 1688, under the care of his wife. Venice put up a marble bust in honour of Königsmarck, it is now in the Arsenal. On 19 January 1691, he was buried in Stade, where he had grown up.

== Personal life ==
He was married to Countess Catharina Charlotta De la Gardie (1655-1697), the cousin of Charles XI and the daughter of Count Magnus Gabriel De la Gardie and his wife, Princess Maria Euphrosyne of Zweibrücken-Kleeburg. They had no children.

== Sources ==
- Setton, Kenneth Meyer (1991). Venice, Austria, and the Turks in the Seventeenth Century. Philadelphia: The American Philosophical Society. ISBN 0-87169-192-2.
