= Hans Christoff von Königsmarck =

Swedish politician and military commander (1600–1663)

Fältmarskalk Count Hans Christoff von Königsmarck
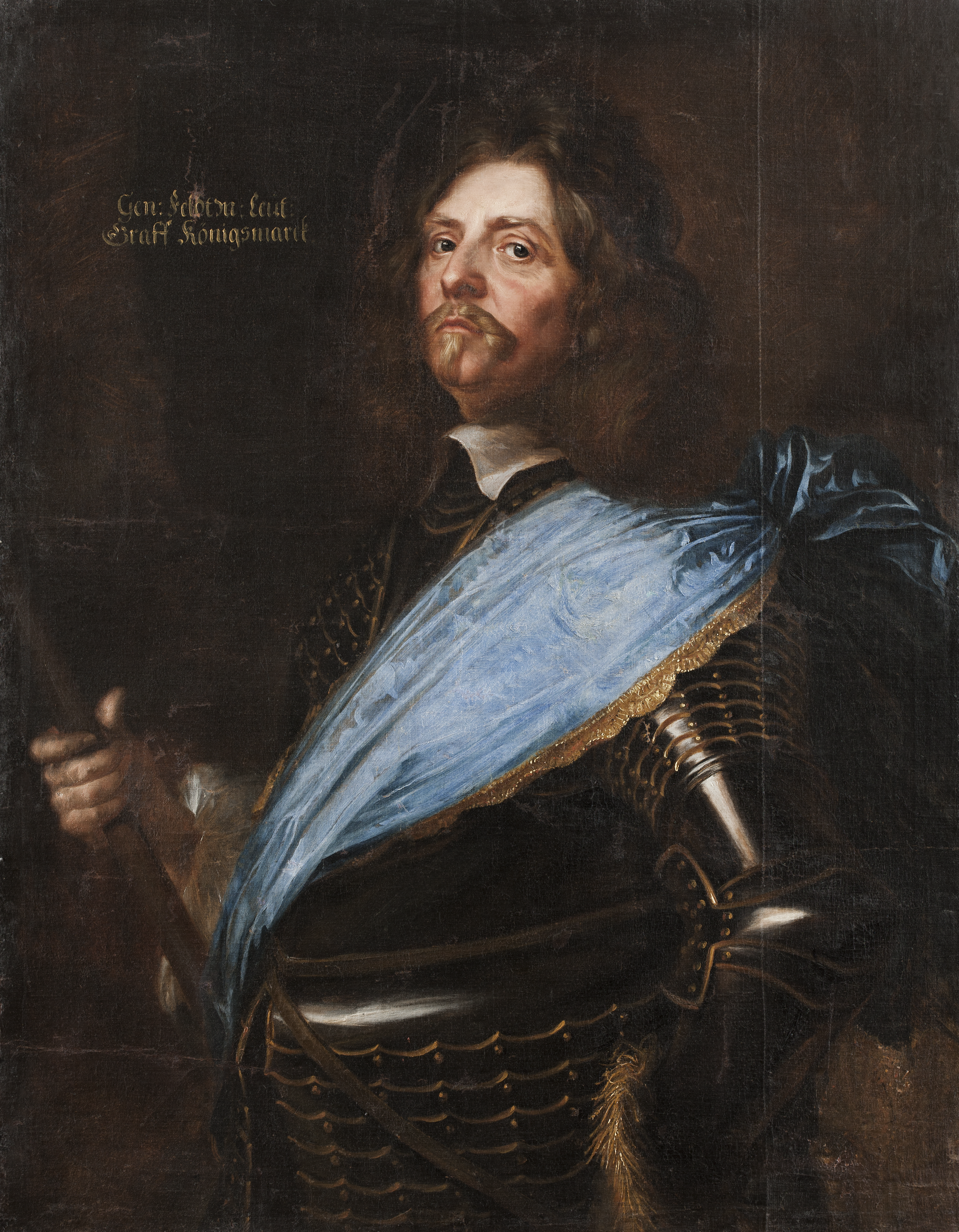
- Hans Christoff von Königsmarck by Matthaeus Merian the Younger
- Born: 12 December 1605; Kötzlin, Altmark, Brandenburg
- Died: 8 March 1663 (aged 57); Stockholm, Sweden
- Military career
- Allegiance: Holy Roman Empire (yes) Swedish Empire
- Rank: Field marshal
- Conflicts: Thirty Years' War; Blockade of Eger; Battle of Prague (1648); Second Northern War (POW)
- Other work: Governor-General of Bremen-Verden, Privy Councillor

Count Hans Christoff von Königsmarck, of Tjust (12 December 1605 – 8 March 1663) was a German soldier who commanded Sweden's legendary flying column, a force which played a key role in the Swedish military strategy in the Thirty Years' War.

== Early life ==
He was born in Kötzlin, Altmark as the son of Konrad von Königsmarck (1570-1620) and his wife, Beata Beatrix Elisabeth von Blumenthal (1580-1621).

== Biography ==
After serving as a page on the court of Prince Frederick Ulrich of Wolfenbüttel, he entered Imperial military service in 1620. After the dissolution of Albrecht von Wallenstein's troops and Gustavus Adolphus' intervention, Königsmarck offered his services to the Swedish King. By 1635 he commanded his own regiment. He was appointed Major General in 1640, Governor-General of Bremen-Verden in 1645, Privy Councilor in 1651 and Field Marshal in 1655. He is best known for the Battle of Prague between 25 June and 1 November 1648, where he managed to capture and loot the left-bank of Prague but failed to take the Old Town until fighting ended with news of the Peace of Westphalia.

During the Second Northern War, Königsmarck was captured on a sea passage to the Polish front by Danzigian ships and held prisoner at Weichselmünde until the Treaty of Oliva 1660.

In 1655 Königsmarck erected a castle in Lieth and named it after his wife Agathe von Leesten. The name of the castle, Agathenburg, also became the toponym of the village Lieth. Their children were:

- Otto Wilhelm von Königsmarck
- Conrad or Kurt Christoph von Königsmarck, whose children were:
  - Karl Johann von Königsmarck
  - Maria Aurora von Königsmarck.
  - Amalia Wilhelmina von Königsmarck
  - Philip Christoph von Königsmarck
- Beata Elisabet von Königsmarck

He died, aged 57, in Stockholm.
