= Catarina Wentin =

Swedish-German midwife

Catarina Wentin (1637–1707) was a Swedish (originally German) midwife, official midwife of the royal court. She has been referred to as the most well known midwife in Swedish history.

Wentin was called to Sweden from Germany to deliver the future king Charles XII of Sweden in 1682. On her own initiative, she was given a residence near the royal palace, the title Royal Midwife and a royal dispensation to perform her work in Stockholm under royal protection rather than under the supervision of the medical authorities. Supported by the queen, Ulrika Eleonora of Denmark, she was active also among the poor of the capital. Wentin had great knowledge in medicine and was respected within medical circles. Though she did not publish a book herself, Johan von Hoorn referred to her in his book about midwifery, Den svenska wäl-öfwande Jord-gumman from 1697.
