= Siege of Negroponte (1688) =

Battle during the Morean War

- Part of the Morean War
Date	13 July – 21 October 1688
Location	Chalkis (Negroponte), Ottoman Empire
Result	Ottoman victory

Belligerents
Republic of Venice	Ottoman Empire

Commanders and leaders
Francesco Morosini; Otto Wilhelm Königsmarck	Ismail Pasha

Strength
15,000 troops 10,000 in the fleet	6,000

Casualties and losses
Heavy losses, 4,000 from the plague	Unknown

The siege of Negroponte (modern Chalkis) was undertaken by the forces of the Republic of Venice from July to October 1688. The Venetian army, composed of several mercenary and allied contingents from western Europe, had succeeded in capturing the Peloponnese in the previous years, and proceeded to capture Athens and attack Negroponte, the main Ottoman stronghold in Central Greece. The Venetian siege was hampered by the Ottoman resistance and their inability to completely isolate the town, as the Ottoman general Ismail Pasha managed to ferry supplies to the besieged garrison. Furthermore, the Venetian army suffered many casualties from an outbreak of the plague in the Venetian camp, which led to the death of 4,000 troops and the experienced general Otto Wilhelm Königsmarck. The departure of the Florentine and Maltese contingents further weakened the Venetians, and when the German mercenaries refused to remain there in winter quarters, the Venetian commander, Doge Francesco Morosini, had to concede defeat and retreat to the Peloponnese.

== Sources ==
- Andrews, Kevin (2006). Castles of the Morea (Revised ed.). American School of Classical Studies at Athens. pp. 183–185. ISBN 0876614063.
- Chasiotis, Ioannis (1975). "Η κάμψη της Οθωμανικής δυνάμεως" [The decline of Ottoman power]. In Christopoulos, Georgios A. & Bastias, Ioannis K. (eds.). Ιστορία του Ελληνικού Έθνους [History of the Greek Nation] (in Greek). Vol. ΙΑ: Ο Ελληνισμός υπό ξένη κυριαρχία (περίοδος 1669 - 1821), Τουρκοκρατία - Λατινοκρατία [Hellenism under Foreign Rule (Period 1669 - 1821), Turkocracy – Latinocracy]. Athens: Ekdotiki Athinon. pp. 8–51. ISBN 978-960-213-100-8.
- Finlay, George (1856). The History of Greece under Othoman and Venetian Domination. London: William Blackwood and Sons. pp. 227–228.
- Setton, Kenneth Meyer (1991). Venice, Austria, and the Turks in the Seventeenth Century. Philadelphia, Pennsylvania: American Philosophical Society. pp. 347–362. ISBN 0-87169-192-2.
