= Saraband for Dead Lovers =

- Directed by: Basil Dearden
- Written by: John Dighton; Alexander Mackendrick
- Based on: novel by Helen Simpson
- Produced by: Michael Balcon; Michael Relph (associate producer)
- Starring: Stewart Granger; Joan Greenwood
- Cinematography: Douglas Slocombe
- Edited by: Michael Truman
- Music by: Alan Rawsthorne
- Production company: Ealing Studios
- Distributed by: General Film Distributors
- Release date: 4 October 1948 (general release)
- Running time: 96 minutes
- Country: United Kingdom
- Language: English
- Budget: £371,205
- Box office: 1,315,516 admissions (France) £87,338 (UK)

Saraband for Dead Lovers (released in the United States as Saraband) is a 1948 British adventure historical drama film directed by Basil Dearden and starring Stewart Granger and Joan Greenwood. It is based on the 1935 novel by Helen Simpson. Set in 17th-century Hanover, it depicts the doomed romance between Philip Christoph von Königsmarck and Sophia Dorothea of Celle, the wife of the electoral prince of Hanover. The saraband mentioned in the title is a type of Spanish dance.

Jim Morahan, William Kellner and Michael Relph were nominated for the Academy Award for Best Art Direction. It was the first Ealing Studios film shot in colour.

Michael Relph called it "a big disappointment."

== Plot ==
In 1682, 16-year-old Sophia Dorothea of Celle has an arranged marriage to Prince George Louis of Hanover, and she and the prince are both unhappy with the alliance.

She seeks solace from the dashing Count Philip Konigsmark when her husband, later to become King George I of Great Britain, pays her no attention. The lovers are exposed by the jealous Countess Clara Platen, Philip's previous lover.

== Cast ==
- Stewart Granger as Count Philip Konigsmark
- Joan Greenwood as Sophie Dorothea
- Flora Robson as Countess Clara Platen
- Françoise Rosay as The Electress Sophia
- Frederick Valk as The Elector Ernest Augustus
- Peter Bull as Prince George Louis
- Anthony Quayle as Durer
- Michael Gough as Prince Charles
- Megs Jenkins as Frau Busche
- Jill Balcon as Knesbeck
- David Horne as Duke George William
- Mercia Swinburne as Countess Eleanore
- Cecil Trouncer as Major Eck
- Noel Howlett as Count Platen
- Barbara Leake as Maria, Clara's Maid
- Miles Malleson as Lord of Misrule
- Anthony Lang as Young Prince George
- Rosemary Lang as Young Princess Sophie
- Edward Sinclair as Nils
- Allan Jeayes as Governor of Ahlden
- Aubrey Mallalieu as Envoy At Ahlden
- Guy Rolfe as Envoy At Ahlden
- Christopher Lee as Anthony Ulrich, Duke of Brunswick (scenes deleted)

== Background ==
The novel, by Australian author Helen Simpson, was first published in 1935. It was the "book of the month" for the Evening Standard. Simpson adapted the novel into a play but died in 1940 before any production took place.

== Production ==
Film rights were bought by Ealing Studios, which announced in 1946 its plan to produce the film over the following year, with Basil Dearden to direct. The film was Ealing's first colour production.

Mai Zetterling was originally announced for the lead role, but she asked to be excused "on account of a domestic incident" (she was pregnant) and Lilli Palmer was selected to play the role in her place. However, Palmer could not travel to England in time, so Joan Greenwood was given the role.

Michael Relph said the part of the countess was offered to Marlene Dietrich but due to a miscommunication Dietrich thought she was offered the role of Sophia. Dietrich turned it down and the role was played by Flora Robson. Relph felt this hurt the movie at the box office despite the quality of Robson's performance as she was too plain.

Filming took place in June 1947, with exterior sequences shot in Prague and Blenheim Palace.

Stewart Granger later said:

Saraband was a sweet film... and it's one I'm quite proud of. But whereas Gainsborough loved stars, Ealing didn't like them; the production was the star. Saraband was their first big color film. I said I would do it, but I wanted Marlene Dietrich, whom I loved, for Clara. I felt I couldn't be brutal to Flora Robson. Flora was a great actress, but she'd never been beautiful and it was hard to be cruel to a woman who was never beautiful. That's why I wanted Dietrich for the part. The opening sequence was planned in great detail. Francoise Rosay wanted to rehearse... but in the end this wasn't used. You see, Koenigsmark, whom I played, was introduced as penniless, and this was cut out because it involved Jewish moneylenders.

In August 1947, Variety reported that the script was being rewritten in order to comply with the American production code.

Peter Bull recalled: "They made me shave my head for that one in order that, as King George I of England, I could frighten the daylights out of my wife (the delectable Miss Joan Greenwood). They (the director and producer) assured me that my hair would grow ever so quickly and ever so much stronger after the shaving operation. This was not, I fear, strictly true and actually absolute rubbish."

Filming was completed in October 1947.

== Reception ==
=== Critical ===
In 1988, George MacDonald Fraser, wrote: "As a screen entertainment it has never been judged remarkable; as an example of what a historical movie should be - a faithful dramatisation of fact - it is near-perfect." He added it "tells the story... with complete fidelity, and only the smallest of romantic touches, and makes an enthralling film of it. Stewart Granger (Konigsmark) was born for this kind of costume picture, and Joan Greenwood is an appealing Sophia. ... Best of all, the film conveys in a few brief scenes, the stifling monotony of court life in a pretentious little German state; in this too, Saraband is good history."

=== Box office ===
The film was a box-office disappointment. It earned distributor's gross receipts of £87,338 in the UK, of which £59,034 went to the film's producer. The film made a loss of £312,171.

Michael Relph later said: "it was a magnificent looking film, but it wasn't a success at the time. We were trying to get away from the Gainsborough-type romantic costume picture, which was totally unreal, and to do a serious historical epic. I think the public probably wasn't ready for it and also it ended up being a bit heavy."

The film became one of Ealing's most successful in Germany.

=== Awards ===
The acclaimed production design and art direction (nominated for an Academy Award) was complemented by the cinematography of Douglas Slocombe, who employed a muted style of colour filming that drew widely mixed opinions. Some described the approach as unusual and different while others found it pretentiously symbolic and with exterior and interior shots poorly matched.

== In popular culture ==
- British gothic rock band Sex Gang Children recorded a song titled "Saraband for Dead Lovers".
