= Jim Morahan =

British art director (1902–1976)

Jim Morahan (26 December 1902 in Lambeth, London – 1976 in Sudbury, Suffolk) was a British art director. He began his career in film in 1936. He worked in a number of prominent British productions in the 1940s and 1950s, such as Scott of the Antarctic (1948), Whisky Galore! (1949), The Blue Lamp (1950), The Man in the White Suit (1951), The Cruel Sea (1953), The Ladykillers (1955) and Those Magnificent Men in their Flying Machines (1965). He earned an Academy Award nomination in 1949 for Saraband for Dead Lovers.

== Selected filmography ==
=== Art director ===
- Frieda (1947)
- Saraband for Dead Lovers (1948)
- Train of Events (1949)
- The Blue Lamp (1950)
- Cage of Gold (1950)
- The Magnet (1950)
- The Man in the White Suit (1951)
- Pool of London (1951)
- The Gentle Gunman (1952)
- His Excellency (1952)
- Mandy (1952)
- The Cruel Sea (1953)
- The Square Ring (1953)
- The Ladykillers (1955)
- Out of the Clouds (1955)
- Who Done It? (1956)
- Dunkirk (1958)
- The Navy Lark (1959)
- A Prize of Arms (1962)
- The Mind Benders (1963)

=== Assistant art director ===
- The Bells Go Down (1943)
- My Learned Friend (1943)
- For Those in Peril (1944)
- They Came to a City (1944)
- The Halfway House (1944)
- Dead of Night (1945)
- The Captive Heart (1946)
- Dance Hall (1950)
- Those Magnificent Men in Their Flying Machines (1965)
