= Kurt Christoph von Königsmarck =

Dutch-Swedish military leader

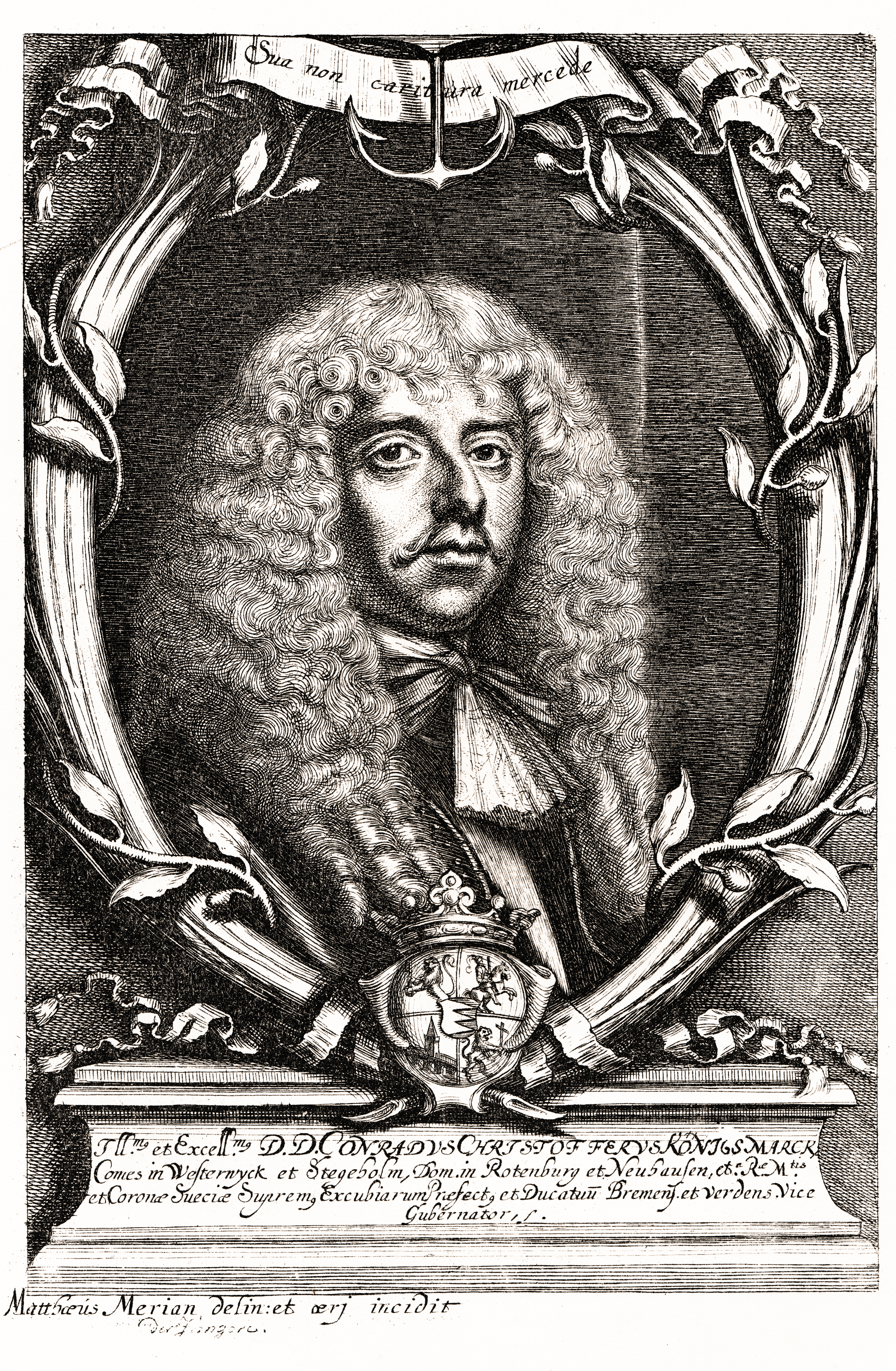
- Portrait of Conrad Christoff von Königsmarck by Matthaeus Merian the Younger
- Born: 24 March 1634
- Died: 31 October 1673 (aged 39); Bonn
- Spouse: Maria Christina von Wrangel
- Children: Karl Johann von Königsmarck; Maria Aurora von Königsmarck; Amalia Wilhelmina von Königsmarck; Philip Christoph von Königsmarck
- Parent(s): Hans Christoff von Königsmarck; Agathe von Leesten

Conrad or Kurt Christoph von Königsmarck (24 March 1634 – 31 October 1673) was a Dutch-Swedish military leader.

He was the son of Hans Christoff von Königsmarck and Agathe von Leesten and the brother of Otto Wilhelm von Königsmarck and Beata Elisabet von Königsmarck.

== Career ==
Königsmarck received an education despite the war and later joined the Swedish army. He took part in the bloody battle near Warsaw in 1656. In 1658 under Charles X command during the crossing over the frozen Great Belt Bridge to Funen he was caught by the Danes and was left free only after the Peace of Roskilde. In 1663 after the death of his father he became a vice-governor of the Duchy of Bremen-Verden and commander of Stade.

He served the stadthouder William III of Orange in Bodegraven during the Rampjaar. When 10,000 French troops under the command of François-Henri de Montmorency, duc de Luxembourg arrived over the frozen ice of the Hollandic Water Line from Woerden on 27 December 1672, he retreated to Leiden. There the councilman Cornelis Hop and others kept the gates closed and ordered him back to Alphen aan de Rijn in order to defend the Water Line at Gouwsluis. His retreat enabled the Duke of Luxembourg to destroy Bodegraven and Zwammerdam.

Königsmarck was killed in the Siege of Bonn by an accidental cannon shot from friendly side at the age of 39. In a year his body was reburied in Stade. He was known for his charitable gifts, as for example a rebuilding of burnt church in Stade in 1659.

== Personal life ==
He married Countess Maria Christina von Wrangel, the daughter of Count Hermann von Wrangel. They had five children, four of whom lived to adulthood:

- Karl Johann von Königsmarck (1659-1686)
- Maria Aurora von Königsmarck (1662-1728)
- Amalia Wilhelmina von Königsmarck (1663-1740)
- Philip Christoph von Königsmarck (1665-1694)
- Gustaf Herman von Königsmarck (1668–1669), who died in infancy
