= Tapetskolan vid Karlberg =

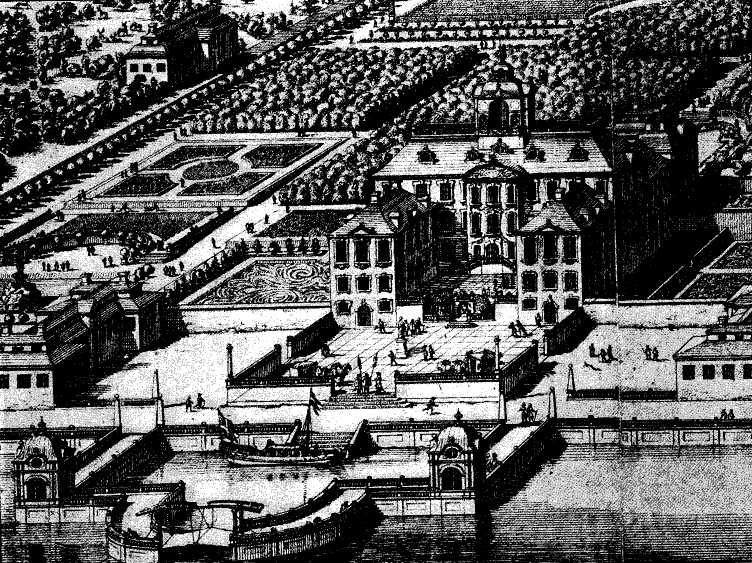
Karlberg Palace in the 1690s From Suecia antiqua et hodierna

Tapetskolan vid Karlberg ('Karlberg Tapestry School') or Tapetväfveriet vid Karlbergs slott ('Karlberg Tapestry Weaver's Workshop'), also called Karlbergsfabriken ('Karlberg Factory'), was a Swedish orphanage and a school for girls. It was founded by Ulrika Eleonora of Denmark, Queen Consort of King Charles XI of Sweden. She founded a large number of charitable institutions which were paid by her personally. The handicrafts school was situated at the royal summer residence Karlberg Palace (Karlbergs slott) which King Charles XI had purchased in 1688.

Tapetskolan vid Karlberg was active from 1688 to 1695. Queen Ulrika Eleonora died in 1693 and King Charles XI in 1697. The school of the orphanage was especially known for the tapestry workshop in which the girls manufactured tapestries. Tapestry artist, Anna Maria Schmilau, was the instructor and head mistress of the royal tapestry handicrafts school. Several tapestries of the work of the women at this school are still preserved in the Swedish Royal Collection (Kungliga Husgerådskammaren) in Stockholm.

== Other sources ==
- Svenskt konstnärslexikon del V, sid 74, Allhems Förlag: Malmö.
- Böttiger, John, 1853-1936; Levy-Ullmann, Gaston, Svenska statens samling af väfda tapeter; historik och beskrifvande förteckning, af dr. John Böttiger, Stockholm, Fröléen & comp. (C. Suneson), 1895
- Nordisk familjebok / Uggleupplagan. 30. Tromsdalstind - Urakami
