= Anna Maria Schmilau =

Swedish artist (died 1725)

Anna Maria Schmilau née Niedermans (died 23 May 1725) was a Swedish tapestry artist.

Schmilau was married to the ensign Jacob Hartwich Schmilau. In 1690, she was the instructor and head mistress of the royal tapestry handicrafts school for women on Karlberg Palace, the Tapetskolan vid Karlberg which had been established by the queen, Ulrika Eleonora of Denmark, so that women could be educated in an artist profession which would make it possible for them to support themselves as something else than domestics. Several tapestries are preserved of the work of the women at this school, which was closed after the death of the queen in 1693. However, as the tapestries are noted as manufactured by the team of the school and not signed by an individual artist, the work of Anna Maria Schmilau can not be singled out.
