= Philip Christoph von Königsmarck =

Swedish count and soldier (1665–1694)

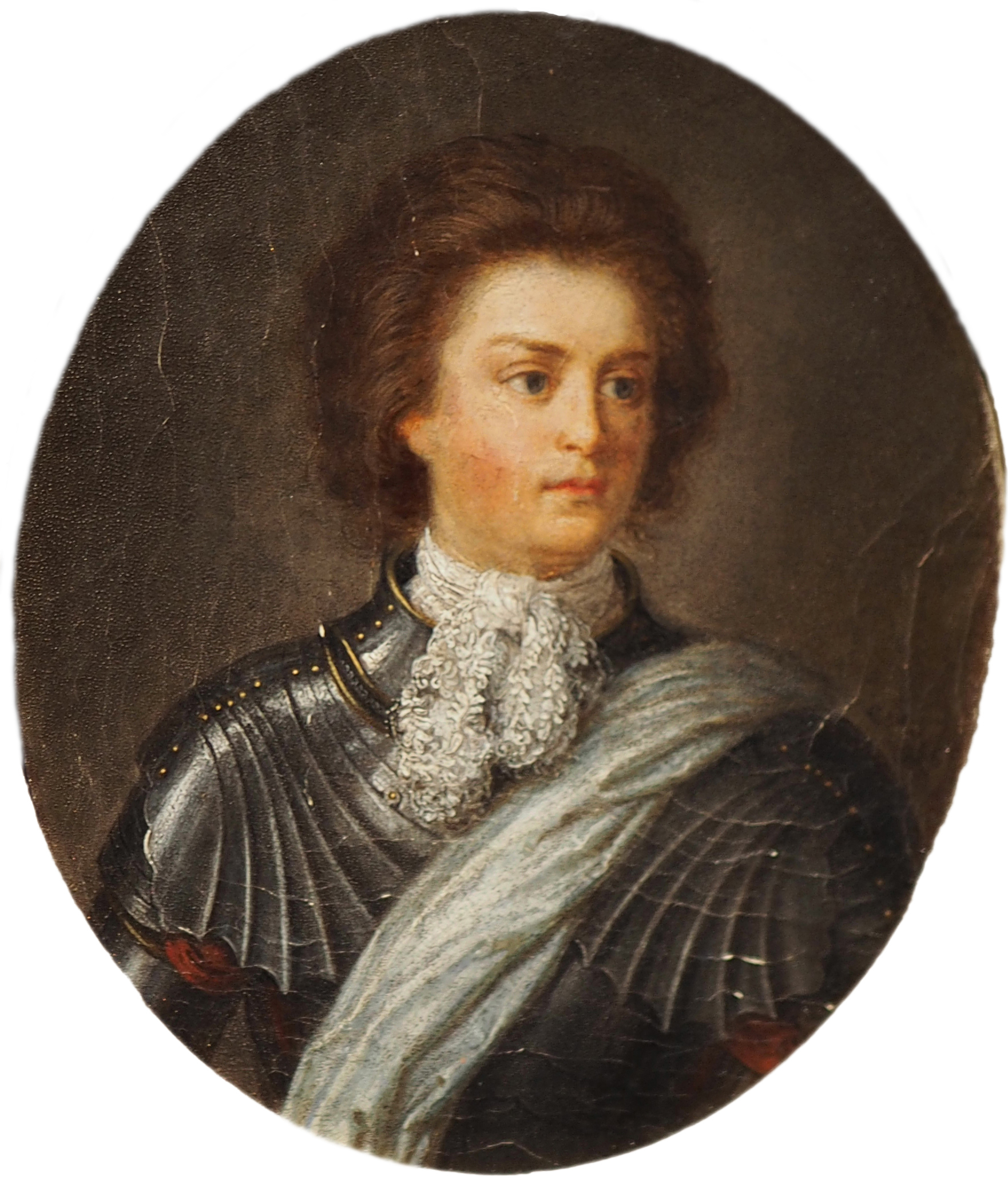
- Born: 4 March 1665; Stade, Germany, Bremen-Verden (now Lower Saxony, Germany
- Disappeared: 2 July 1694 (aged 29) in the Principality of Calenberg
- Died: Unknown
- Occupations: Count, Soldier
- Parents: Count Kurt Christoph von Königsmarck (father); Maria Christina von Wrangel (mother)

Count Philip Christoph von Königsmarck (4 March 1665 – 2 July 1694), also spelled Philipp, was a Swedish count and soldier. He was allegedly the lover of Sophia Dorothea, Princess of Celle, the wife of Duke George Louis of Brunswick and Lüneburg, the heir presumptive of the Principality of Calenberg, later to become Elector of Hanover (as George I Louis, 1708) and King of Great Britain (as George I, 1714).

== Background ==
Königsmarck was born in Stade. He was the grandson of the Swedish Field Marshal Hans Christoff von Königsmarck, Bremen-Verden's governor general in Stade, and nephew to the Swedish Field Marshal Otto Wilhelm Königsmarck and Beata Elisabet von Königsmarck. He was the son of Count Kurt Christoph von Königsmarck (1634–1673), son of Hans Christoff von Königsmarck, and Countess Maria Christina von Wrangel (1628–1691), daughter of Count Herman Wrangel.

His sister Maria Aurora of Königsmarck was later mistress to Augustus II the Strong of Poland, with whom she had the son Maurice de Saxe, the brilliant French military commander. His other sister Amalia Wilhelmina was a noted dilettante artist.

His brother Karl Johann von Königsmarck is alleged to have hired three assassins to kill Thomas Thynne – husband of heiress Elizabeth Seymour, Duchess of Somerset, whom Königsmarck had been wooing – on 12 February 1681. The assassins were hanged on 10 March 1682, though their alleged hirer was acquitted.

== Disappearance ==
After wandering and fighting in various parts of Europe he entered the service of Ernest Augustus, Elector of Hanover. Here he made the acquaintance of Sophia Dorothea, and assisted her in one or two futile attempts to escape from her husband in Hanover. He is remembered as the lover of the princess, due to the large number of love letters that are now preserved at the University of Lund. On the morning of 2 July 1694, after a meeting with Sophia at the Leineschloss castle, Königsmark was seized and disappeared.

It is presumed that he was murdered in Hanover at the instigation of George Louis, and that his body was disposed of in the Leine river upon which the Leineschloss is situated. It is alleged that two of those involved in his death made confessions years later. In August 2016 bones were found under the Leineschloss castle during a renovation project; it was believed that these bones were the remains of Königsmarck. However, subsequent tests proved that some of the bones were from animals, while the human bones came from at least five different skeletons. None have been proved to belong to Königsmarck.

== Publication of purported love letters ==
Most of the letters alleged to have passed between Königsmarck and Sophia Dorothea were published by William Henry Wilkins in The Love of an Uncrowned Queen (2 parts, 1900). The majority of the letters are now in the possession of Lund University in Sweden, although a few ended up in the possession of Sophia Dorothea's grandson, King Frederick the Great of Prussia, after his sister, the Swedish Queen consort Louisa Ulrika, allegedly stole them and sent them to him. Today it is now known that the letters between the two are authentic beyond any doubt.

== In popular culture ==
Königsmarck featured in Helen de Guerry Simpson's 1935 novel Saraband for Dead Lovers and the 1948 film of the same name and A. E. W. Mason's 1938 novel Königsmarck.

The 1948 costume historical romantic film, Saraband for Dead Lovers (called Saraband in the U.S.) starring Stewart Granger, Joan Greenwood, Peter Bull, Flora Robson, and Anthony Quayle and directed by Basil Dearden is based on the story.

== See also ==
- List of people who disappeared mysteriously (pre-1910)
