= Beata Elisabet von Königsmarck =

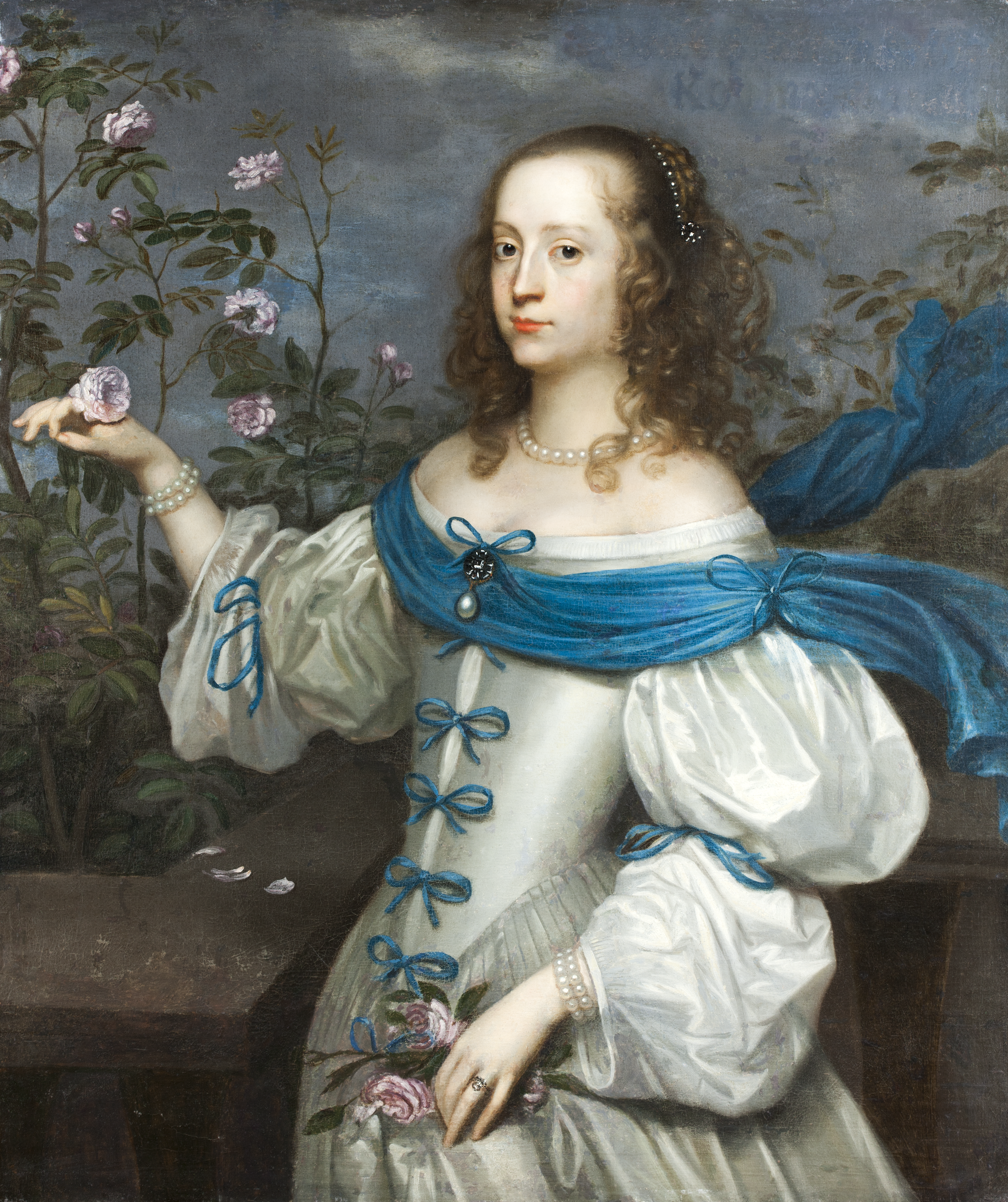
Beata Elisabet von Königsmarck by Hendrik Munnichhoven, 1654.

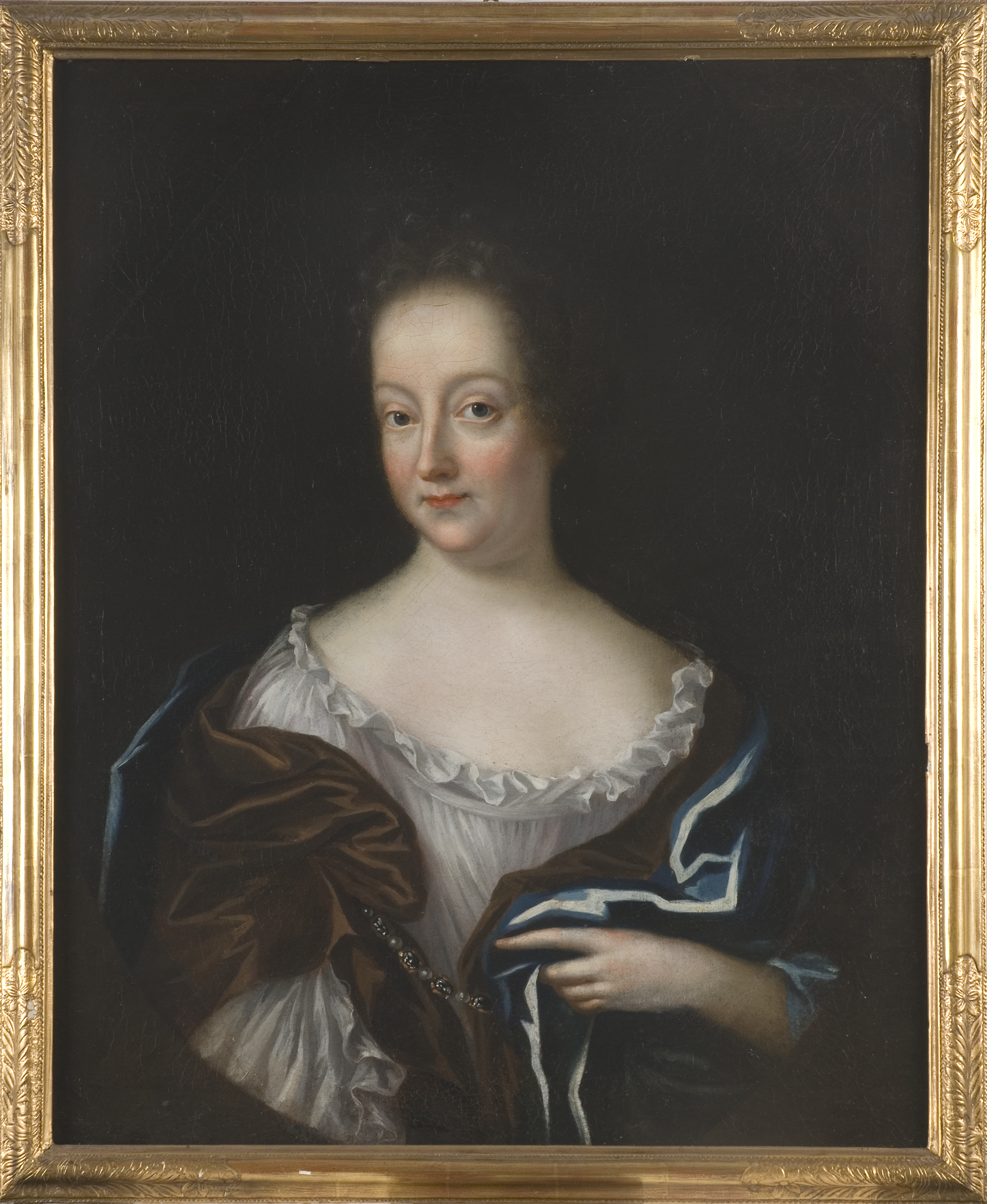
Beata Elisabet von Königsmarck by Lucas von Breda, unknown date

Beata Elisabet von Königsmarck (1637–1723) was a Swedish countess and landowner.

== Life ==
She was the daughter of Hans Christoff von Königsmarck and Barbara von Leist; through her brother, she was thereby the paternal aunt of Carl Johan von Königsmarck, Amalia von Königsmarck, Aurora von Königsmarck and Philip Christoph von Königsmarck. In 1655, she married count Pontus Fredrik De la Gardie (1630-1692), a younger brother of Magnus Gabriel De la Gardie, and became the mother of four daughters of which of which only two survived to mature adulthood: Ebba Maria De la Gardie (1658 – 1697), Johanna Eleonora De la Gardie (1661 – 1708), Christina Juliana De la Gardie (1662 – 1664), and Christina Vilhelmina De la Gardie (1664 – 1684). Unfortunately, both of Beata Elisabet's surviving daughters had delicate lungs and went on to die at young ages.

=== Marriage of Charles XII ===
Beata Elisabet von Königsmarck belonged to the elite of the Swedish aristocracy, often attended court, and had a wide net of powerful contacts. She used these contacts for political purposes and was commissioned as an agent by France through its ambassador in Sweden, D'Avaux. Between 1697 and 1699, there was a Danish policy to create an alliance with Sweden through a double wedding between Charles XII of Sweden and Princess Sophia Hedwig of Denmark, and Prince Charles of Denmark and Hedvig Sophia of Sweden (after the marriage of Hedvig Sophia in 1698, she was replaced by Ulrika Eleonora of Sweden).

The plan was supported by France, which also wished for an alliance between Sweden and Denmark. Beata Elisabet von Königsmarck was commissioned by the Danish diplomat Jens Juel to use her net of contacts at court to create support for the marriage alliances with the Swedish royal court and monarch. Ultimately, however, the plan failed. Both Denmark and France described her as among their most valued agents in service of the Dano-France policy of a Danish-Swedish alliance. A proposed reason for her pro-Danish policy has been suggested to be the fact that several of her estates was situated in Scania, and that she wished to protect her interests, as her Scanian estates had been sacked during the Scanian War in 1675-79.

=== Landowner ===
Beata Elisabet von Königsmarck belonged to a very wealthy family and brought a fortune of her own in to her marriage. Despite the fact that she was, as a married woman, legally a minor under the guardianship of her husband, she still managed her own fortune by herself as her separate property, without any interference of her spouse. The marriage was unhappy, and reportedly, her husband was forced to rely on his rich sister, Maria Sofia De la Gardie, to be able to finance his drinking habits and interest in prostitutes, as his wife refused to do so. During the Reduction of 1680, her husband's fortune was confiscated by the crown, so he resided in his own estate, while she resided on hers.

In 1661, her husband bought Skarhult Castle with her money. As she was legally a minor as a married woman, she was not listed as its owner until after she was widowed (and thereby no longer a minor) in 1692. In reality, however, she managed the estate from the beginning until her death, as well as the estate Marsvinsholm Castle, without any interference from him.
