= Amalia von Königsmarck =

Swedish poet and artist (1663–1740)

Amalia Wilhelmina Lewenhaupt
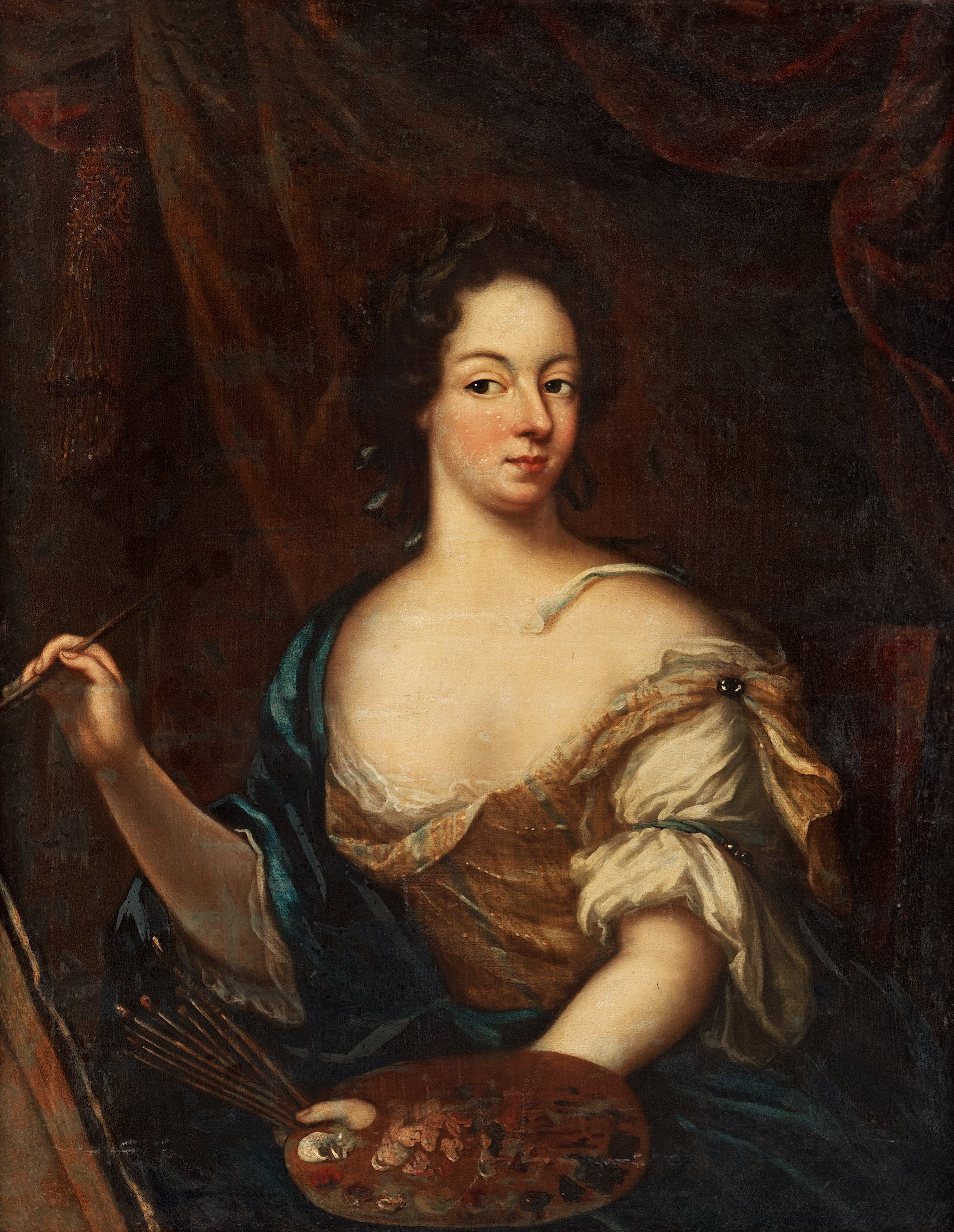
- Born: Amalia Wilhelmina von Königsmarck; 20 August 1663; Stade
- Died: 30 January 1740 (aged 76); Övedskloster
- Known for: painting, poetry, acting
- Spouse: Carl Gustaf Lewenhaupt (m. 1689)
- Children: 10, including Charles Emil Lewenhaupt
- Parents: Kurt Christoph von Königsmarck (father); Maria Christina von Wrangel (mother)

Countess Amalia Wilhelmina "Emilie" Lewenhaupt (née von Königsmarck; 20 August 1663 – 30 January 1740) was a Swedish noblewoman of German descent who became known as a dilettante painter, actor, and poet.

== Life ==
Amalia Wilhelmina von Königsmarck was born in Stade, a daughter of Count Kurt Christoph von Königsmarck (1634–1673) and Countess Maria Christina von Wrangel-Lindeberg (1638–1691). She was the sister of Philip Christoph von Königsmarck, Aurora von Königsmarck and Karl Johann von Königsmarck and a paternal niece of Otto Wilhelm von Königsmarck.

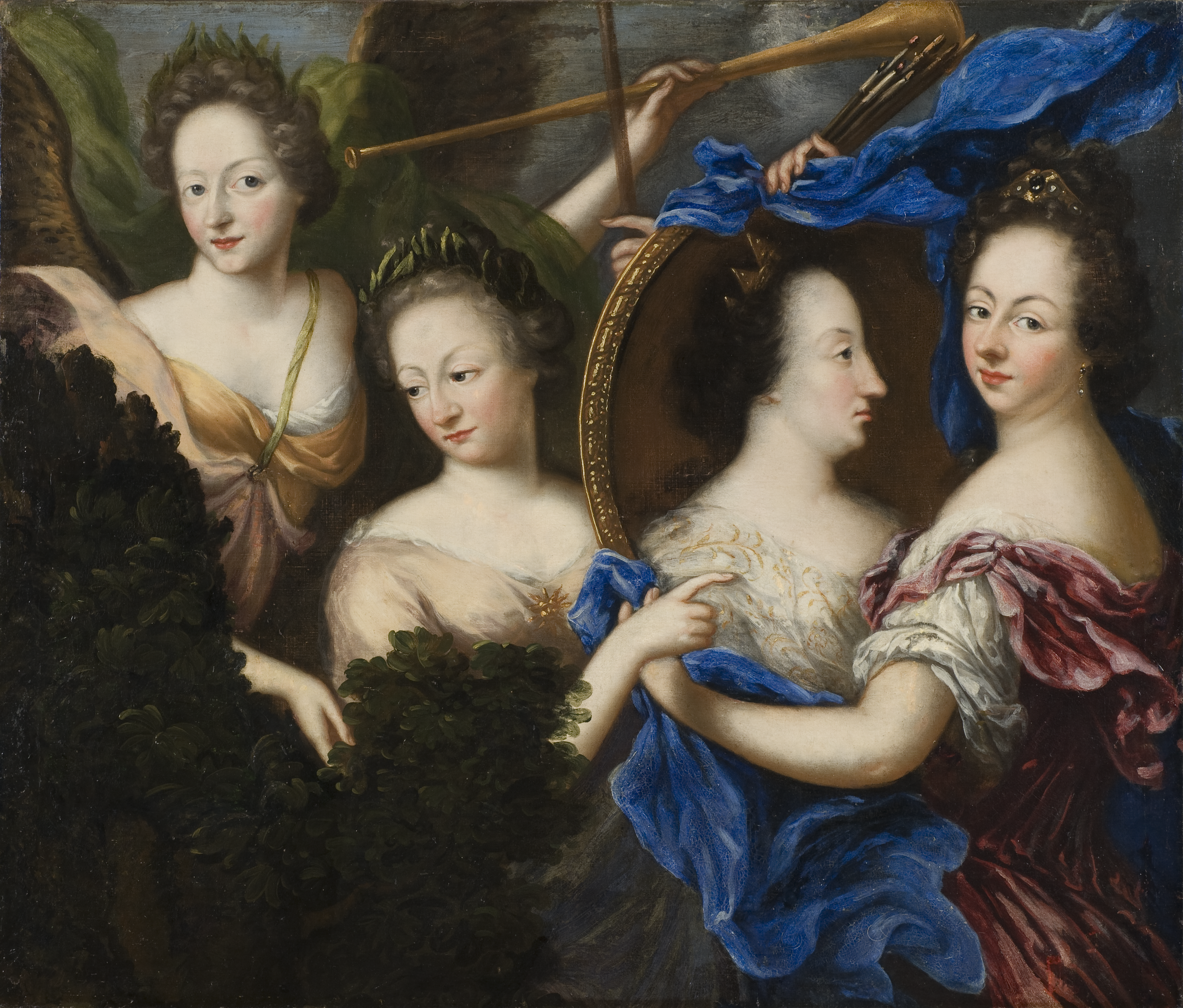
Allegory with self-portrait and profile portrait of Ulrika Eleonora the Elder attributed to Amalia von Königsmarck

Königsmarck belonged to the royal court-dilettantes who were among the students of David Klöcker Ehrenstrahl. Her known paintings include a self-portrait from 1688, a portrait of her sister Aurora, a portrait of the noblewoman Katarina Ebba Horn from 1698, and a portrait of Sophia Dorothea of Hanover.

She was encouraged to participate in the amateur theatre of the royal court by the queen, Ulrika Eleonora of Denmark. In the winter of 1683–84, a group of female courtiers performed the Swedish première of Iphigénie by Jean Racine at court. In the play, Johanna Eleonora De la Gardie acted the part of Iphigénie, Amalia Königsmarck the part of Achilles, Aurora Königsmarck the part of Clitemnestre, Augusta Wrangel the part of Agamemnon, and Ebba Maria De la Gardie the part of Eriphile. This is regarded as a significant event, as it was the first play performed by an all-female cast in Sweden and symbolized the introduction of French classicism to the country.

Amalia Königsmarck also wrote poetry. Her poetry was published by Hanselli in the 19th century.

She married count Carl Gustaf Lewenhaupt (1662–1703) in the presence of the royal family on 5 January 1689 and became the mother of ten children. In addition, Amalia Lewenhaupt suffered three miscarriages: in 1693, 1694 and 1702. After her marriage, she was constantly pregnant and on the move, which is why art was no longer a priority in her life.

In 1695, Amalia Lewenhaupt convinced her spouse to enlist in the service of Augustus II the Strong, who was at that time the lover of her sister Aurora. Because of this, her spouse was sentenced to confiscation of property and death in his absence by Charles XII of Sweden in 1703, during the Great Northern War. The same year, however, her spouse died in exile in Hamburg in Germany. She returned to Sweden in 1722. Upon her return to Sweden, she brought with her the fortuneteller Höffern.

In 1740, Lewenhaupt died in Övedskloster, aged 76. She was thus spared the sorrow of seeing her firstborn son, Charles Emil Lewenhaupt, condemned to death and executed for treason in 1743.

== Sources ==
- Svenskt konstnärslexikon (Swedish Art dictionary) Allhems Förlag Malmö
- Lars Löfgren: Svensk teater (Swedish theatre) Natur & Kultur, Stockholm 2003, sid. 46. ISBN 91-27-09672-6.
- Königsmarck, släkter, urn:sbl:11939, Svenskt biografiskt lexikon, hämtad 2015-01-21.
- Minnespenningar öfver enskilda svenska män och qvinnor
