= Maria Aurora von Königsmarck =

Swedish and German noblewoman

- Provost of Quedlinburg Abbey
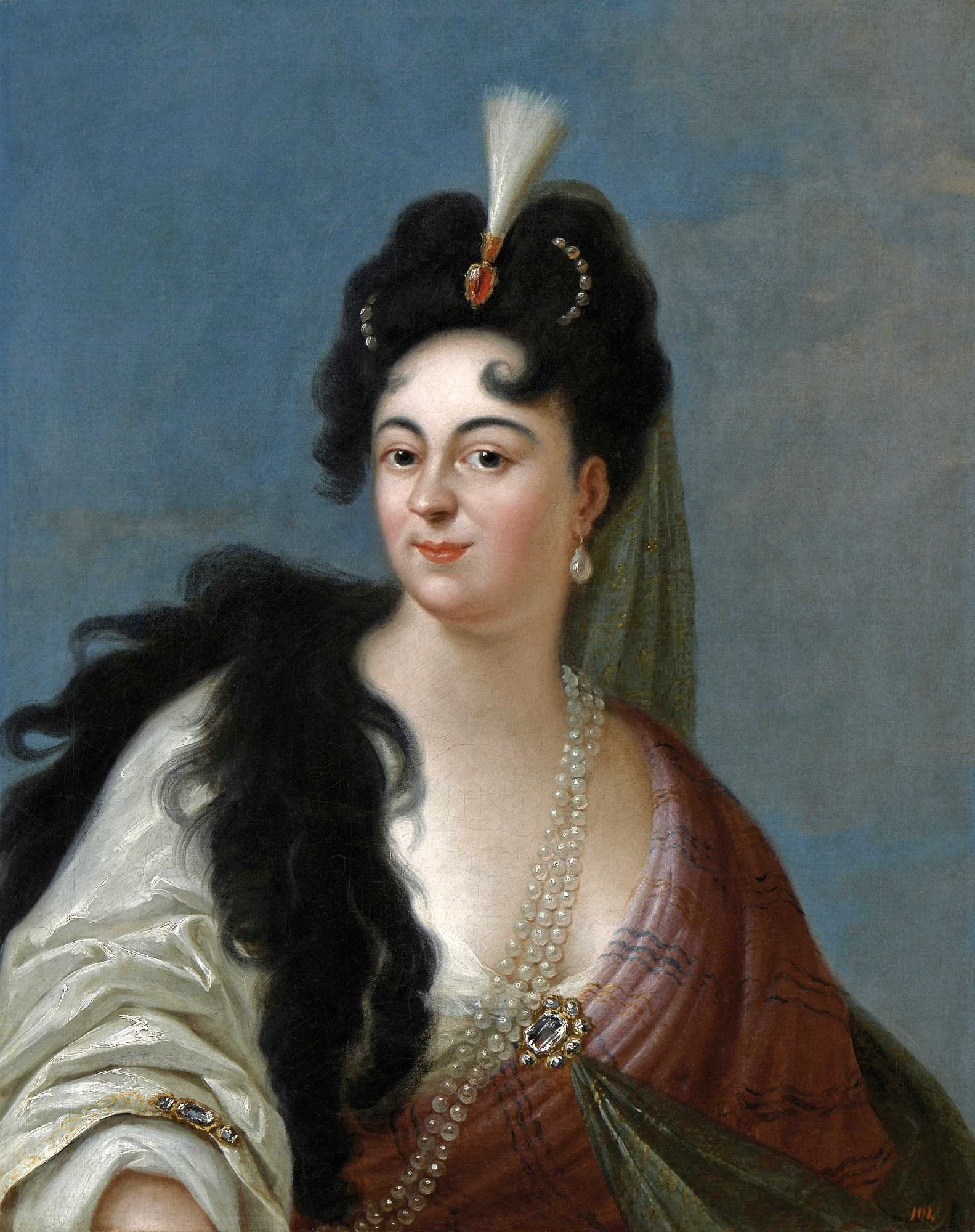
- Known for: Mistress of Augustus the Strong
- Born: 28 April 1662; Stade
- Died: 16 February 1728 (aged 65); Quedlinburg
- Noble family: Königsmarck
- Issue: Maurice de Saxe
- Father: Kurt Christoph von Königsmarck
- Mother: Maria Christina von Wrangel

Countess Maria Aurora von Königsmarck (Swedish: Aurora Königsmarck) (28 April 1662 – 16 February 1728) was a Swedish and German noblewoman of Brandenburg extraction and mistress of Augustus the Strong, Elector of Saxony and King of Poland.

== Life ==
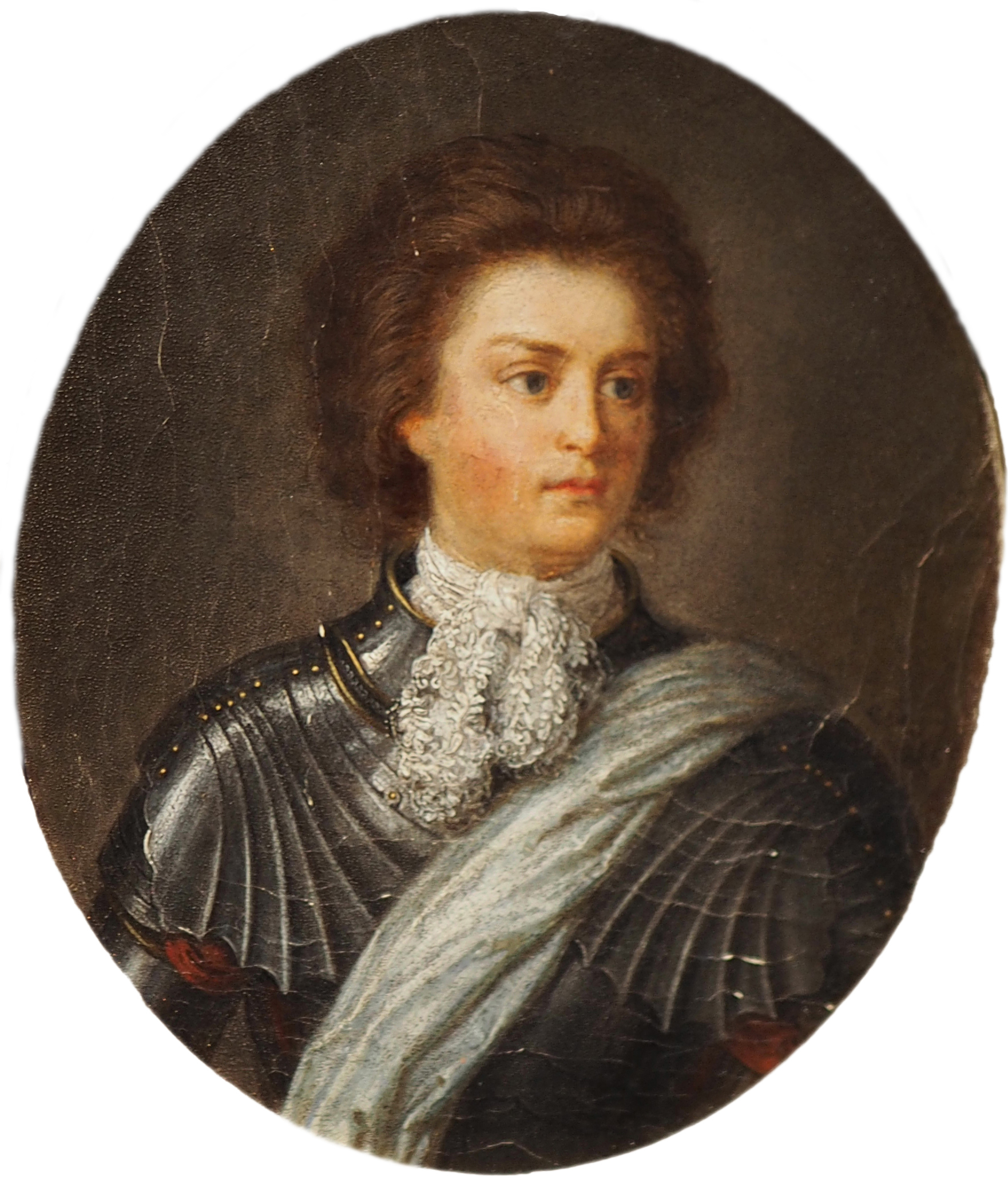
Count Philipp Christoph of Königsmarck

Aurora von Königsmarck was born at Stade, as the second child and eldest daughter of Count Kurt Christoph von Königsmarck (1634-1673), son of Hans Christoff von Königsmarck, and his wife Countess Maria Christina von Wrangel (1638-1691), daughter of Count Hermann von Wrangel and his wife Amalia Magdalena, Countess of Nassau-Siegen (1613-1669). Her elder brother, Karl Johann, was a Knight of Malta and a famous adventurer; her two younger siblings were the dilettante artist Amalia Wilhelmina von Lewenhaupt by marriage and Philip Christoph, who was the lover of the princess Sophia of Celle, wife of the later King George I of Great Britain.

She spent her childhood in the Agathenburg Castle. When her father died in 1673, her mother Maria Christina took the place of head of the family. From 1677, she began to travel with her family and visit the family properties in Sweden and Germany.

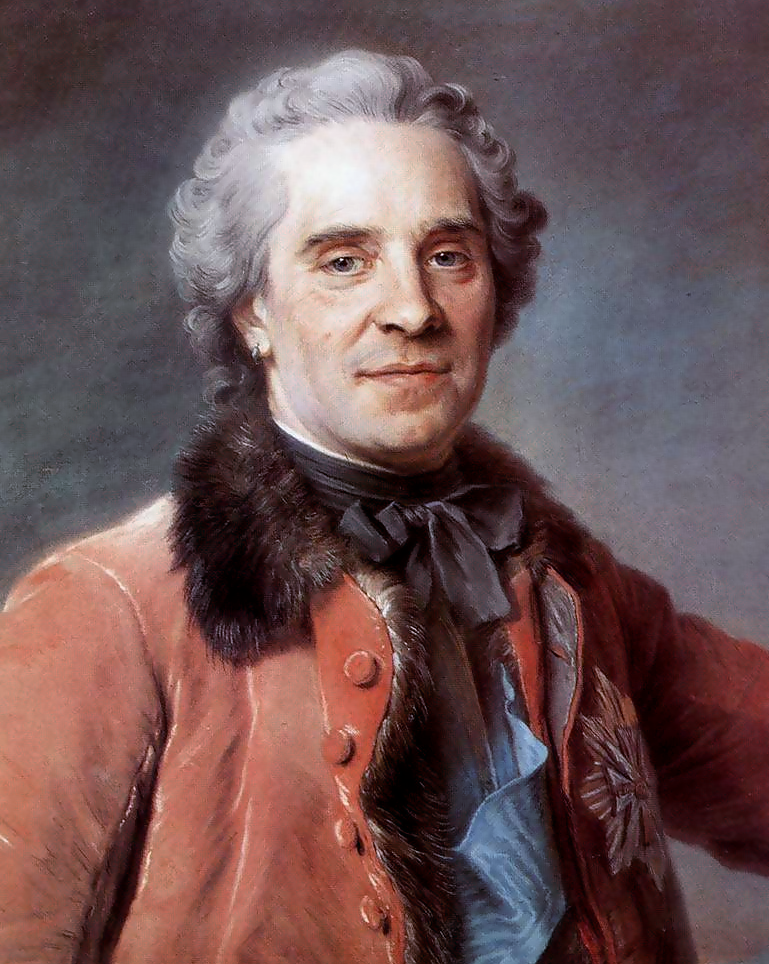
Maurice of Saxony

In Sweden, she and her sister Amalia were among the most known participants in the amateur theatre of the royal court, which had the patronage of the queen, Ulrika Eleonora of Denmark. In the winter of 1683–84, a group of female courtiers performed the Swedish premier of Iphigénie by Racine at court. In the play, Johanna Eleonora De la Gardie acted in the part of Iphigenie, Amalia Königsmarck as Achilles, Aurora Königsmarck as Clitemnestre, Augusta Wrangel as Agamemnon, and Ebba Maria De la Gardie as Eriphile. This is regarded as a significant event as the first play performed by an all female cast in Sweden, as an introduction of French Classicism in Sweden.

She also belonged to the intellectual circle around the Salonist and poet Sophia Elisabet Brenner.

When her mother died (1691), Aurora left Sweden. She and her sister passed some years at Hamburg, where she attracted attention both through her beauty and her talents. In 1694 she went to Dresden, to make inquiries about her brother Philip Christoph of Königsmarck, who had mysteriously disappeared from Hanover. She solicited the help of the Elector Frederick Augustus I to find Philip and, in case he was dead, to resolve any potential inheritance issues.

Shortly after, the eight years younger Elector made her his first official mistress. On 28 October 1696, in the city of Goslar, she gave birth to a son, Maurice, who later became the famous Marshal General of France.

However, the Elector quickly tired of Aurora, who then spent her time trying to secure the position of princess-abbess of the Quedlinburg Abbey, an office which carried with it princely dignity as imperial estate of the Holy Roman Empire, and to recover the lost inheritance of her family in Sweden. In January 1698 she was made coadjutor abbess and two years later (1700) provostess (German: Pröpstin) of the Abbey, but lived mainly in Berlin, Dresden and Hamburg. She was replaced as mistress by her own companion, Maria Aurora of Spiegel.

In 1702 she went on a diplomatic errand to Charles XII of Sweden in his winter camp in Courland on behalf of Augustus, but her adventurous journey ended in failure. The countess, who was described by Voltaire as "the most famous woman of two centuries", died at Quedlinburg, aged sixty-five. Her namesake and great-great-granddaughter, Aurore Dupin, became the French novelist George Sand.
