= Karl Johann von Königsmarck =

Swedish count and soldier

Carl Johann von Königsmarck
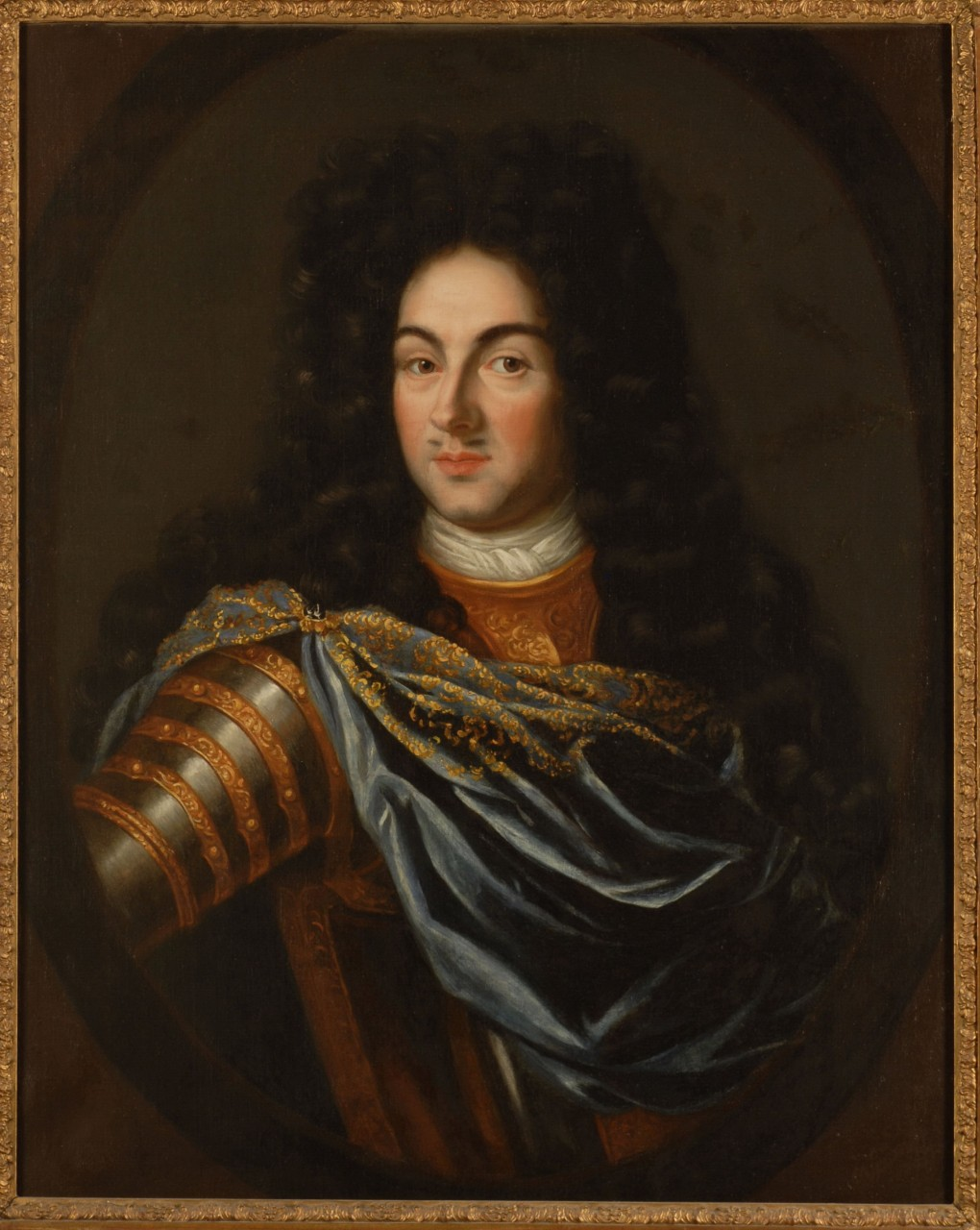
- Portrait by Martin Mytens
- Born: 15 May 1659; Nyborg
- Died: 28 August 1686 (aged 27)
- Parents: Kurt Christoph von Königsmarck (father); Maria Christina von Wrangel (mother)

Carl Johann von Königsmarck (15 May 1659 – 28 August 1686) was a Swedish count of Brandenburgian extraction and a soldier.

Königsmarck was born in Nyborg in Funen, Denmark, as the second son of Count Kurt Christoph von Königsmarck and his wife Countess Maria Christina von Wrangel (1628–1691). He was the grandson of two Field Marshals; Hermann von Wrangel and Hans Christoff von Königsmarck. His sister Maria Aurora von Königsmarck was later mistress to Augustus II the Strong of Poland, with whom she had the son Maurice de Saxe, the brilliant French military commander. His other sister Amalia Wilhelmina was a noted dilettante artist. His brother Philip Christoph von Königsmarck died under mysterious circumstances after starting an affair with Sophia Dorothea of Celle, the daughter of George William, Duke of Brunswick-Lüneburg.

Karl Johann von Königsmarck is alleged to have hired three assassins who killed Thomas Thynne – husband of heiress Elizabeth Seymour, Duchess of Somerset, whom Königsmarck had been wooing – on 12 February 1682 (2 February 1681 O.S.) The assassins were hanged on 10 March 1682, though their alleged hirer was acquitted, but banished. After leaving England he joined the army of his uncle Otto Wilhelm von Königsmarck in Greece. He died of wounds contracted during the Morean War in Nauplion.
