= Ida Maier-Müller =

German painter

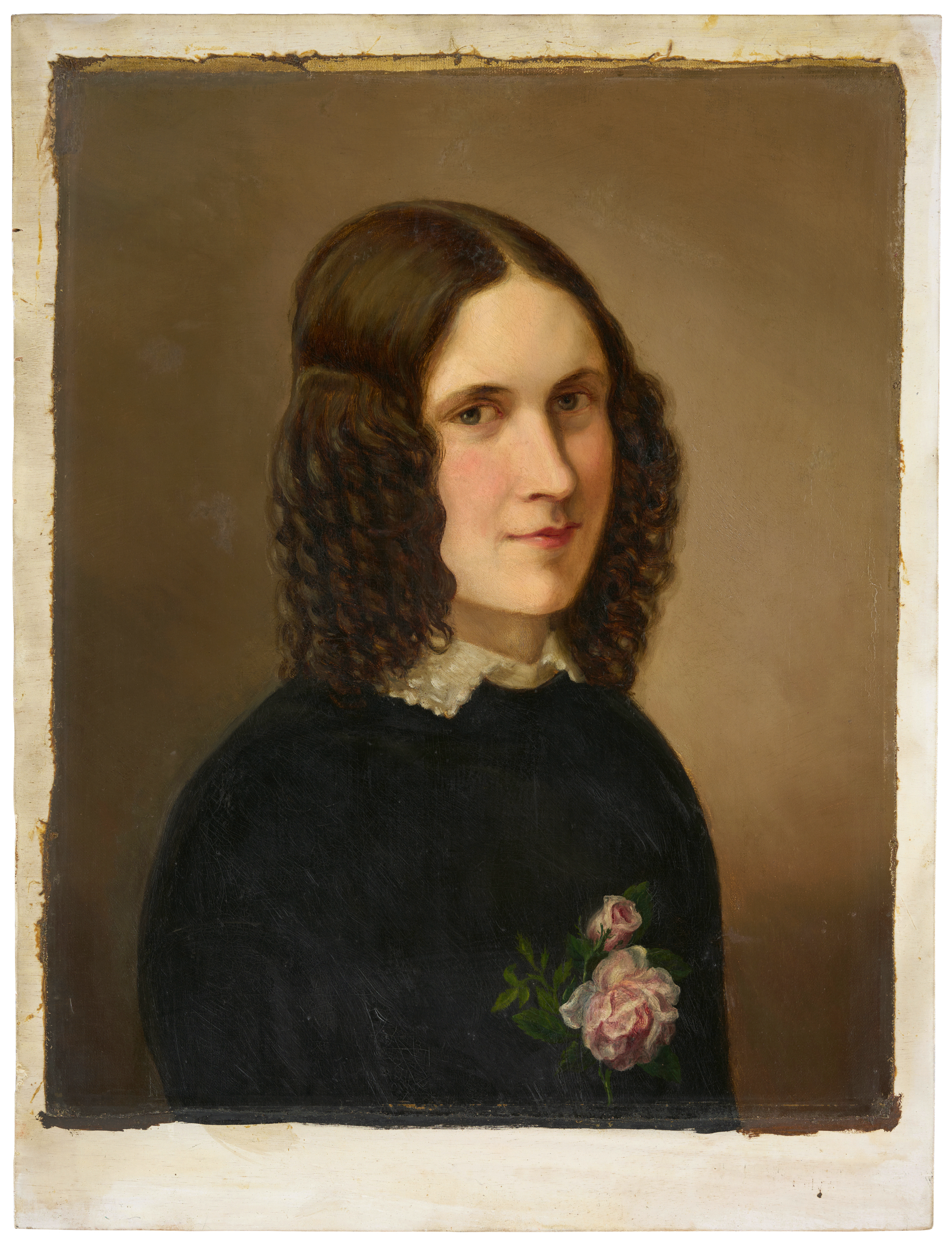
Self-portrait - Ida Maier - Augustiner M Freiburg - 1845

Ida Maier-Müller was a German painter known primarily for her landscape paintings and self-portraits. She was born in Konstanz in 1821 and died in Offenburg in 1904.

She settled in Freiburg in 1843, where she captured the beauty of the local landscapes, especially those of the Black Forest and Lake Constance, in her paintings and prints. One of her best-known works is a self-portrait from 1845, showing her with curly hair, aged 25. This self-portrait is one of her most iconic works, and is housed in the Augustiner Museum in Freiburg. Ida Maier was also renowned for her paintings of flowers and other natural scenes, maintaining a strong connection with the 19th-century German landscape tradition. Despite her talent and contributions to regional art, Ida is a little-known artist today, remaining on the fringes of mainstream art history, with few works widely disseminated.

Maier-Müller is remembered, to a lesser extent, primarily for one of her fabulous self-portraits. In the history of art, self-portraiture is a practice charged with complex intentions that go beyond the simple visual record of the artist. Traditionally dominated by men, the genre of self-portrait provided painters such as Rembrandt, Dürer, and Van Gogh with the opportunity to immortalize their images and explore questions of identity, status, and artistic style. However, the female self-portrait emerges in a uniquely challenging historical and cultural context. Women artists, throughout the centuries, have faced obstacles to formal education, public exhibition, and artistic recognition. Faced with these constraints, the act of painting themselves became for them a gesture of claiming identity, space, and artistic authority.

== See also ==
- Female self-portrait in painting
