= Self-portraits by women painters =

Aspect of portrait painting

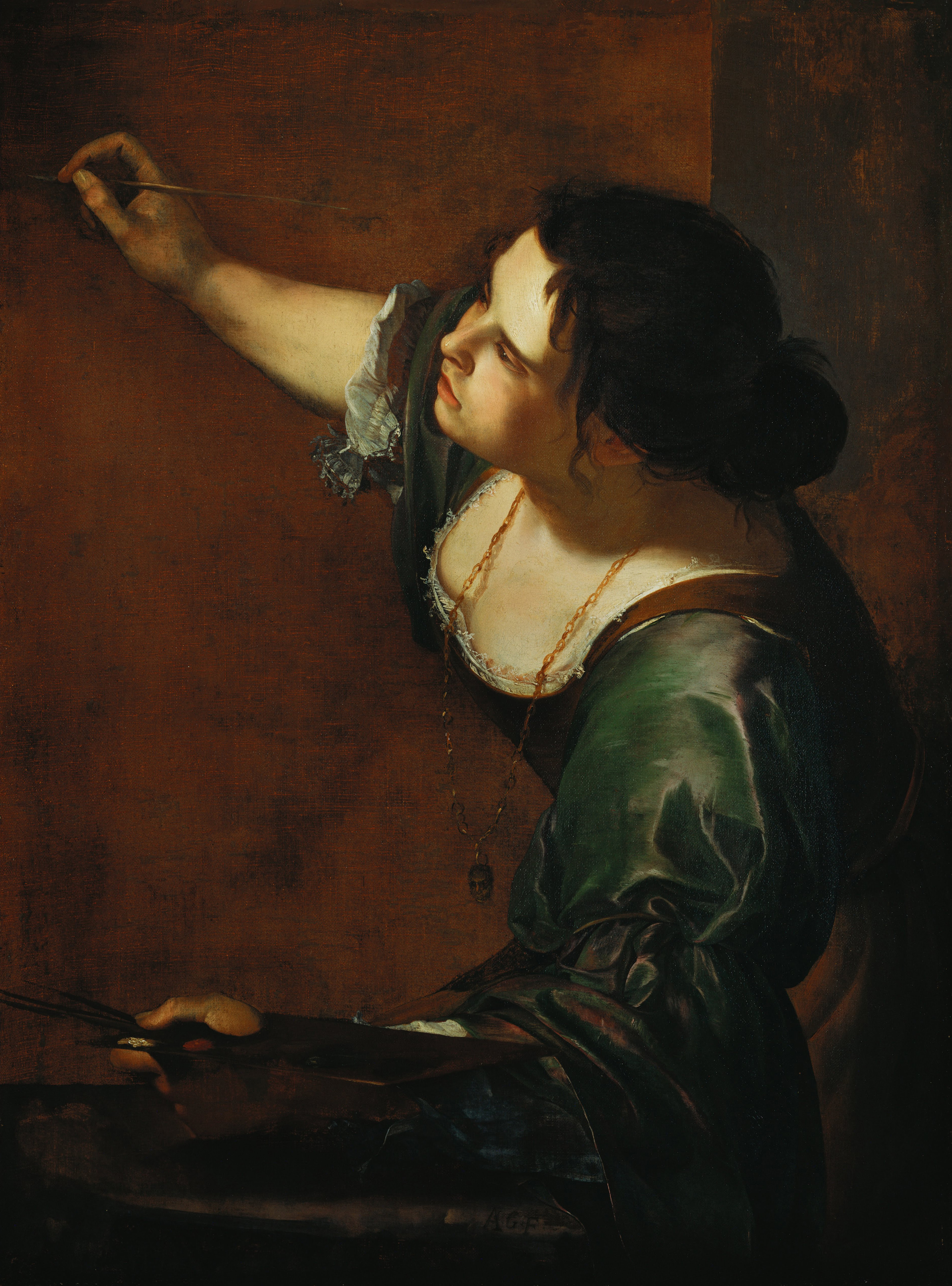
Artemisia Gentileschi, Self-Portrait as the Allegory of Painting, Royal Collection

Many women painters have turned their hand to self-portraiture. While using pictorial techniques and responding to the motivations of the self-portrait in general, the female self-portrait differentiates itself from the male by aspects concerning the physiognomy, the anatomy and the physiology of the subject represented, or related to her psychology.

Self-portraiture, as an artistic genre, has played a fundamental role throughout the history of art, serving as a medium through which artists explore their own identity, inner reflections, and their relationship to the outside world. However, when women portray themselves, self-portraiture takes on additional meanings, often subverting social and artistic norms. For women artists, the practice of self-portraiture has historically represented a territory of claiming space in a predominantly male world, in which their contributions were often ignored or marginalized.

== Place of the female self-portrait ==
The female self-portrait was long considered a minor variety of portraiture. Of the famous collection of self-portraits exhibited in the Vasari Corridor in 1973, only 21 (5%) were by women. In exhibition catalogues and works devoted to self-portraiture published between 1936 and 2016, most often by male authors, the place of the female self-portrait in painting is often less than 5%, or 5 to 10%, sometimes from 10 to less than 20%; however, a more recent work (2021) grants it almost parity.

It therefore appears that, depending on the era and the gender of the authors or curators of the exhibitions, the share of the female self-portrait in painting is evaluated in a very variable way; the recent increase is not the consequence of a renewed activity of the artists concerned, but of a positive re-evaluation, from the 1970s, of the contribution of women in painting. Nevertheless, taking into account the fact that the female self-portrait appeared more than a century after the male self-portrait, and that for a long time there were fewer female artists, it would seem quite reasonable to place the proportion at a maximum of 15–20%. This figure is unlikely to change much in the future, as the self-portrait in painting has declined sharply during the 20th century, marked by new pictorial movements leading to what has been called the "disappearance of the figure", or "crisis of mimetic representation", and by the rise of photography and then digital art.

== Artists ==
=== The celebrities ===
The artists who appear in the "Top 5" of the works referenced above are Sofonisba Anguissola, Artemisia Gentileschi, Frida Kahlo, Angelica Kauffmann and Élisabeth Vigée Le Brun, followed by Rosalba Carriera, Lavinia Fontana, Paula Modersohn-Becker, Helene Schjerfbeck and Suzanne Valadon. Although they produced very few self-portraits, the Impressionists Berthe Morisot and Mary Cassatt are often cited, as well as the pioneering Catharina van Hemessen and the iconic Tamara de Lempicka.

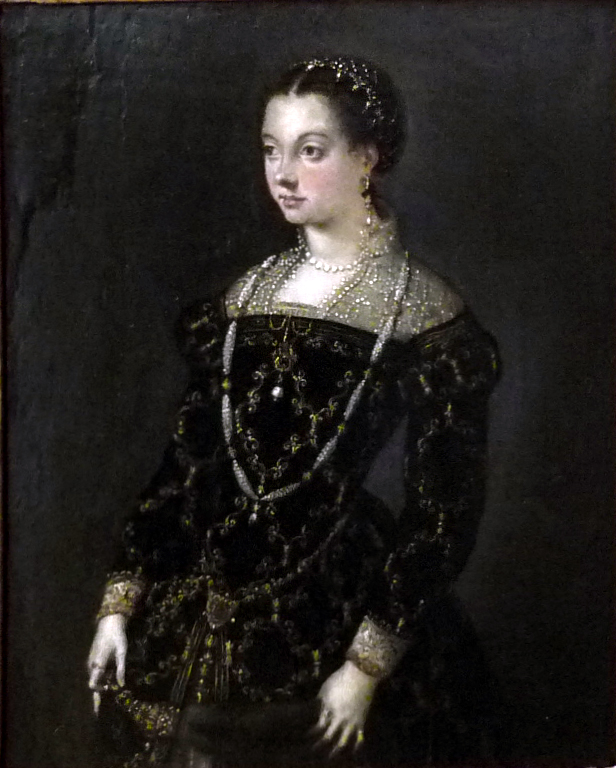
Sofonisba Anguissola

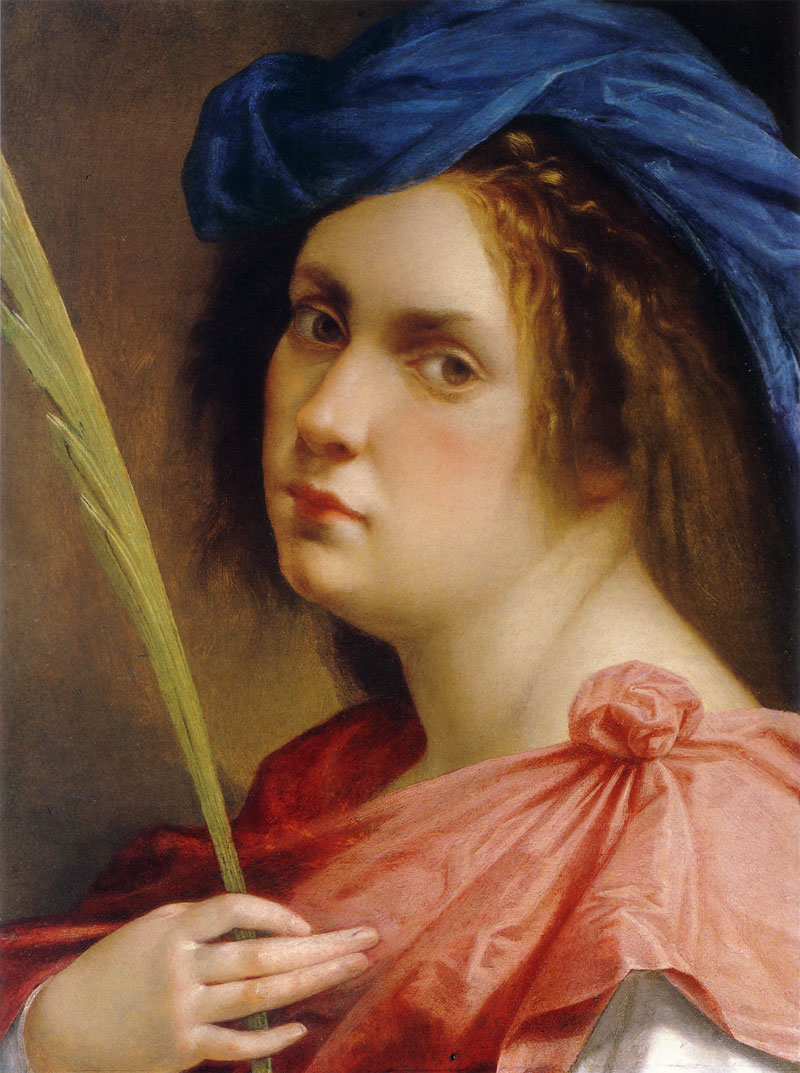
Artemisia Gentileschi

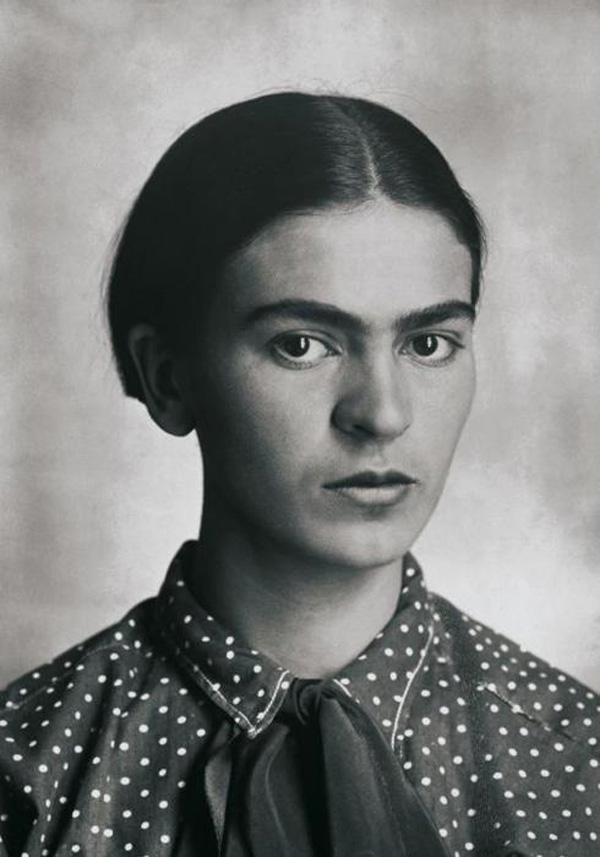
Frida Kahlo

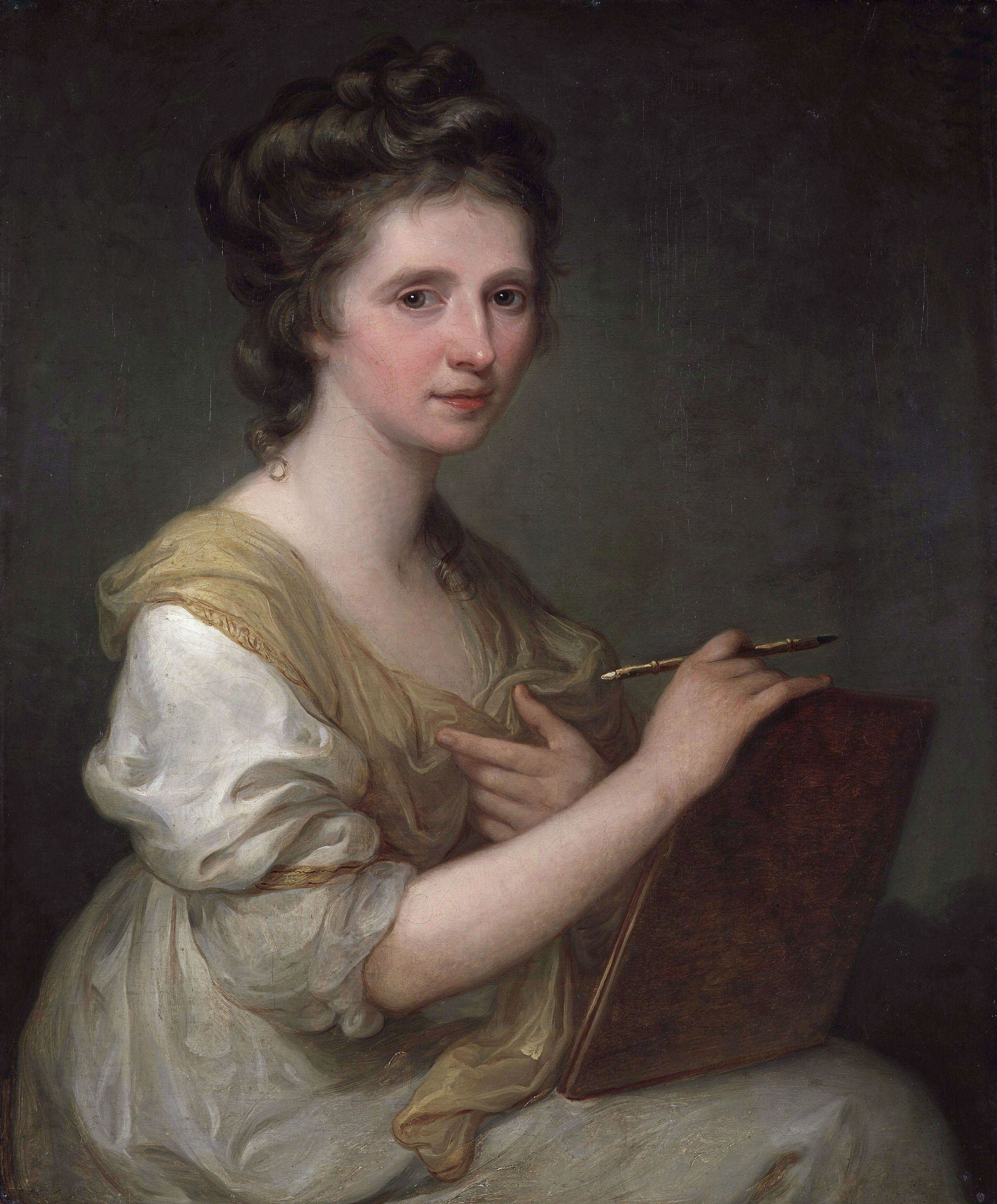
Angelica Kauffman

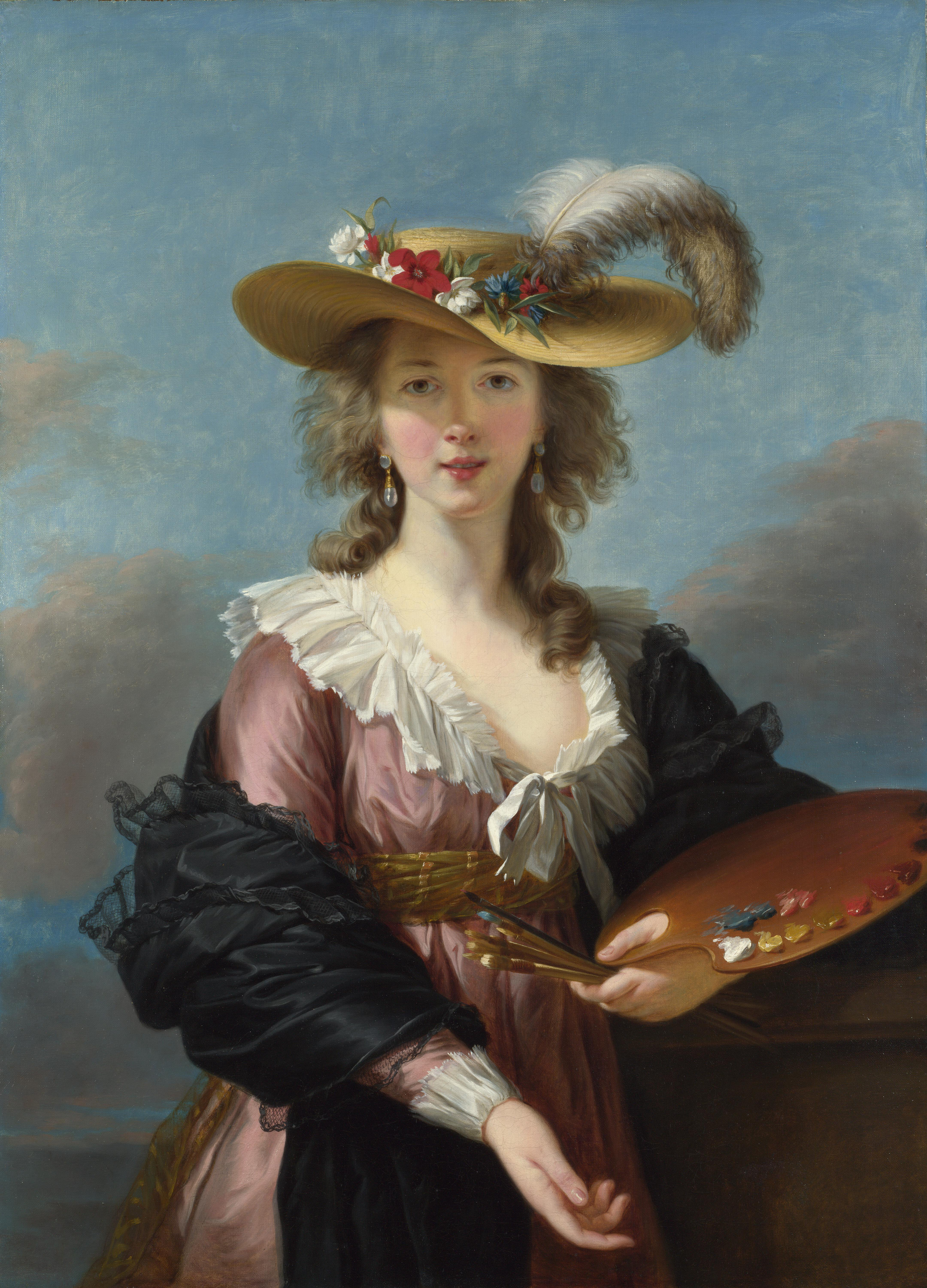
Élisabeth Vigée Le Brun
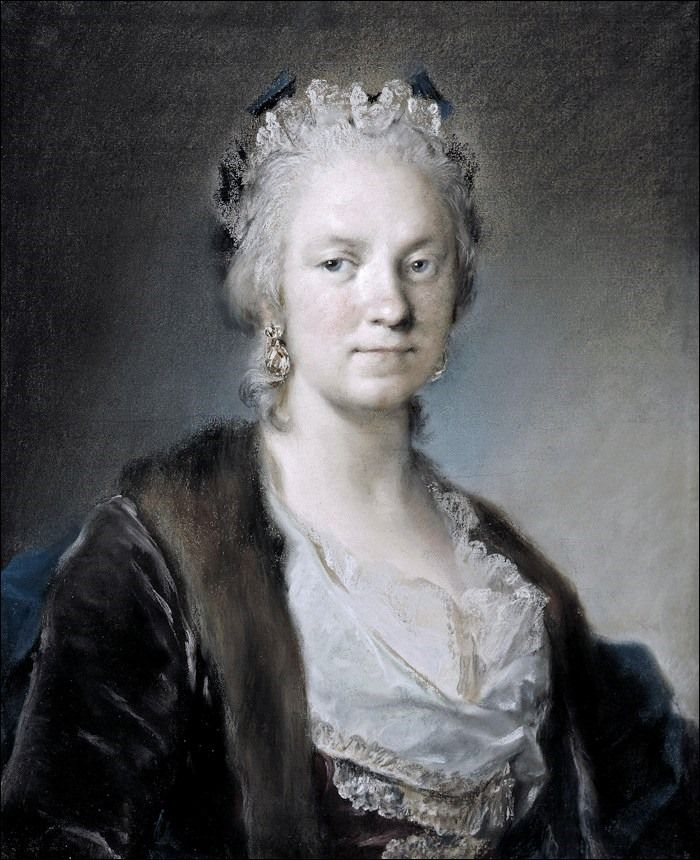
Rosalba Carriera

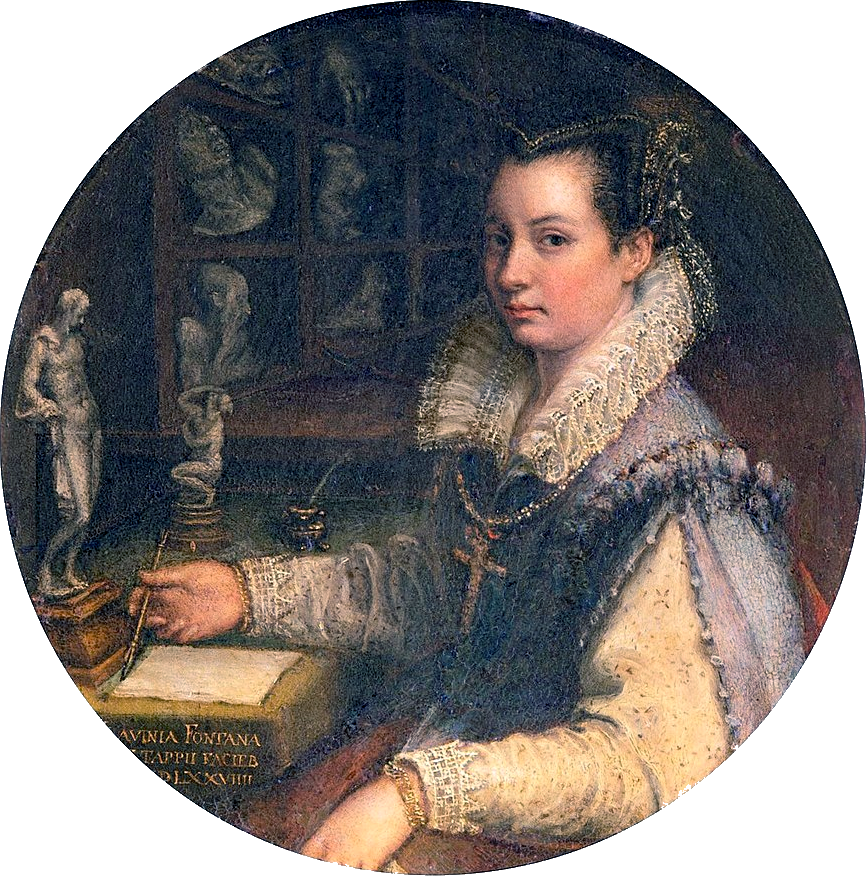
Lavinia Fontana

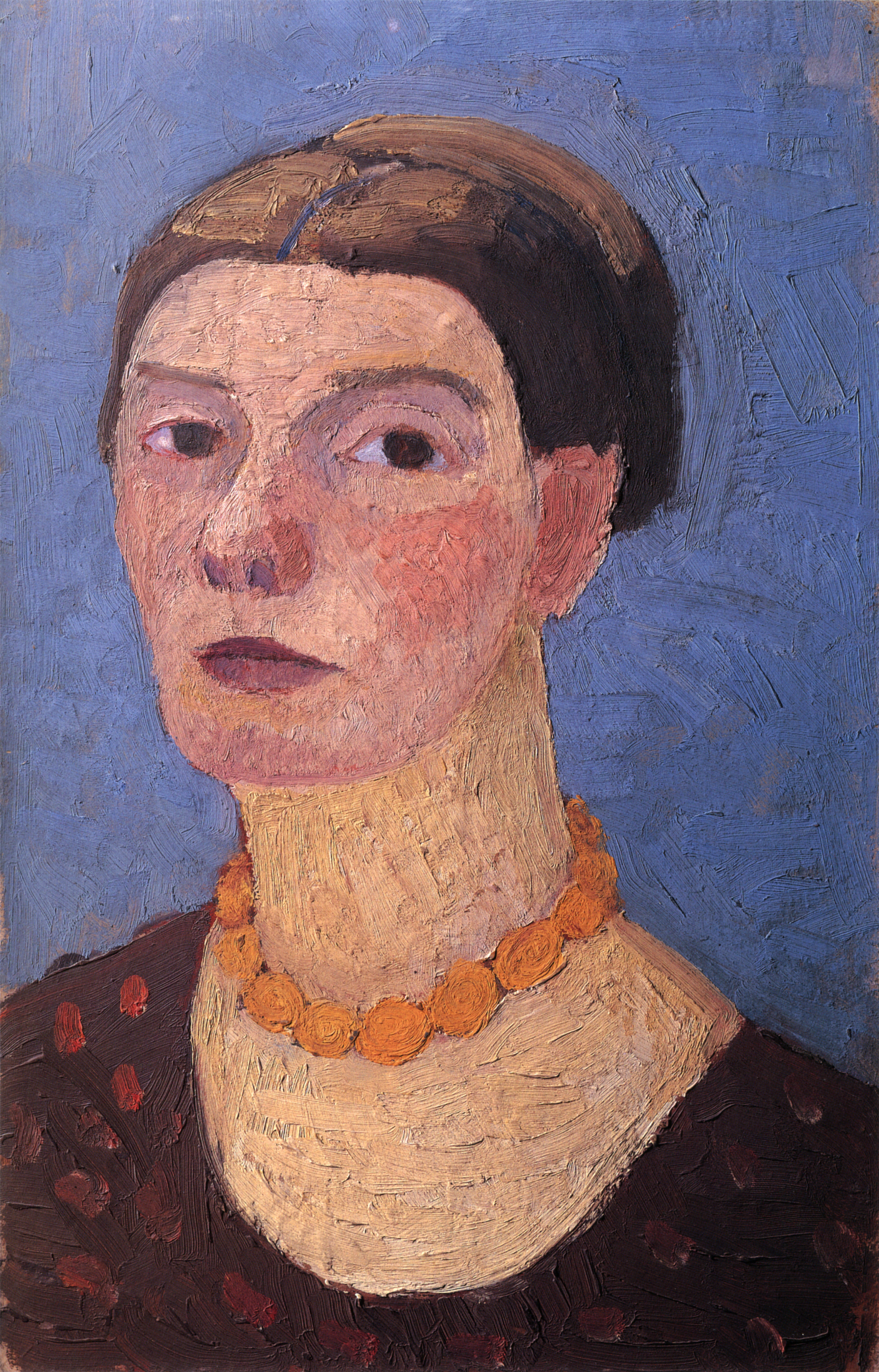
Paula Modersohn-Becker

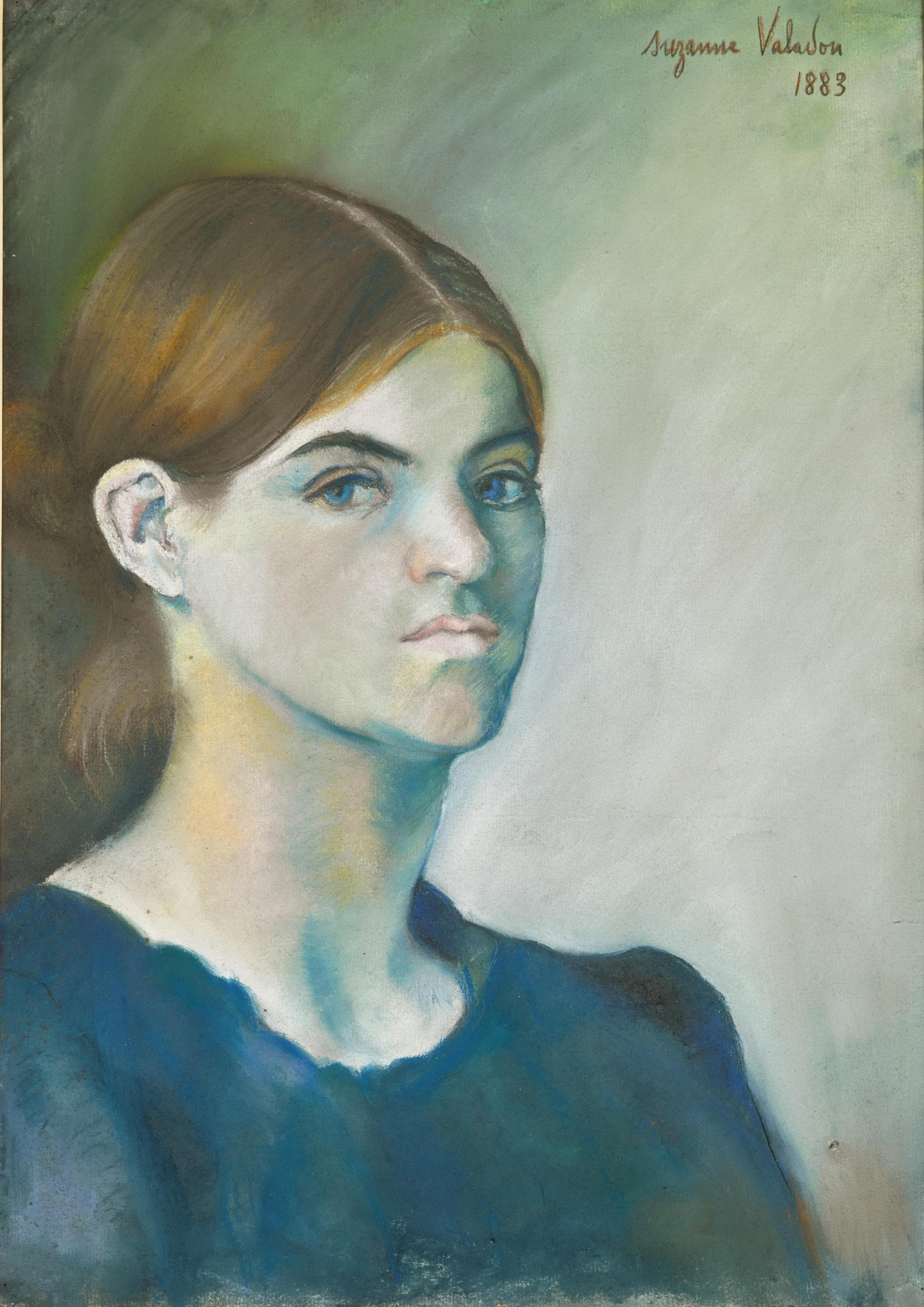
Suzanne Valadon

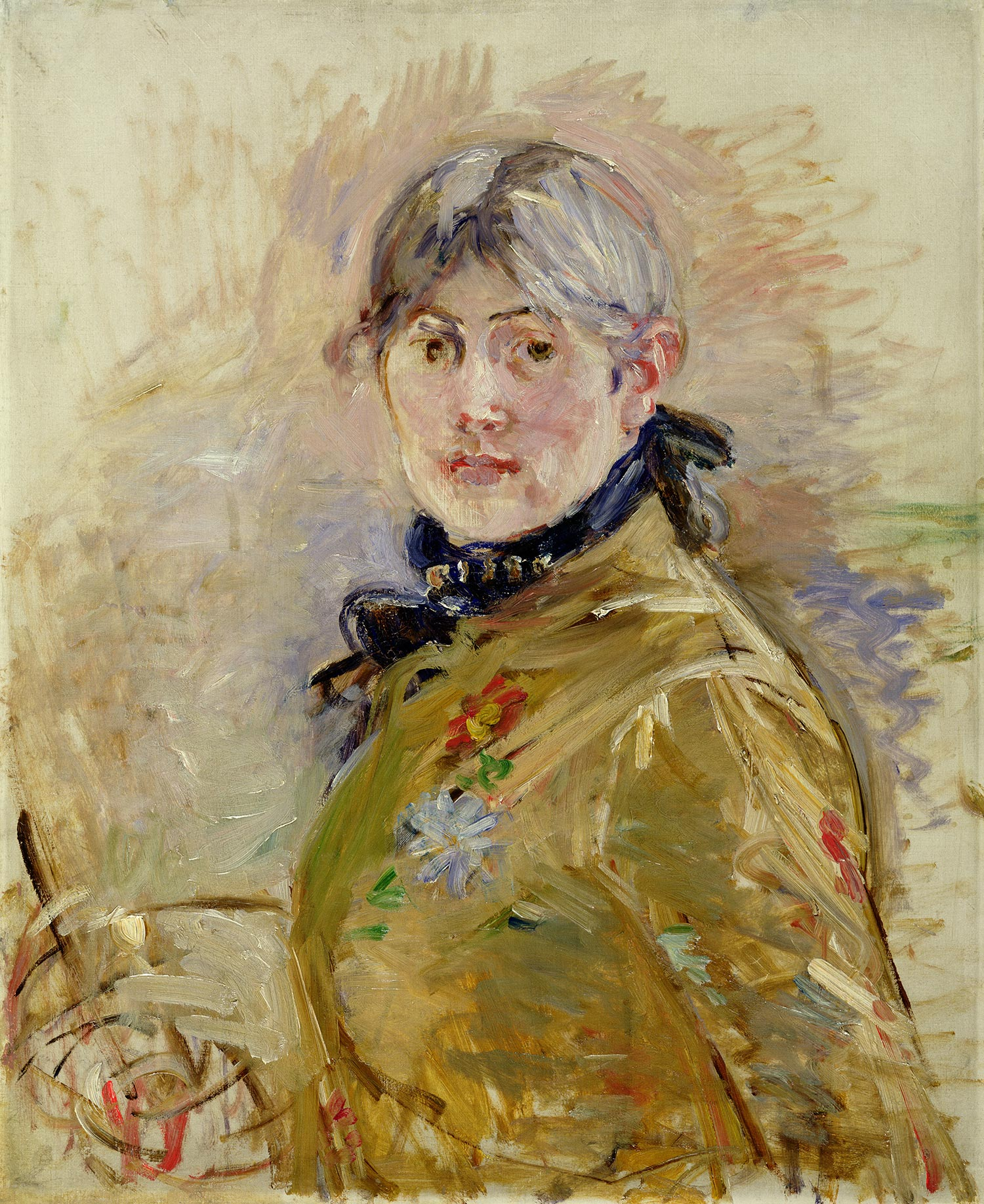
Berthe Morisot

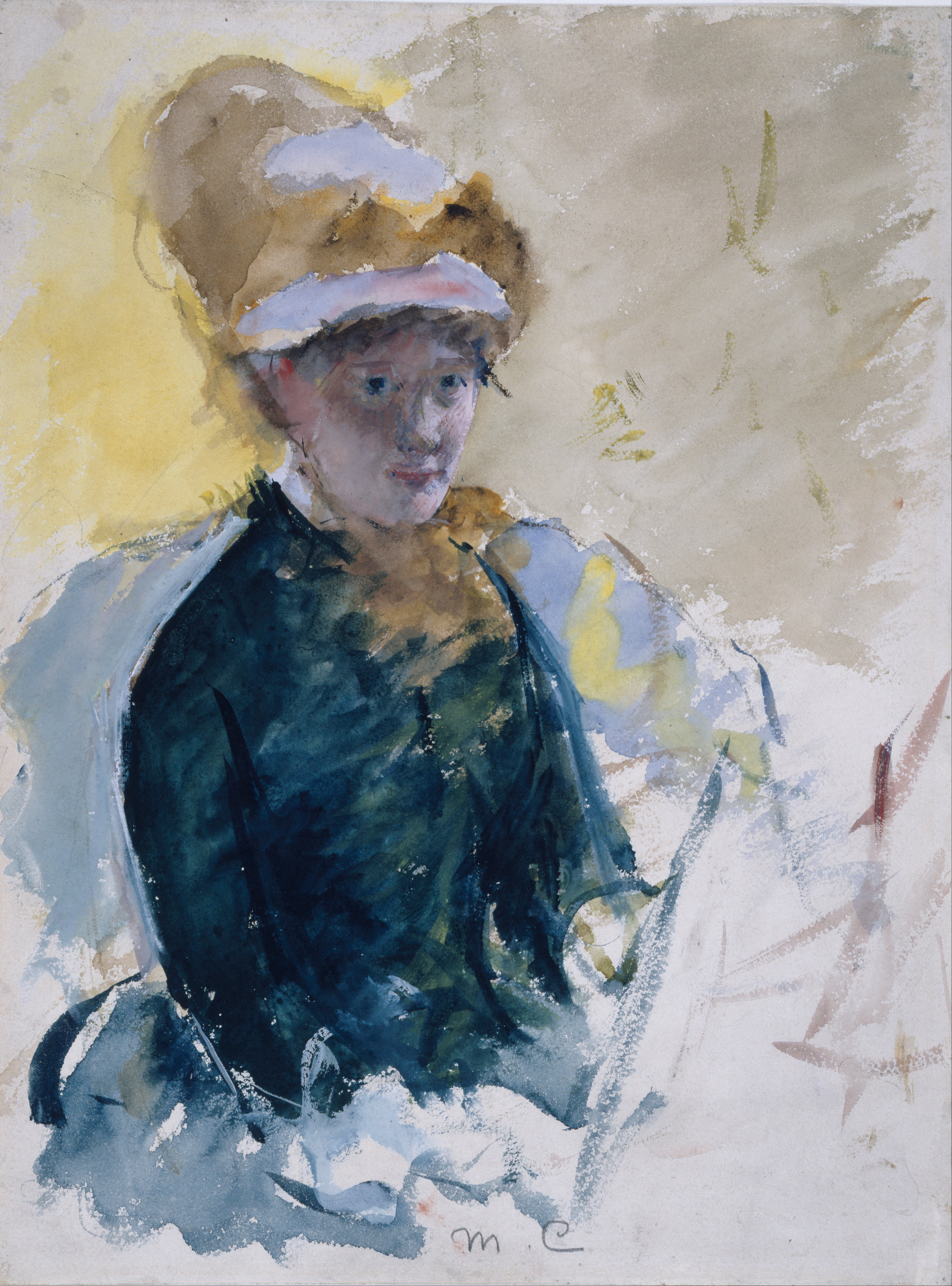
Mary Cassatt

=== Aristocrats ===
A singularity of the female self-portrait is to find artists from princely, royal and imperial families, mainly in the 17th and 18th centuries; while the sons of noble families are destined for war or the clergy, the daughters received a thorough artistic education in music, literature and fine arts; equipped with this background, some became accomplished painters. These include Ulrika Eleonora of Denmark, Anne of Hanover, Countess Lulu von Thürheim, Leonor de Almeida Portugal, Marquise of Alorna, Princess Caroline Louise of Hesse-Darmstadt, Princess Charlotte Bonaparte, Ernestine Charlotte of Nassau-Schaumburg, who portrayed herself as Saint Casilda, Elisabeth Christine of Brunswick-Wolfenbüttel-Bevern as a gardener, Lady Diana Beauclerk as Terpsichore, Louise Hollandine of the Palatinate as an allegory of painting, Amalia Wilhelmina von Königsmarck and Duchess Maria Antonia of Bavaria with palette and brushes.

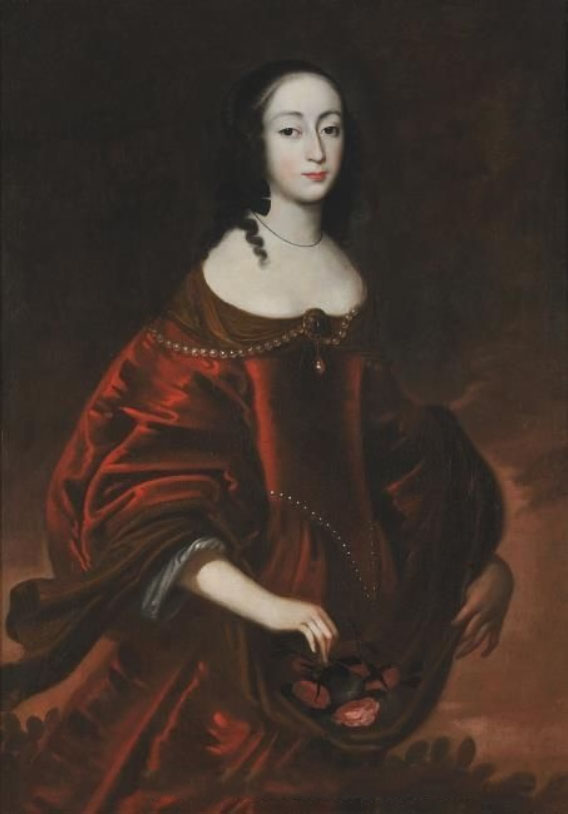
Ernestine Charlotte of Nassau-Schaumburg, c. 1645

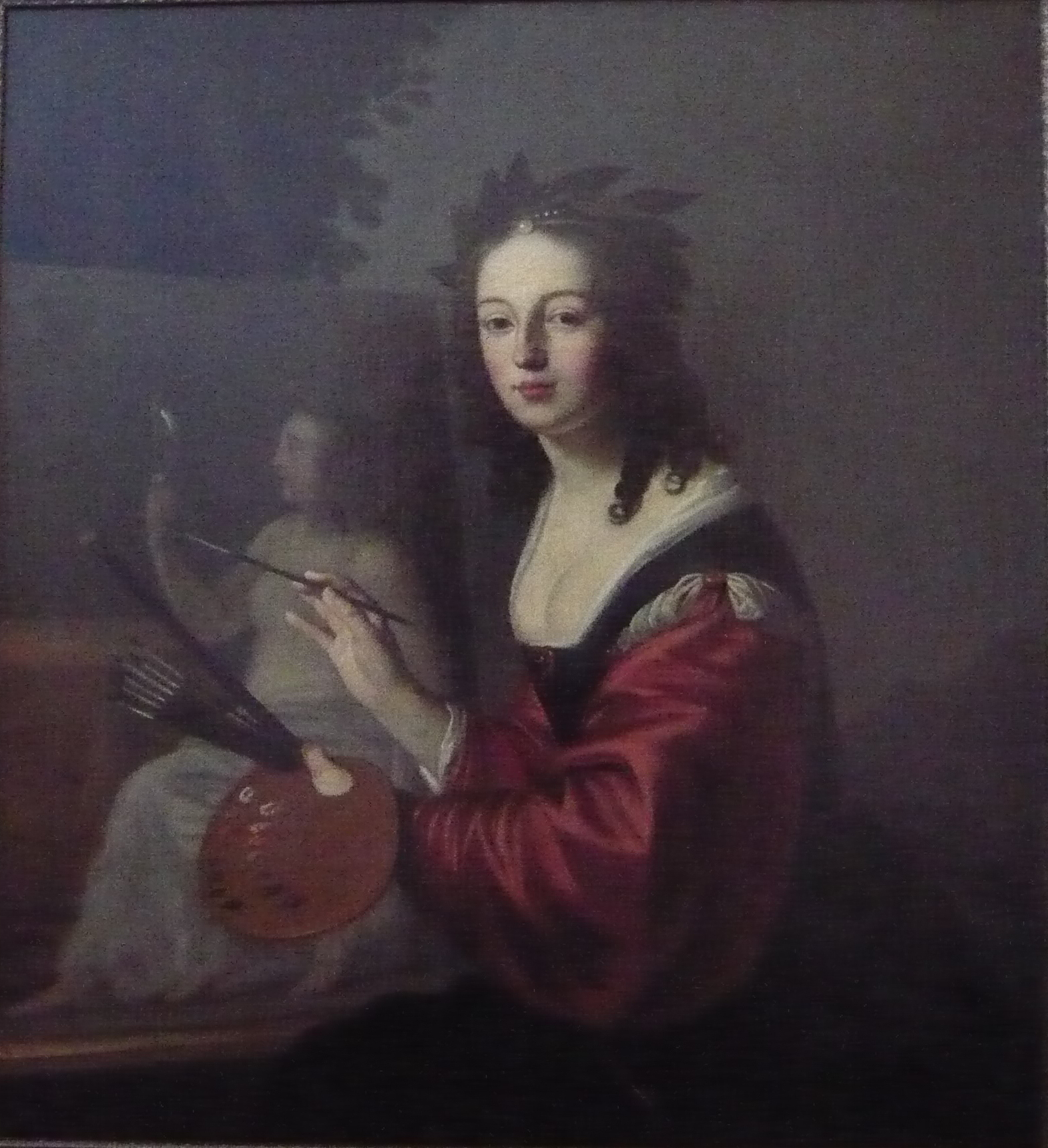
Louise Hollandine of the Palatinate, c. 1675

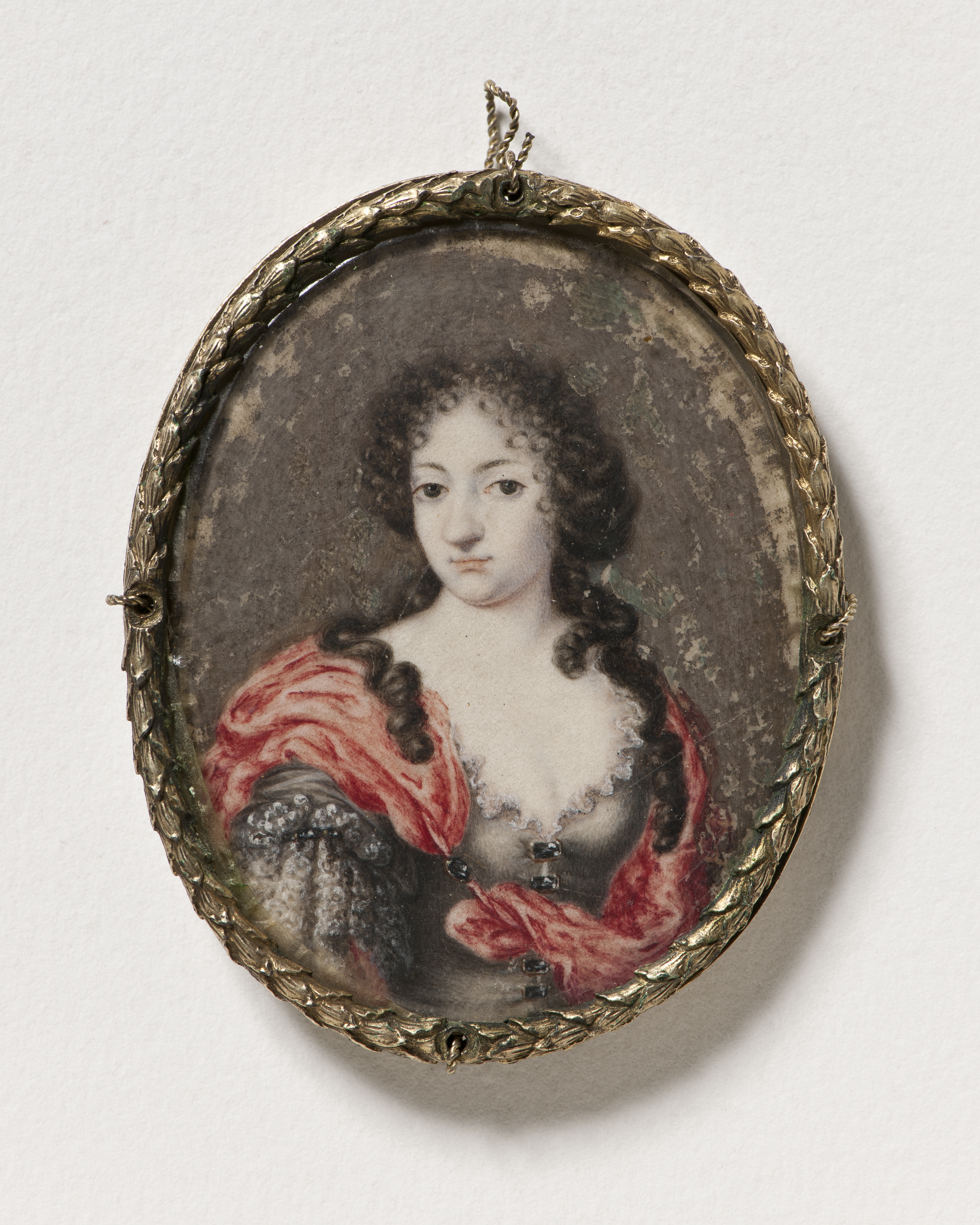
Ulrika Eleonora of Denmark [n.d.]

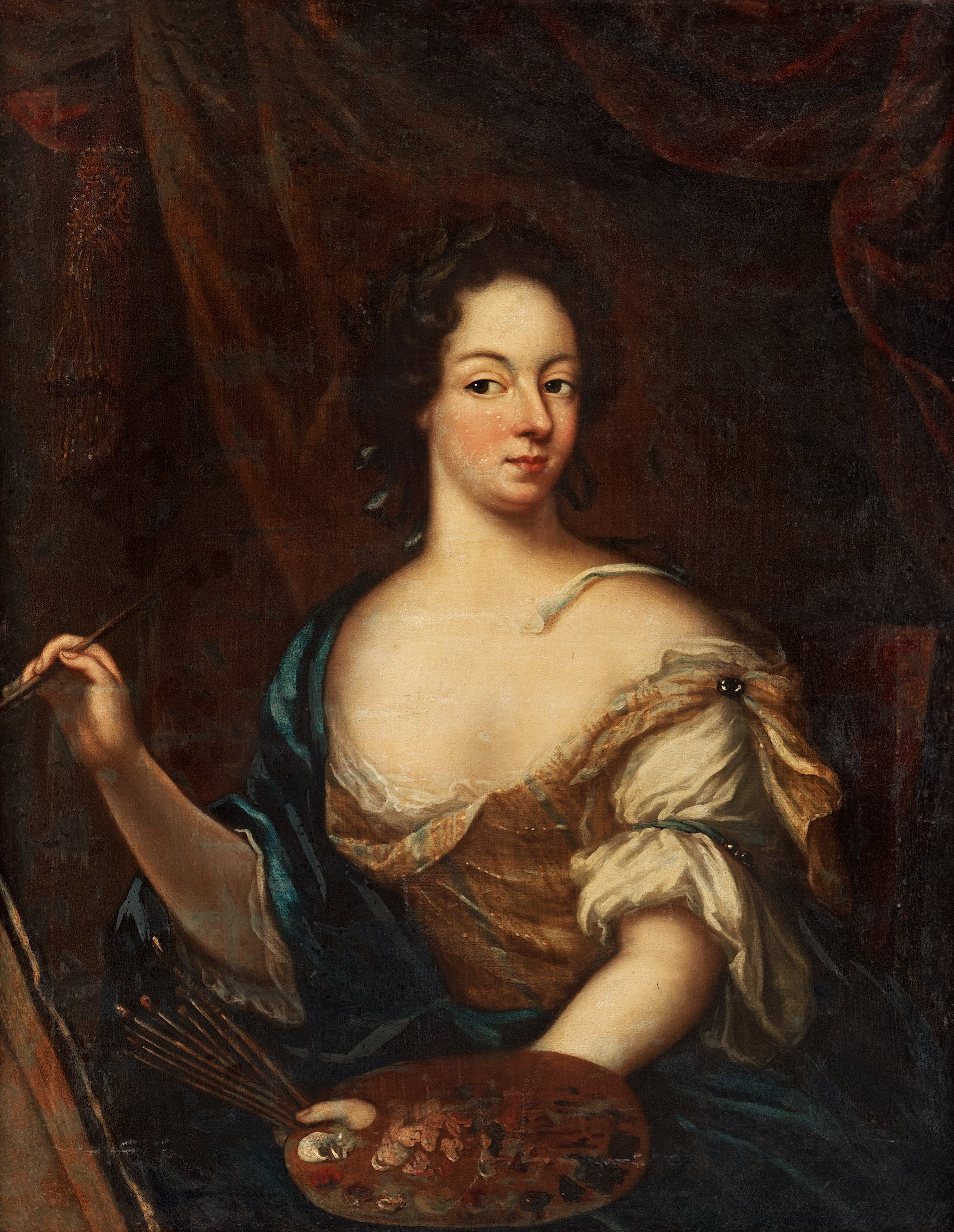
Amalia Wilhelmina von Königsmarck, 1687

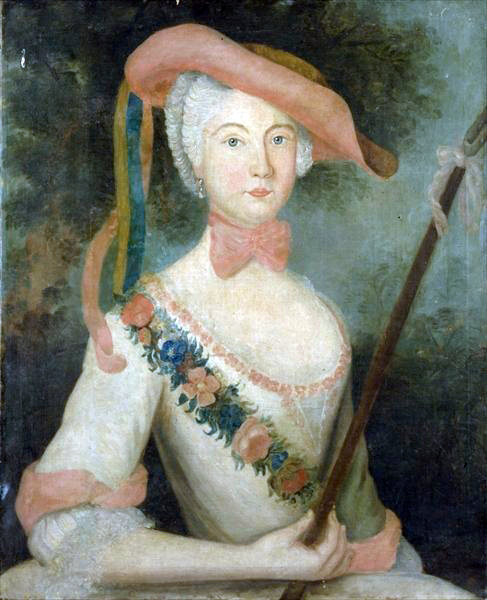
Elisabeth Christine of Brunswick-Wolfenbüttel-Bevern
c. 1739
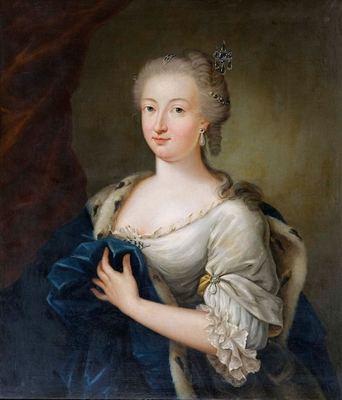
Anne of Hanover
1740

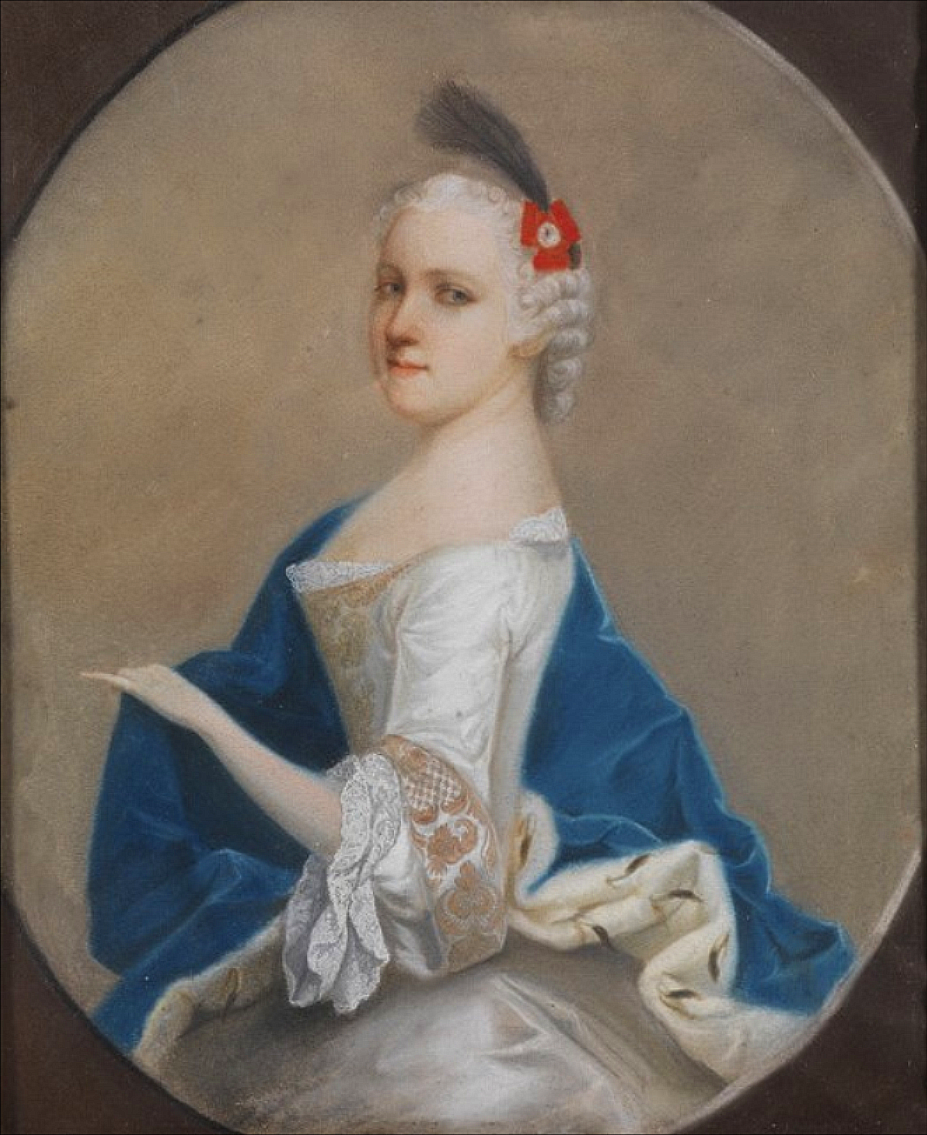
Princess Caroline Louise of Hesse-Darmstadt
c. 1745

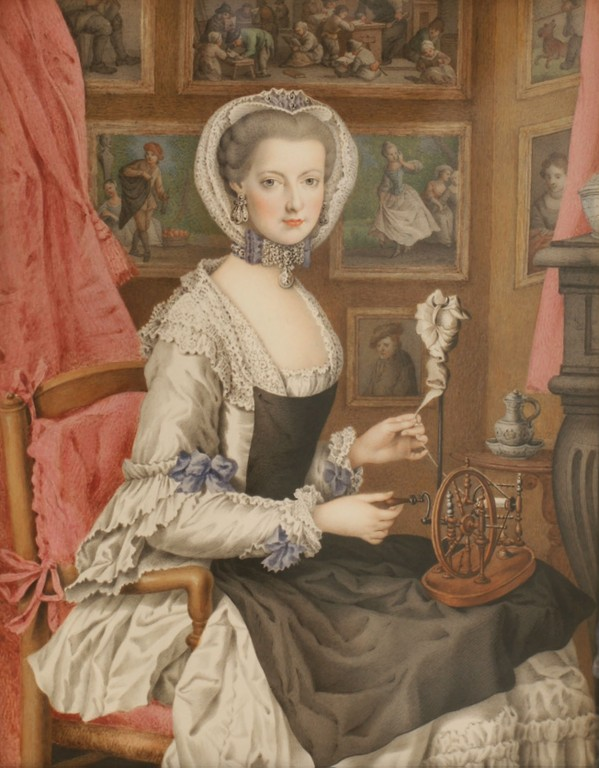
Maria Christina, Duchess of Teschen, 1765

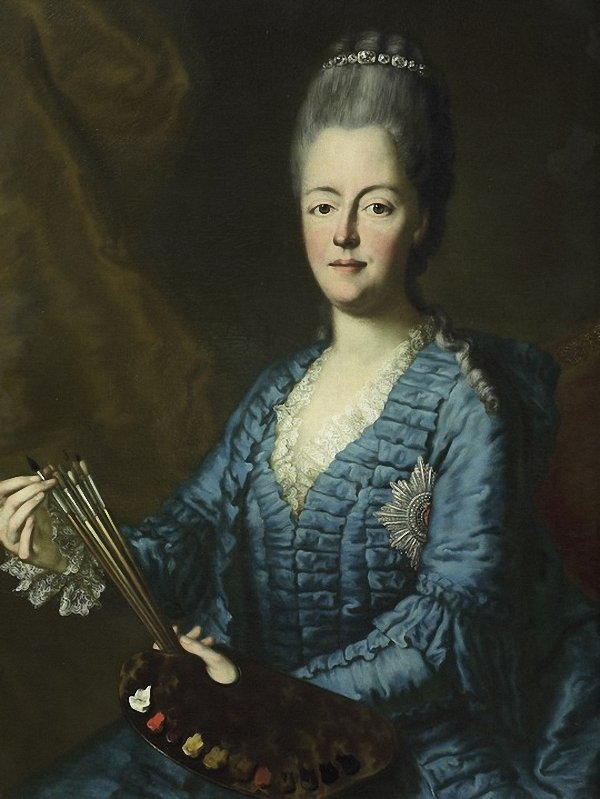
Duchess Maria Antonia of Bavaria, c. 1772

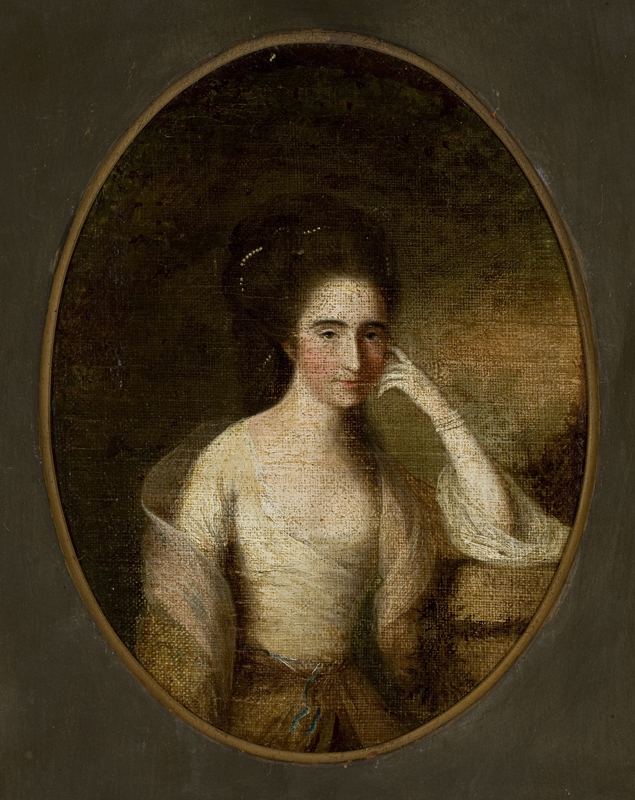
Leonor de Almeida Portugal, Marquise of Alorna, c. 1788

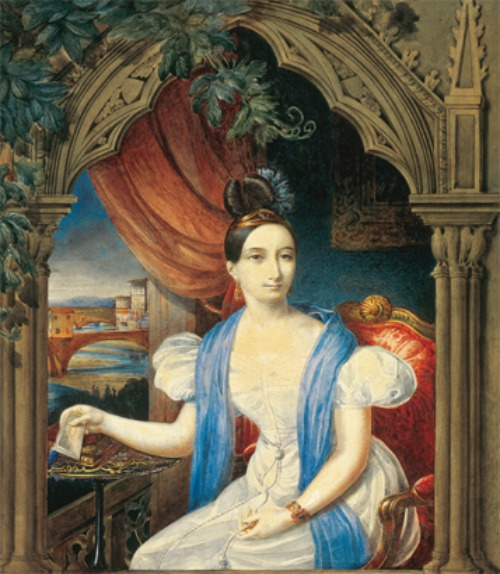
Charlotte Bonaparte
1834

=== Extreme ages ===
According to James Hall, Omar Calabrese, Whitney Chadwick or Martine Lacas, the self-portrait has often been a genre of young painters.

There are, however, notable exceptions. The longer life expectancy of women once the possible complications of childbirth have passed lead to the creation of female self-portraits at very advanced ages. While among men, Titian (78 years), Ingres (79 years), Claude Monet (77 years), Pierre Bonnard (78 years), Edvard Munch (80 years) and especially Picasso (90 years) are exceptions, among women there are many septuagenarians, the first being Sofonisba Anguissola, 78 years in 1610, author of about fifteen self-portraits over a period of sixty-five years, and several octogenarians; Helene Schjerfbeck made about forty self-portraits, half of them in the two years preceding her death at the age of 83. When Rosalba Carriera depicted herself at the age of 71 as the muse of Tragedy – with a mask that was more melancholic than tragic – her personal tragedy was a progressive loss of vision, which would be operated on unsuccessfully three years later, leading to complete blindness. Among the painters at a very advanced age are Johanne Mathilde Dietrichson, aged 81 in 1918, Susan Macdowell Eakins, aged 84 in 1935, Mina Carlson-Bredberg, aged 81 in 1938, Vanessa Bell, aged 80 and 81 in 1959 and 1960; also in 1960, Charlotte Berend-Corinth, aged 80, and Émilie Charmy, aged 82; later, Lotte Laserstein aged 82 and 85, Marie Vorobieff aged 85 in 1977. After limiting her self-portraits to the body, Joan Semmel painted her face as an elderly woman in the series Heads in 2008. Adriana Pincherle painted herself in front of her easel aged 85, and, at 87, as a very elegant lady. Alice Neel, in 1980, painted a nude portrait of herself at the age of 80: "at least it shows a certain revolt against everything decent", she declared. Eve Drewelowe made her self-portrait entitled "Nonconformist" at the age of 85 (1984). Maria Lassnig, who painted herself nude on numerous occasions for over seventy years, produced her last self-portraits at the ages of 86 and 94, a year before her death in 2013 and/or in her mature years.

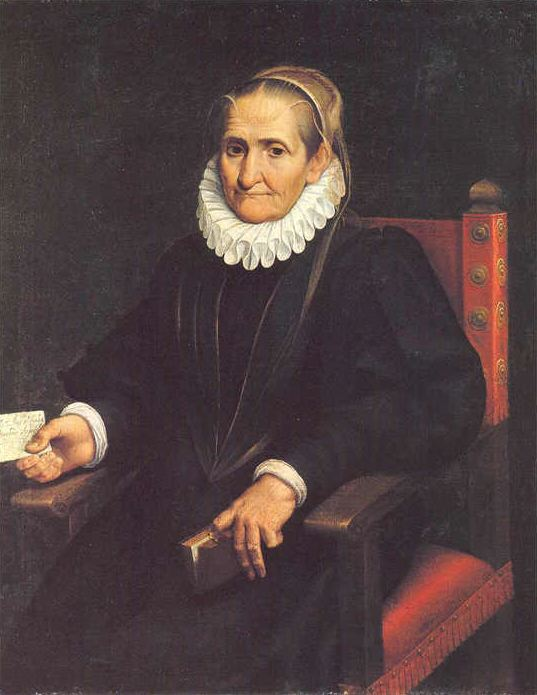
Sofonisba Anguissola
age 78

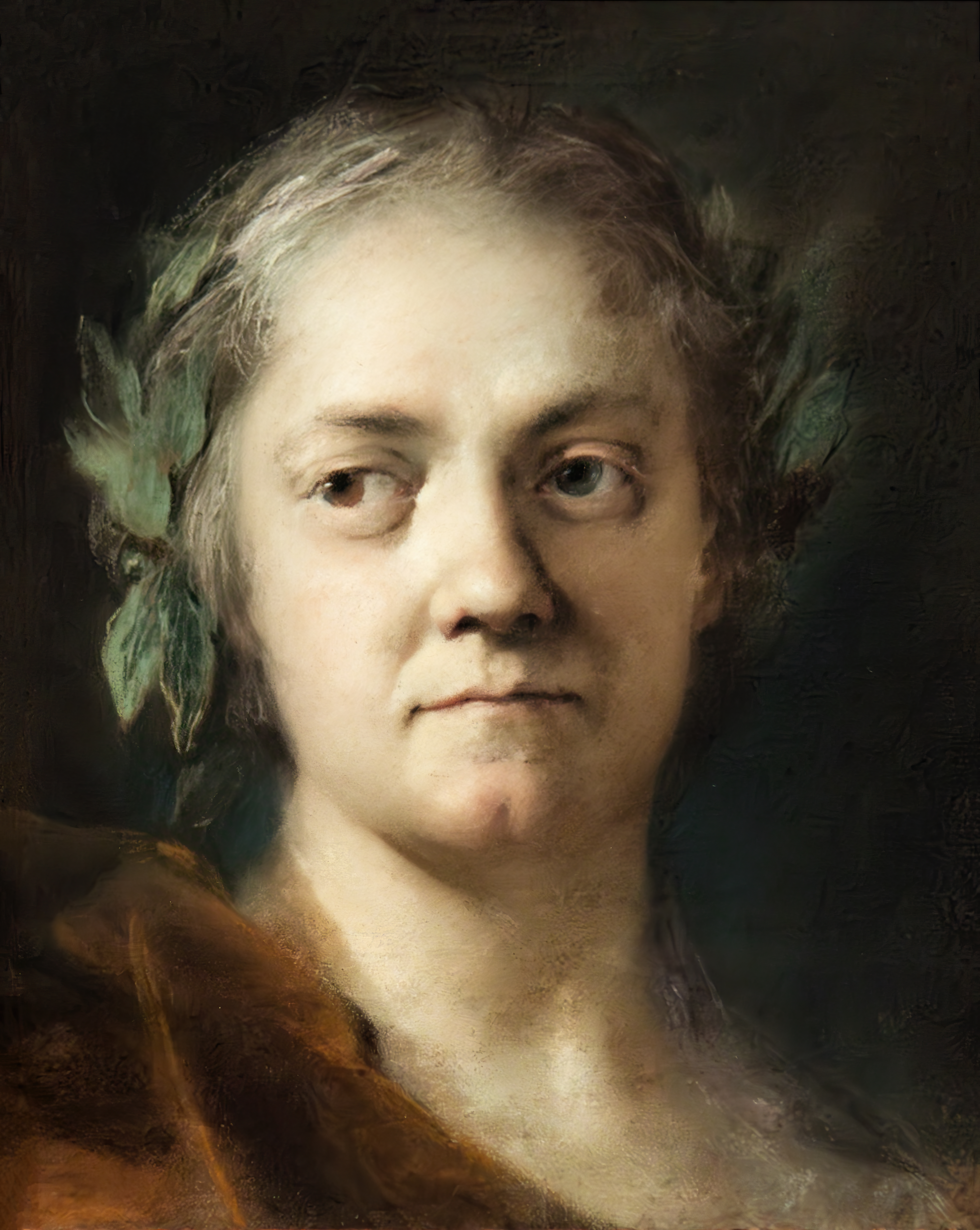
Rosalba Carriera
age 71

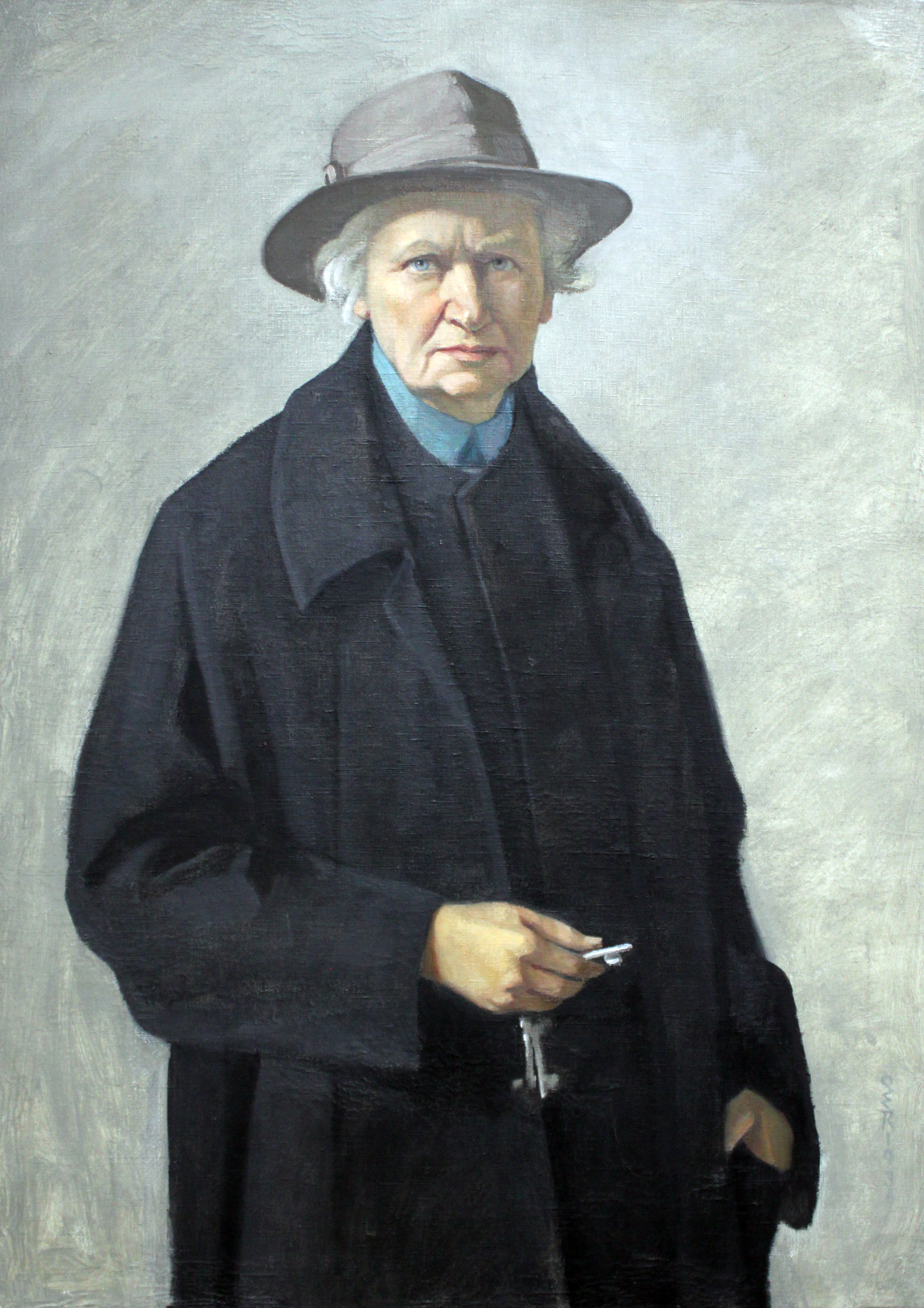
Ottilie Roederstein
age 77

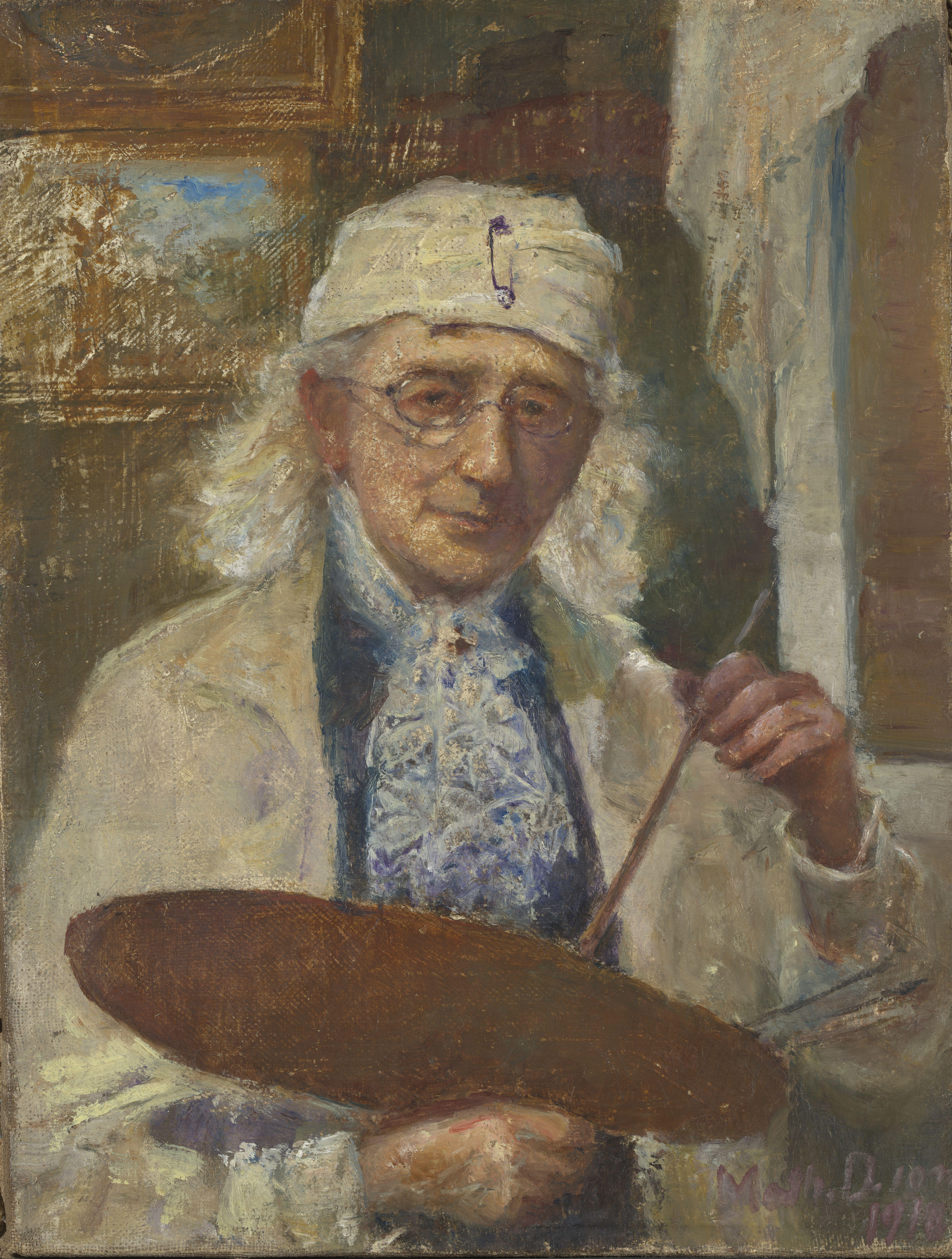
Johanne Mathilde Dietrichson
age 81

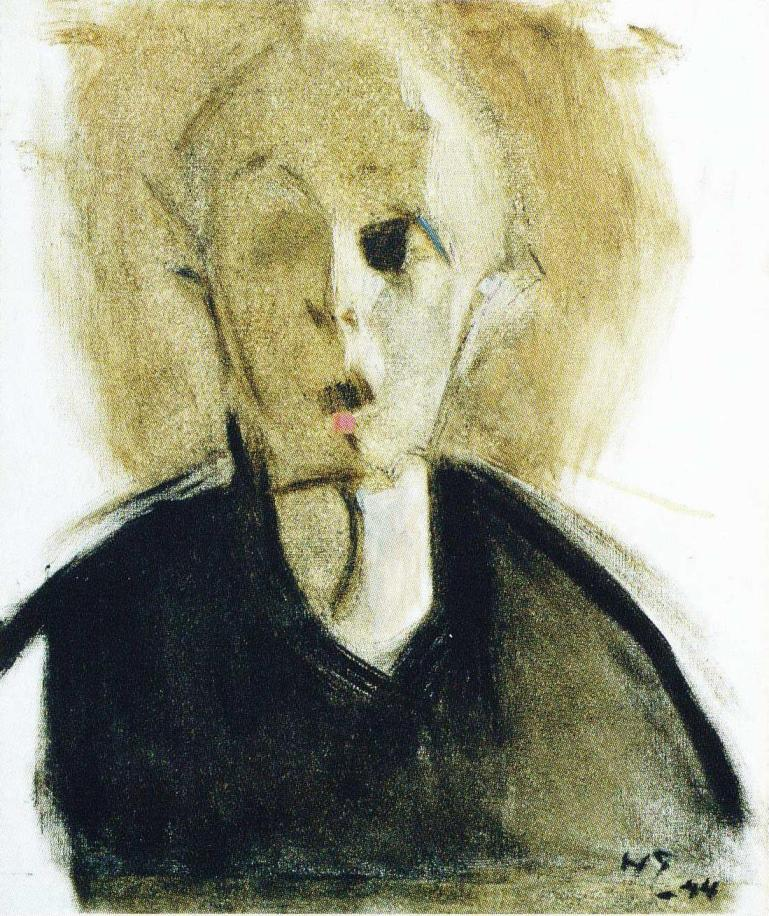
Helene Schjerfbeck
age 82

At the other extreme, we have some female self-portraits produced very early, such as the examples of the artists below:

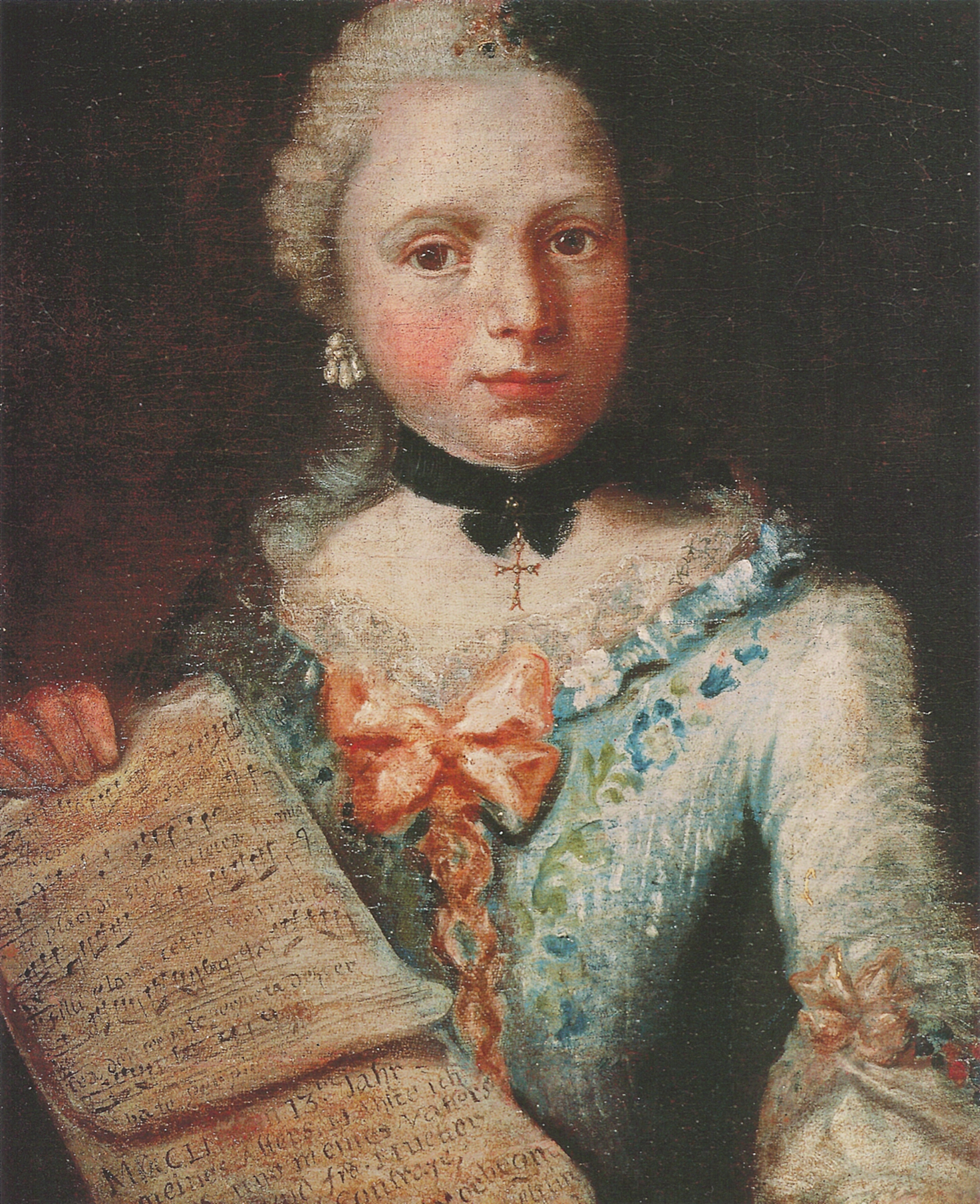
Angelica Kauffmann
age 11, 1753

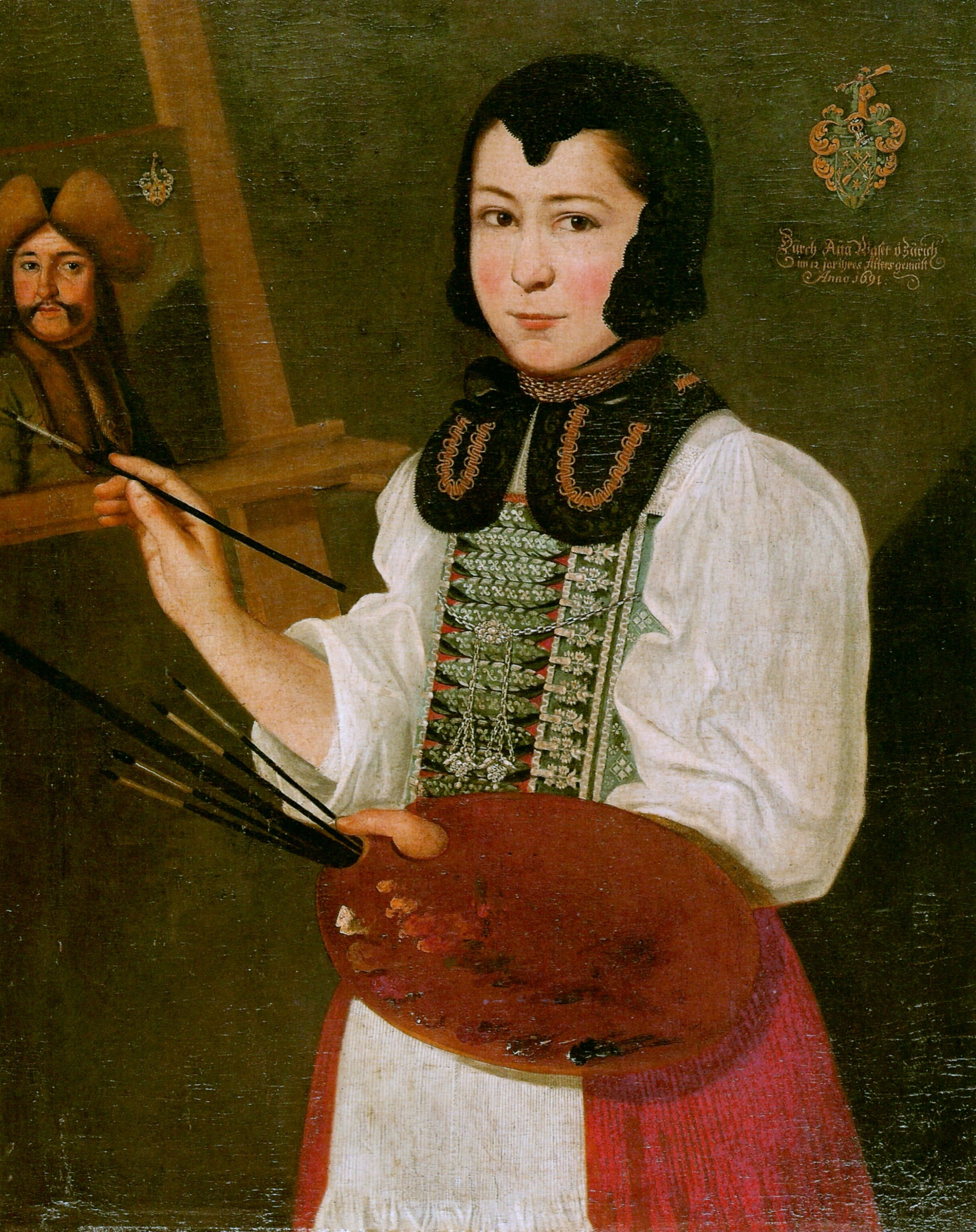
Anna Waser
age 12, 1691

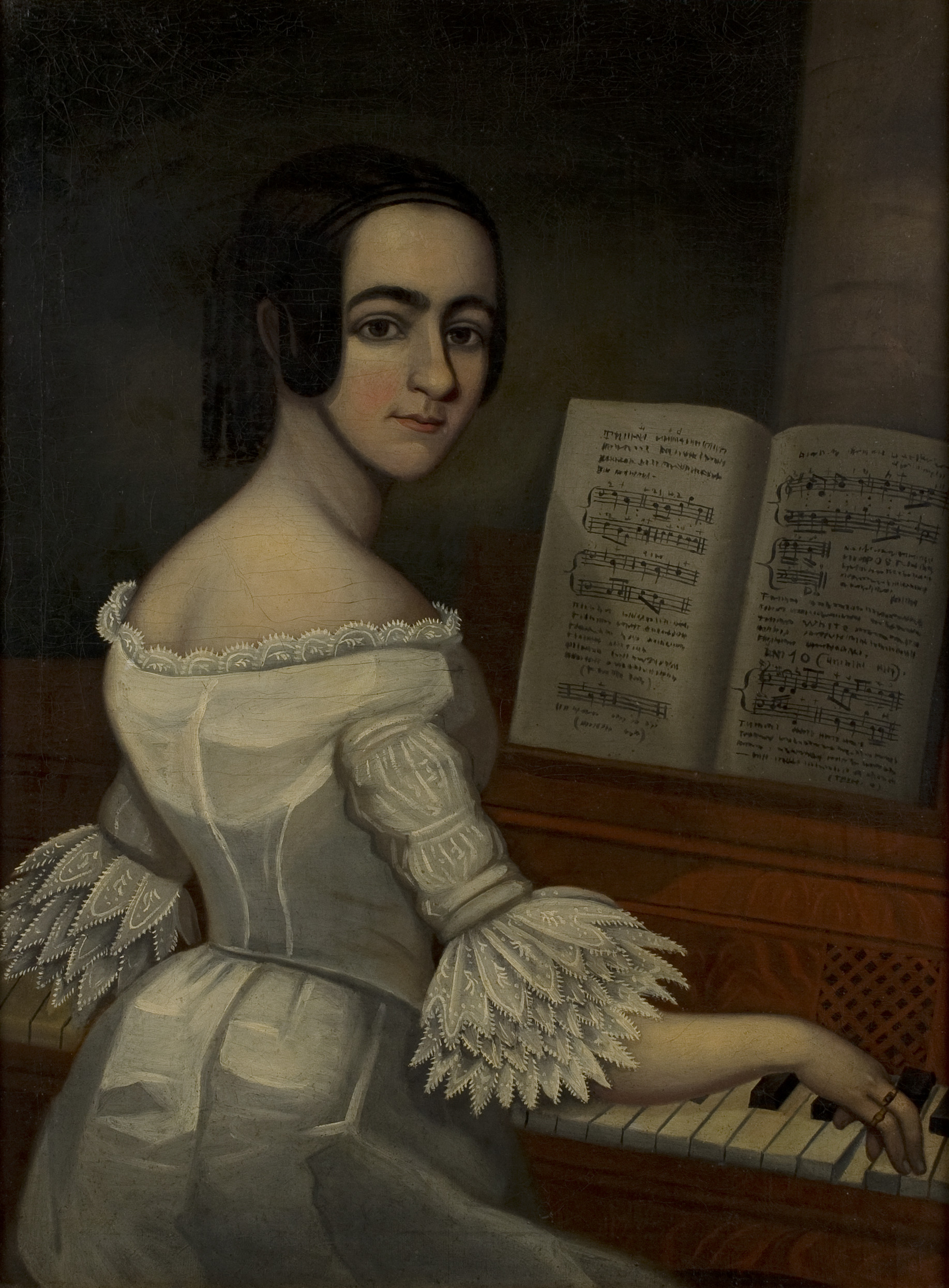
Lucinda Redmon Orear
age 12, 1835

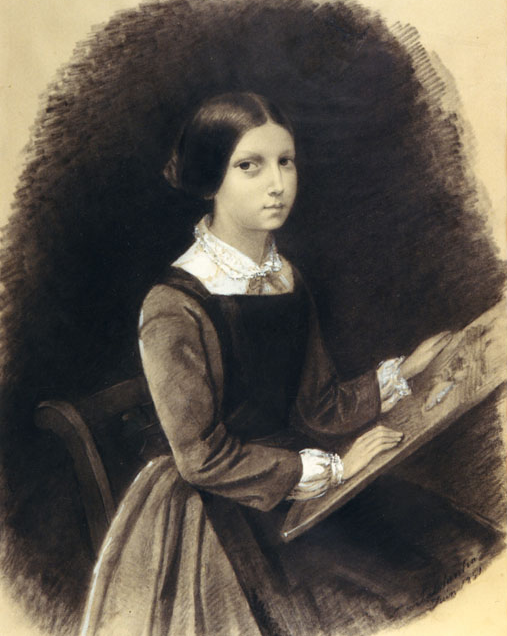
Teresa de Saldanha
age 13, 1851

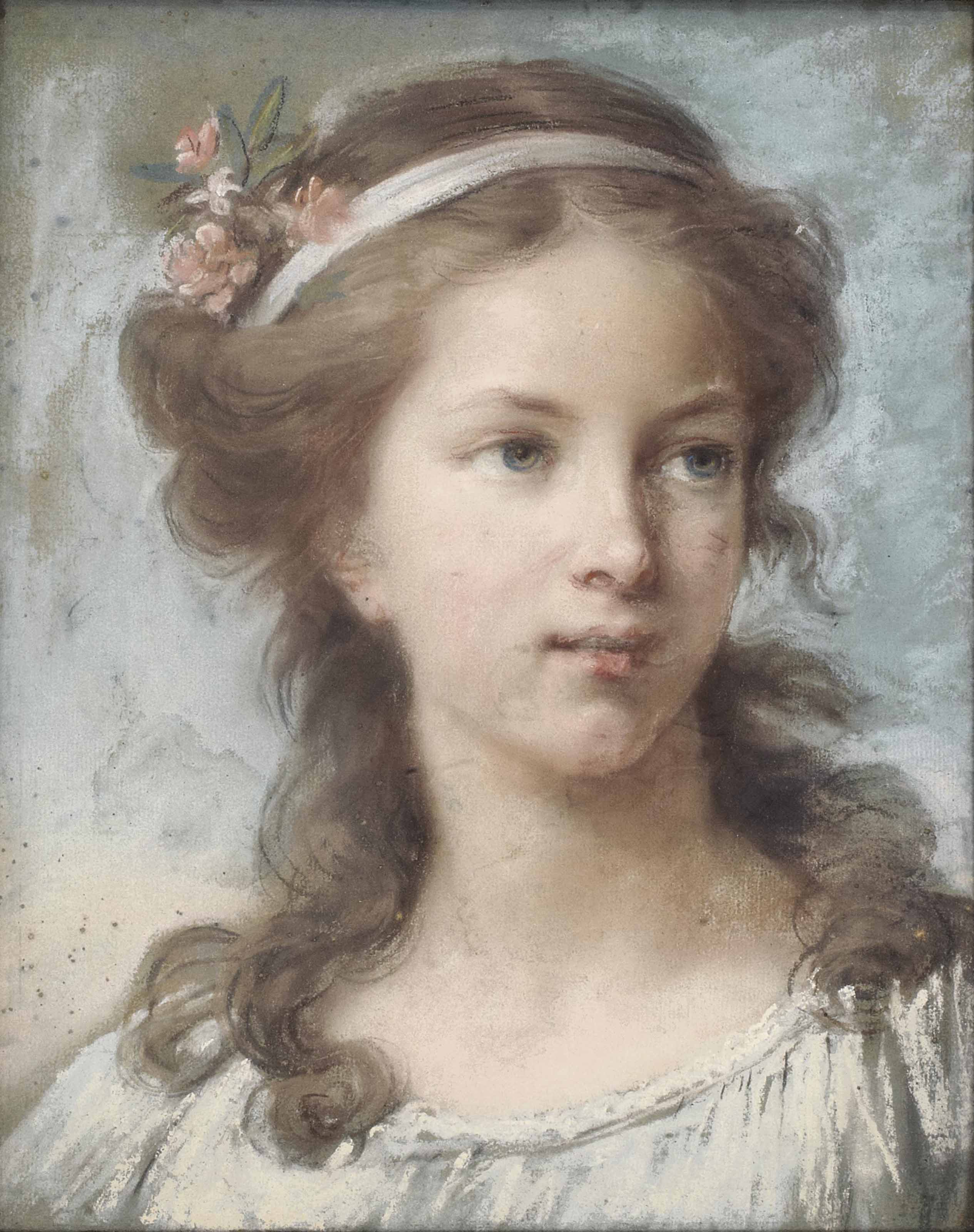
Élisabeth Vigée Le Brun
age 16, 1771

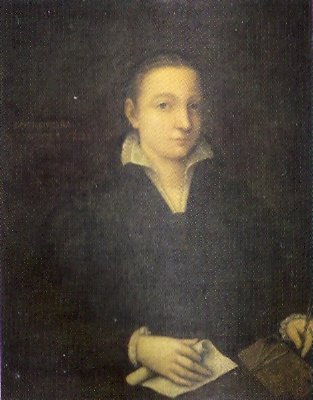
Sofonisba Anguissola
age 18, c.1550

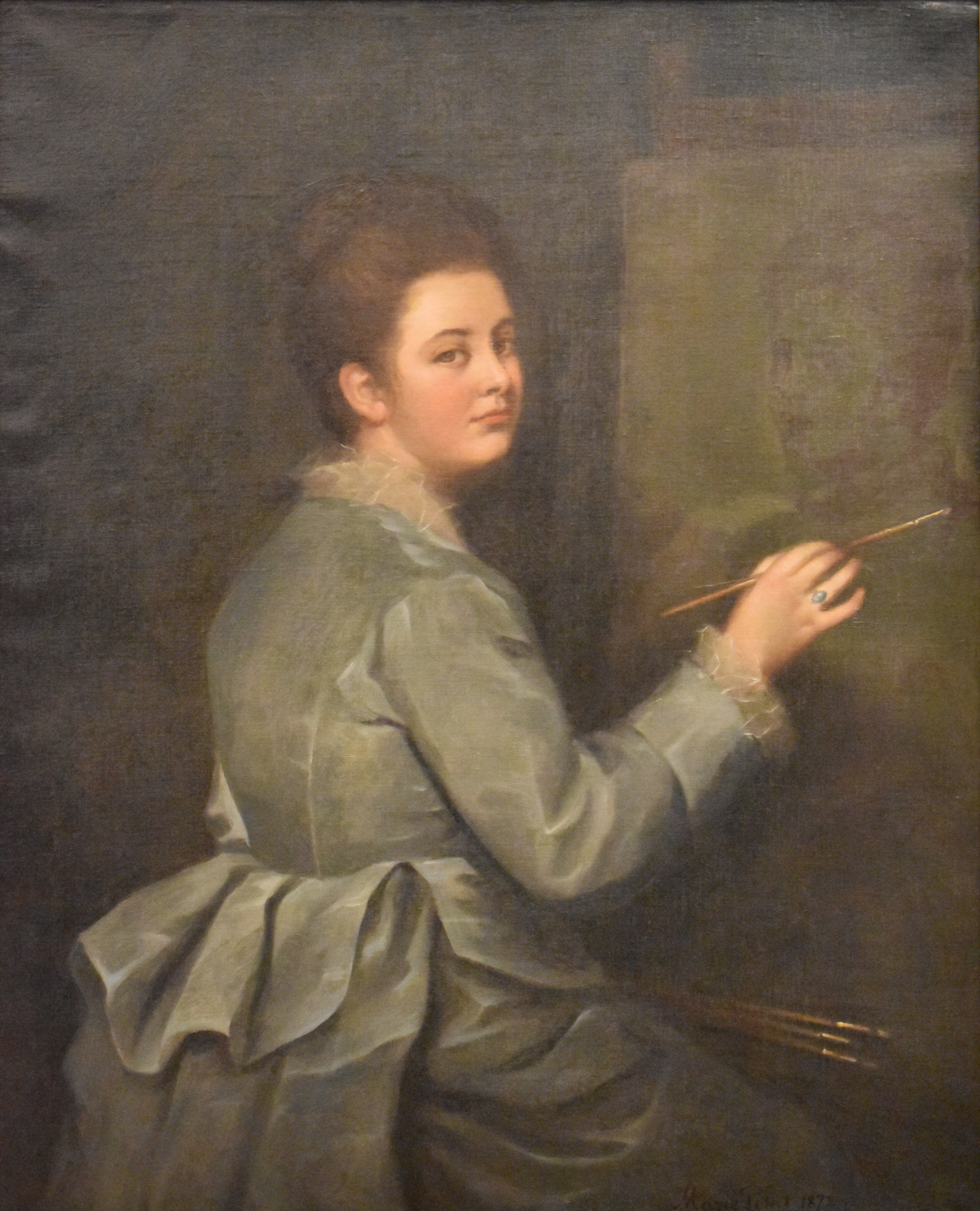
Marie Petiet
age 18, 1872

=== Attribution problems and the male ego ===
Schalcken's 1680 painting of a woman painting was attributed to Godfried Schalken before its restoration in the 20th century revealed the full signature, that of his sister Maria Schalcken. Often the daughters, wives or sisters of male painters, female artists have seen their work unrecognized or minimized (if not ridiculed or vilified), their talent denied or exploited, their careers forgotten and their names erased, often to the benefit of their male relatives, and also of more famous painters, this in greater or lesser good faith, or fraudulently, by the forgery of a signature. A simple example among many others, when the portraits and self-portraits of Jacques-Louis David's female students were considered particularly successful, the teacher was suspected of being the author, and the false attribution was then adopted by posterity. The portrait signed "MDH Keane" (the initials "MDH" being those of her maiden name) was produced after the highly publicized lawsuit won by Margaret Keane in 1986 against Walter Keane over the authorship of all the paintings she had simply signed "Keane". This case is reminiscent of others, such as Judith Leyster's paintings signed by Frans Hals, those of Constance Mayer signed by Pierre-Paul Prud'hon... or simply the actions of Jean-Baptiste-Pierre Lebrun, a painter of no stature but an informed dealer, who sold the paintings of his wife Élisabeth Louise Vigée Le Brun without her having the slightest idea of the fortune he had made from them and which he had lost in gambling. Even as an adult and later married, Marietta Robusti remained under the thumb of her father Tintoretto all her life, and was able to leave only very few paintings of her own. Problems of attribution also arise for Virginia Vezzi, wife and model of Simon Vouet, of whom there are at least one or two self-portraits.

Financial difficulties were not always the issue, but rather the most frequent problems of understanding between spouses. Louis Marcoussis having decided that only one cubist should exist in his couple, it was not he, but Alice Halicka who had to destroy some of his paintings; we still have her self-portrait from 1913. The same misfortune befell Rita Angus, married at the age of 22 for a few years to the painter Alfred Herbert Cook, and who would go on to paint 55 self-portraits ("He didn’t like some of my paintings, and at his request I destroyed some works because I was his wife. And also, to have peace, I agreed to give up painting"), and certainly to several others.

Like Paula Modersohn-Becker, the wife of the academic painter Otto Modersohn, Marie Bracquemond, an admirer of Renoir and Monet, was married to someone who did not appreciate her aesthetic aspiration. Her husband, artist Félix Bracquemond, succeeded in making her abandon Impressionism, and even all artistic production twenty years after her self-portrait as a young bride.

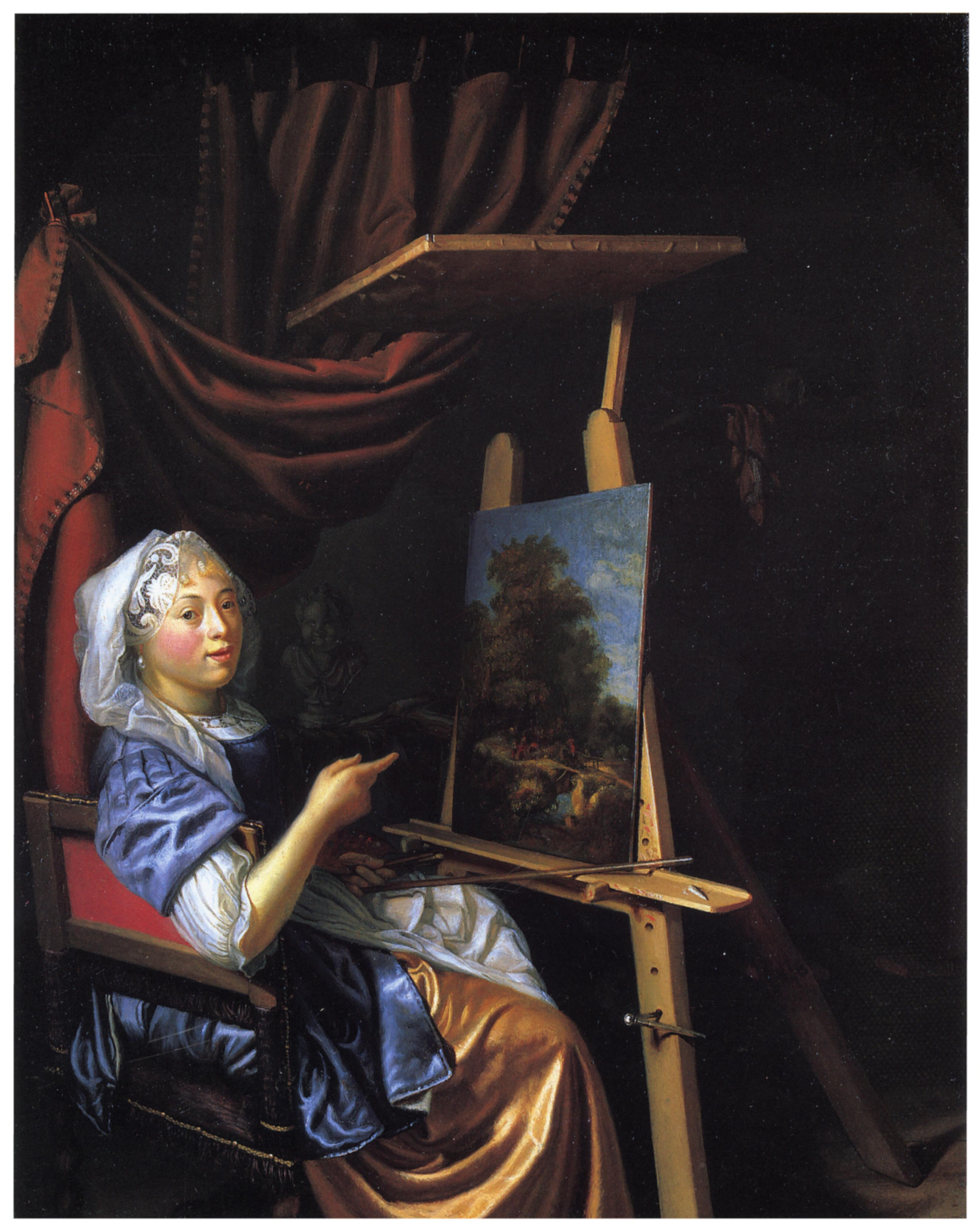
Maria Schalcken
1680

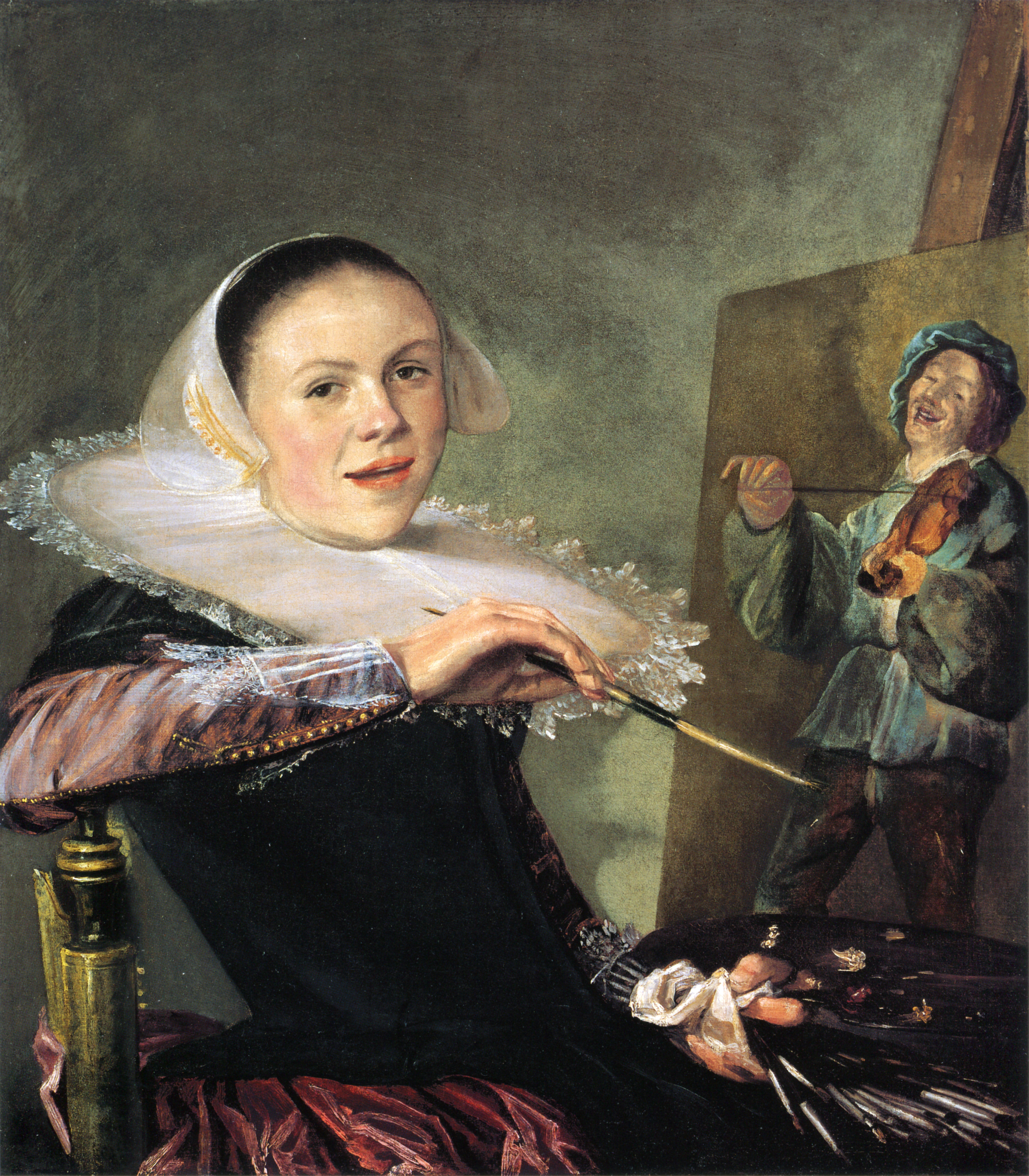
Judith Leyster
c. 1630

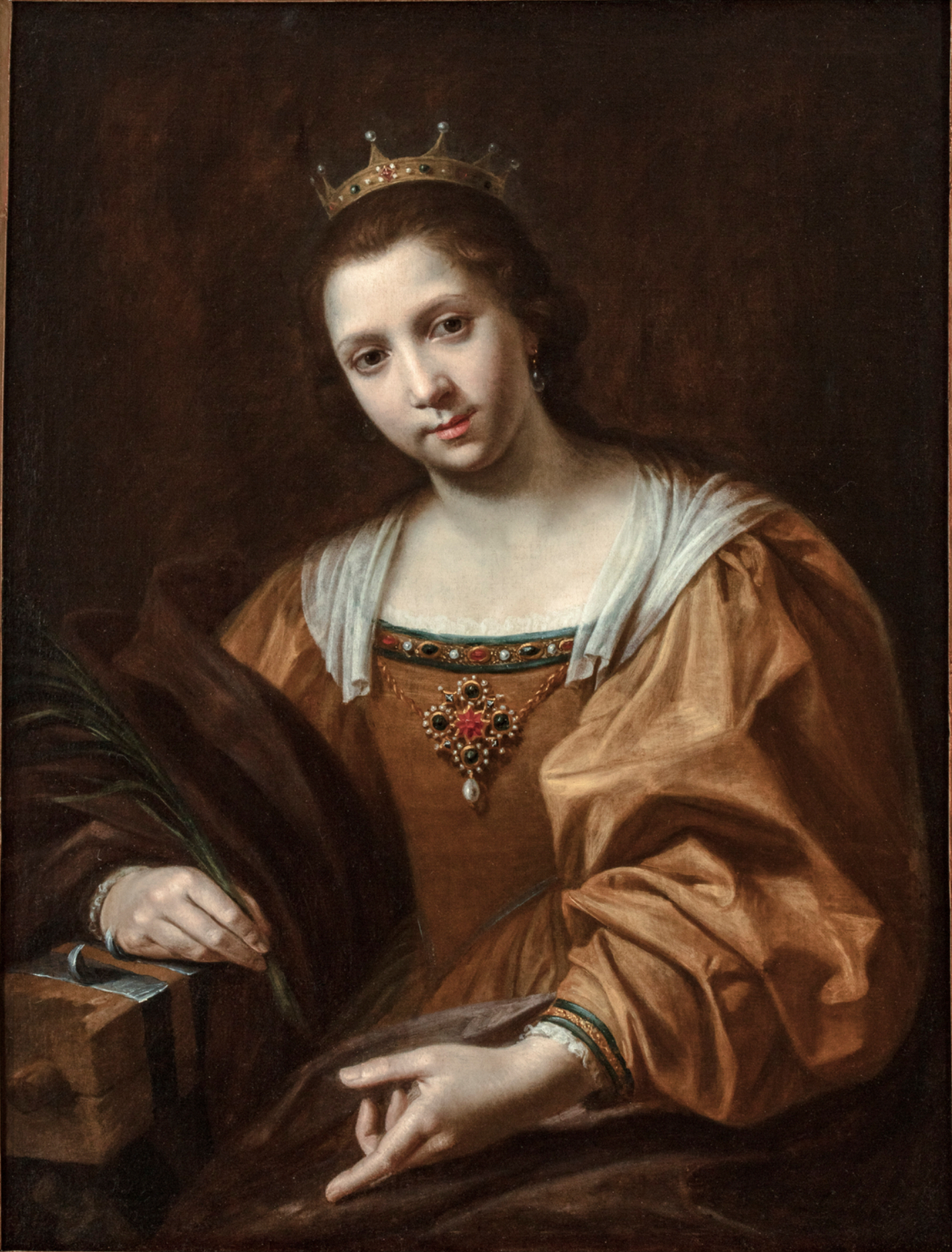
Virginia Vezzi, Self-portrait as Saint Catherine of Alexandria
c. 1624

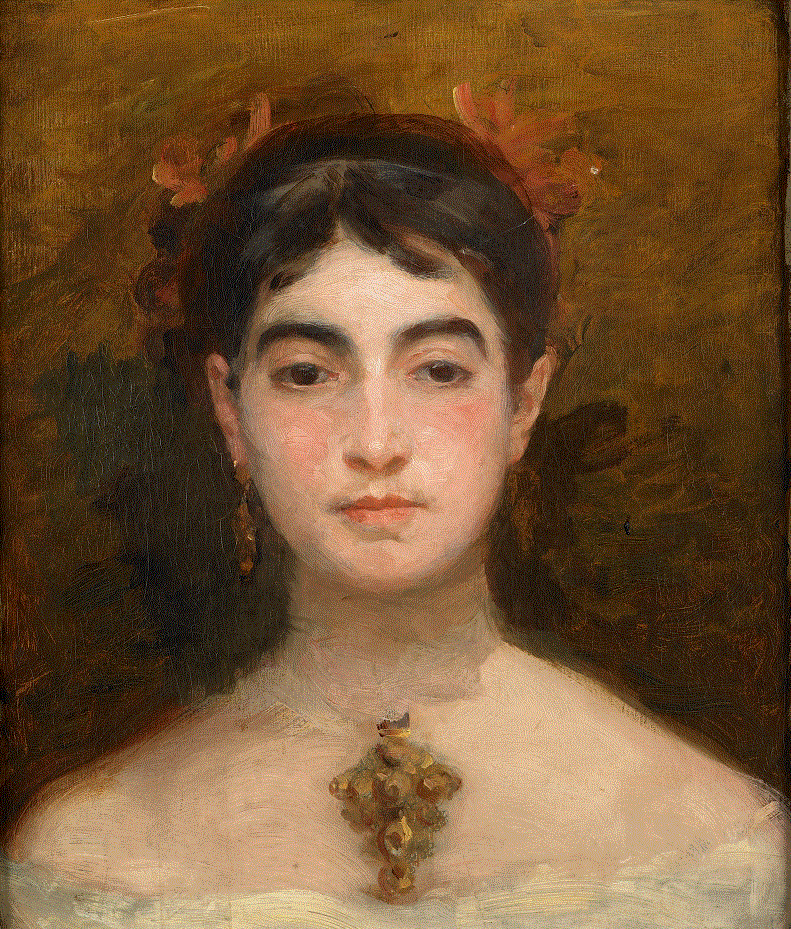
Marie Bracquemond, 1870

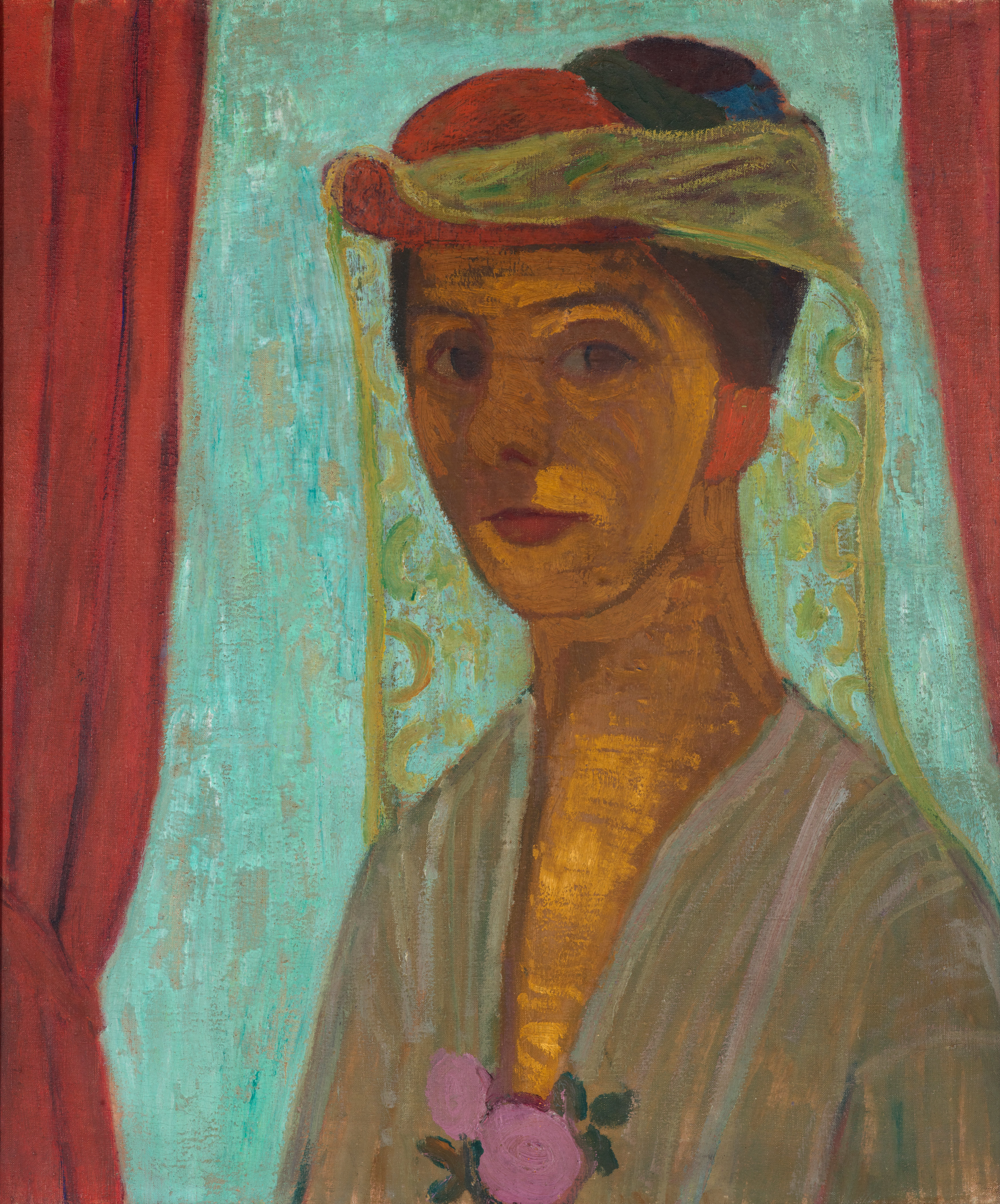
Paula Modersohn-Becker
c. 1906–1907

There are many examples of women artists under deleterious marital influence in the history of art, and one of them is illustrated in painting by the self-portrait of Maria Cosway made in 1787. Trained in Italy, Maria Luisa Caterina Cecilia Hadfield made a first portrait on a traditional model. In 1781 she entered a loveless marriage to Richard Cosway, a renowned London miniature painter, 18 years her senior and a fickle husband. He used the beauty and talents of his young wife – she held a salon, received all of London, sang her own compositions and played the harp and harpsichord – to make her his ambassador, more prosaically his advertising front. In 1830, widowed for 9 years, she was able to write "If Mr. C. had allowed me to get a professional position, I would have made a better painter; but left to myself, little by little, instead of improving, I lost everything I had acquired during my studies in Italy." In the portraits drawn by her husband, she is as he wanted the world to see her; in her self-portrait three years before their separation, she resumes her Italian turban, but not the lipstick or the cameo, which, a fervent Catholic in an Anglican country, she replaces with a cross. With a closed face, she depicts what she feels: the crossed arms and the hidden right hand, that of the artist, indicate that she cannot practice her profession; the wedding ring on the left hand, the black wall that closes the space and the stormy sky illustrate everything that confines her.

== See also ==
- Self-portraiture
