= Palais Liechtenstein =

Palais Liechtenstein may refer to:

== Vienna ==
- Stadtpalais Liechtenstein (Liechtenstein City Palace), owned by the Princely Family of Liechtenstein, in the 1st district of Vienna (Innere Stadt)
- Gartenpalais Liechtenstein (Liechtenstein Garden Palace), part of the Liechtenstein Museum, on the Fürstengasse, in the 9th district of Vienna (Alsergrund)
- de:Palais Liechtenstein (Herrengasse), a former palace on the Herrengasse

== Feldkirch ==
- de:Palais Liechtenstein (Feldkirch), in Feldkirch, Austria

== Prague ==
- Liechtenstein Palace (Kampa Island, Prague)
- Liechtenstein Palace (Malostranské náměstí, Prague)
