= Ernst Odowalsky =

17th century Swedish and Imperial general

Ernst Odowalsky von Streitberg
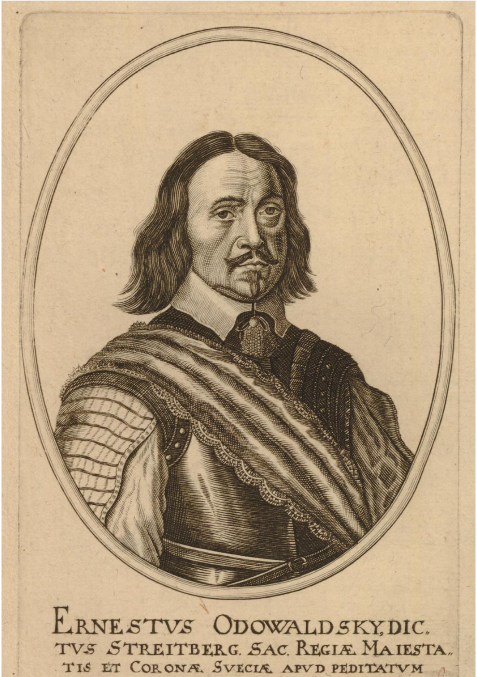
- Ernst Odowalsky in a copper engraving by the Strasbourg artist Peter Aubry (1610–1686).
- Born: 1592; Bohemia
- Died: 15 March 1672 (aged 79–80); Oberndorf, Franconia
- Military career
- Allegiance: Holy Roman Empire; (yes) Swedish Empire
- Service years: 1618–1648
- Rank: Lieutenant Colonel
- Conflicts: Thirty Years War: Bohemian Revolt; Battle of White Mountain; Skirmish of Ruppertsgrün; Siege of Eger (1647) (POW); Battle of Prague

Ernst Odowalsky (von Streitberg since 1651; 1592 – 15 March 1672), was a military officer during the Thirty Years' War. He rose from the rank of common soldier to that of Lieutenant Colonel in the Imperial Army. Due to disability, he lost his position, and through looting, he lost his property. When the Emperor refused him compensation, he defected to the Swedes in 1648; his intelligence subsequently enabled General Hans Christoff von Königsmarck to capture of the Malá Strana.

== In Imperial service ==
Odowalsky came from either a Bohemian or Franconian family. During the Bohemian Revolt at the beginning of the Thirty Years' War, he sided with the Imperial cause and fought as a common musketeer in the Battle of White Mountain in November 1620. Over the following years, he rose through the ranks to become an officer. In 1628, holding the rank of captain, he was stationed in the Imperial occupied city of Wismar.

In October 1634, "Ottowaldische soldiers on horseback" were mentioned in records; they attempted to extort a payment of 1,000 thalers from the Electoral Saxon town of Marienberg in the Ore Mountains in exchange for sparing the town.

Following the defeat of Imperial General Hans Wolfgang von Salis by Swedish troops in the skirmish of Ruppertsgrün near Pöhl in March 1639, Odowalsky, then a lieutenant colonel, managed to escape along with his commander, Colonel Wamboldt, and approximately 1,000 men, successfully making their way to safety in Eger (now Cheb, Czech Republic).

Due to a severe injury to his arm or shoulder, he was forced to retire from active military service later that same year. For the next several years, Odowalsky resided primarily in Eger, where he had married a local woman in 1628 and owned both a house and landed estates in the surrounding countryside.

In 1645 and 1646, he was involved in the billeting of soldiers stationed within the Eger District; in this capacity, he traveled to various locations, including the Imperial headquarters in Klatovy and the town of Marktredwitz, which was administratively subordinate to Eger. Although his estates had already been plundered on multiple occasions since the 1630s, his house was also burned to the ground during the Swedish capture of Eger in 1647, and he himself was taken prisoner.

== Swedish service ==
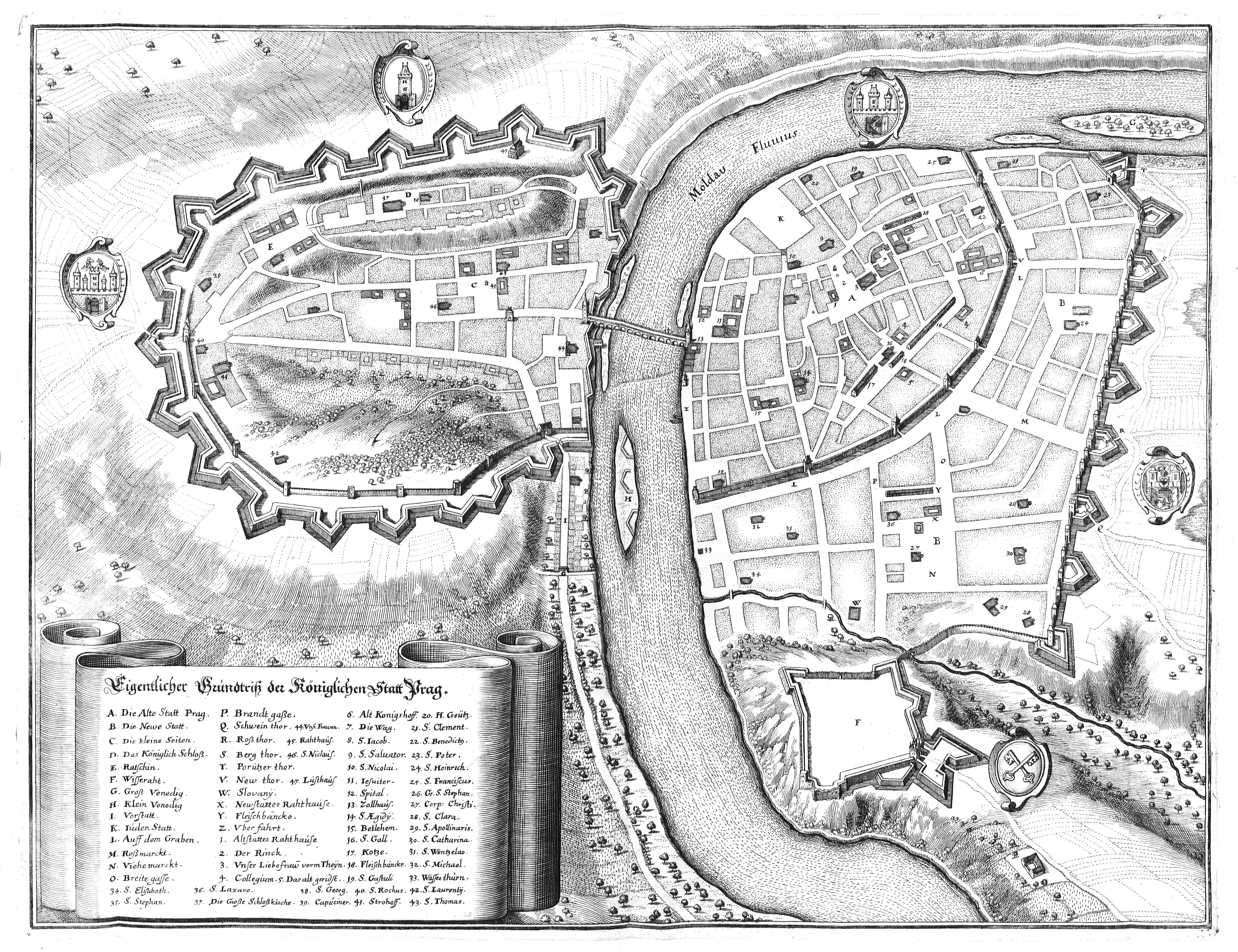
Merian's map of Prague, before the assault (1648)

As a result of the destruction, Odowalsky had lost his livelihood. He obtained permission from Johann von Koppy, the new Swedish commander of Eger, to travel to Prague. There, he was granted an audience with Emperor Ferdinand III, who gave him a sum of money as compensation for his plight and promised him an officer's post in Elbogen (now Loket).

However, the Bohemian Provincial Commander, Rudolf von Colloredo, failed to honor this promise; instead, he merely allocated Odowalsky "eight rations", of a nature not specified in the records, while Odowalsky ran out of funds during the ensuing wait. Consequently, Odowalsky decided to offer his services to the Swedes.

He settled his family in Plauen in the Vogtland region and, in May 1648, traveled to Weiden in the Upper Palatinate to meet with the Swedish General Königsmarck. He succeeded in convincing the Swedish commander by offering to assist him in a surprise seizure of Prague's Lesser Town (Malá Strana). The Swedes subsequently enlisted Odowalsky at a monthly salary of 100 thalers.

In early June, utilizing Odowalsky's intelligence regarding Prague's defensive fortifications, Königsmarck began preparing a strike against the Lesser Town. Since the Swedes intended to launch their attack only after the arrival of reinforcements from Leipzig, they initially contented themselves with capturing smaller localities near Eger, such as Bečov Castle and Falkenau (now Sokolov).

By doing so, they led the Imperial forces to believe that their next objective was the heavily fortified castle at Elbogen. The secrecy surrounding their plans was successfully maintained until the very last moment. In late July, the Swedes marched toward Plzeň, where they seized all livestock grazing outside the city walls but otherwise ignored the Imperial garrison commanded by Jan van der Croon.

On 24 July they advanced toward Rakovník; there, in order to maximize their speed, they left behind their baggage train and artillery, mounting their infantrymen upon the artillery horses instead. On the night of July 26, they attacked Prague at the weak points that Odowalsky had identified for them.

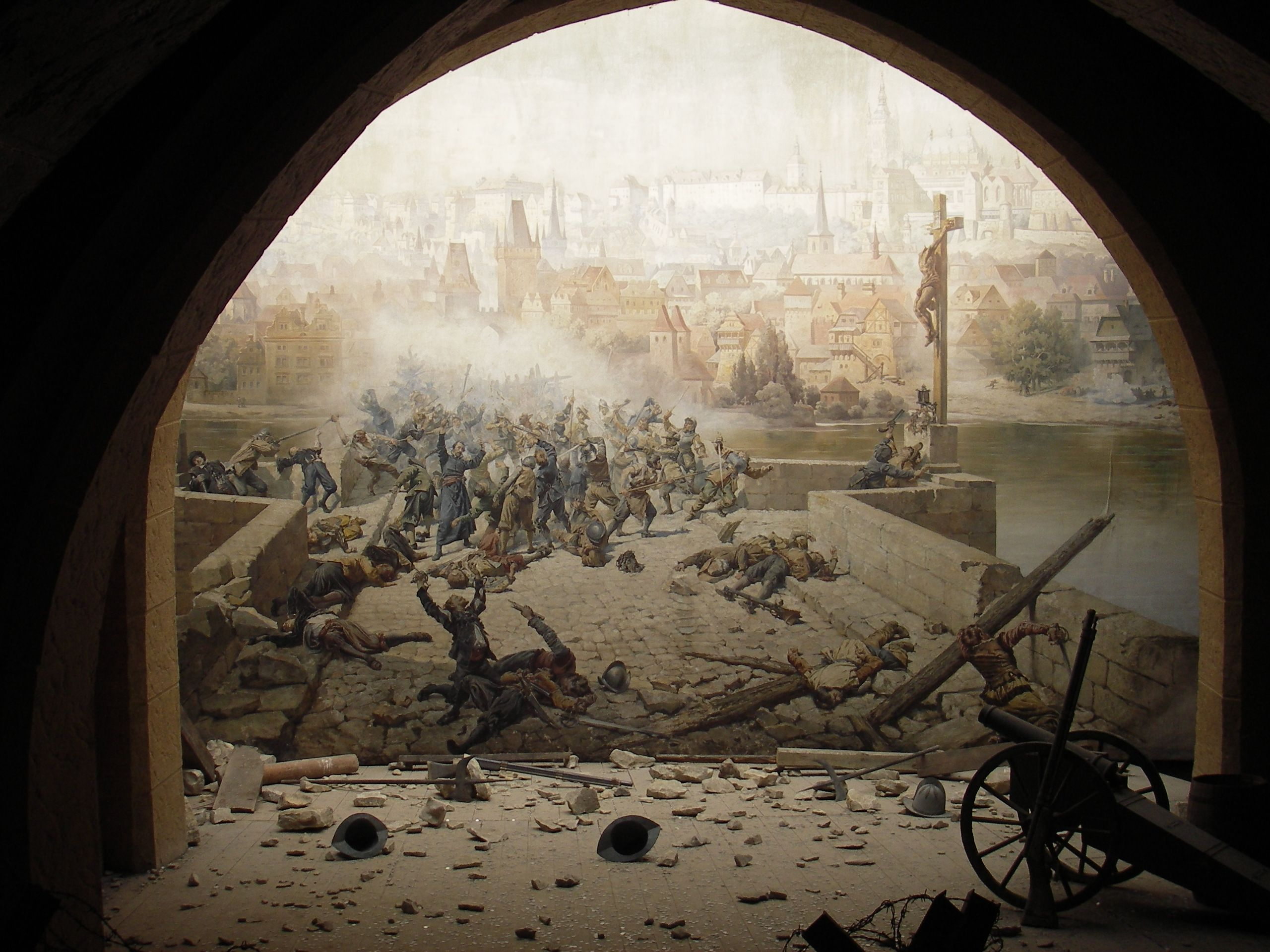
Swedish soldiers assaulting the Charles Bridge

On 24 July Odowalsky had already set out with an advance guard of 200 horsemen to seal off all roads leading from Rakovník toward Prague, ensuring that no news of the Swedes' approach could reach the defenders. On the evening of 25 July, around midnight, the Swedes reached the White Mountain, located just west of Prague. From there, they heard the ringing of bells in the city, prompting Königsmarck to fear that an alarm was being raised.

However, Odowalsky, who possessed intimate knowledge of the area, recognized the sound as the signal for midnight prayers for the monks of the Benedictine and Capuchin monasteries, and he reassured the Swedish general. At 3:00 a.m., Odowalsky led an advance force, comprising dragoons and Swedish infantry under the command of Johann von Koppy, to the Strahov Gate, situated near the monastery of the same name.

They targeted a sparsely guarded section of the city walls that, thanks to a mound of earth in the moat and ongoing repair work, was easily scalable. From that vantage point, the Swedes took the few guards by surprise and opened the gate for the remainder of their troops, who had been lying in ambush within the gardens just outside the gate.

By morning, they had successfully captured Prague’s Lesser Town (Malá Strana) and the Hradčany. Subsequently, they spent three days looting the Lesser Town, seizing countless art treasures in what became known as the Prague Art Loot.

Without the intelligence provided by Odowalsky, the capture of the Lesser Town would have been all but impossible. Although the Swedes ultimately failed to capture the Old Town and New Town, located on the opposite bank of the Vltava River, before the war ended and the looming threat of Prague’s total conquest had profound consequences for the willingness of the country's sovereign, Emperor Ferdinand, to pursue peace; in September, he gave his consent to the conclusion of the Peace of Westphalia.

At the insistence of the Swedes, a special declaration of protection for Odowalsky was included in the text of the Peace of Westphalia. He also authored a written defense of his motives, accompanied by an account of the capture of the Lesser Town, which was published in the sixth volume of the Theatrum Europaeum.

In 1651, Queen Christina of Sweden honored him by elevating him to the nobility with the predicate "von Streitberg." Odowalsky acquired property in Oberndorf in Franconia, where he died on 15 March 1672.
