= Sack of Prague =

Prague was captured and sacked twice in the Thirty Years' War, right at the start, and right at the end:

- in 1620 by Habsburg troops, after the Battle of White Mountain
- in 1648 by Swedish troops, after the Battle of Prague (1648); they did not capture the whole city - this is the more likely reference.
