= Siege of Eger (1647) =

1647 siege of the Thirty Years' War

- Part of the Thirty Years' War
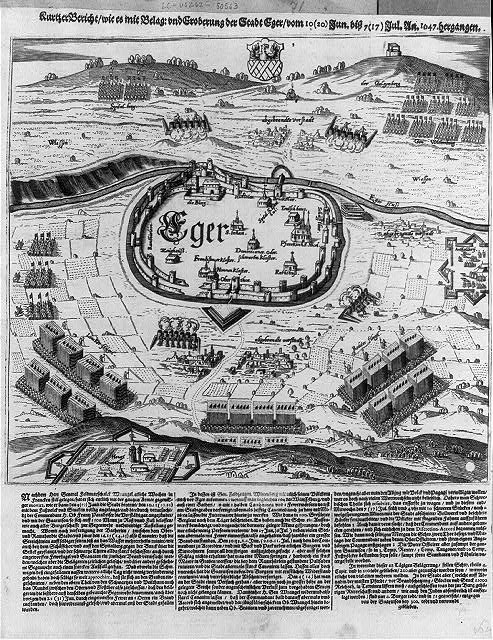
- An engraving of the siege
Date	14 June – 18 July 1647
Location	Eger, Bohemia (modern-day Cheb, Czech Republic)
Result	Swedish victory
Territorial changes	Eger falls to the Swedes

Belligerents
Holy Roman Empire	(yes) Swedish Empire

Commanders and leaders
Franz Paradeiser; Ernst Odowalsky (POW); Graf von Holzappel; Johann von Werth (Holy Roman Empire) Raimondo Montecuccoli	(yes) Carl Gustaf Wrangel (Swedish Empire) Arvid Wittenberg

Units involved
Eger Garrison	(yes) Wittenberg's Corp

Strength
Unknown	Unknown

Casualties and losses
Unknown	Unknown

The Siege of Eger (Note: Swedish: Belägringen av Eger, German: Belagerung von Eger, Czech: obléhání Chebu) was conducted by the Swedish Army under Carl Gustaf Wrangel. The town would attempt to be relieved by an Imperial army under the command of the Graf von Holzappel. Following the siege, in August, a second Imperial army, under the command of Jan van der Croon, launched a failed siege of the town.

== Prelude ==
In 1646, Carl Gustaf Wrangel replaced Lennart Torstenson as commander of the Swedish forces in Germany. Wrangel and the French general Turenne invaded Bavaria in 1646, this campaign ravaged Bavaria and forced it to sign a truce. With Bavaria out of the war for now, Wrangel turned his attention to Bohemia, he moved north-east into Franconia. He used the Upper Palatinate to cross the border to Eger (now Cheb).

Wrangel called up Arvid Wittenberg and his 7,000 strong corp from Silesia. Wrangel used the Franconian resources to supply his troops. The Imperial army was commanded by the Peter Melander, Graf von Holzappel, the Habsburgs massed around 20,000 men to defend against Wrangel's invasion. In Bavaria, the Bavarian General of cavalry, Johann von Werth, lead a mutiny and deserted the Bavarian army, he then crossed the border into Austria and joined the Imperials.

Wrangel advanced to Schweinfurt, taking to town after eight days, before moving into Bohemia, Eger was chosen because Wrangel believed it was the key to Bohemia. Eger was commanded by Ernst Odowalsky and Franz Paradeiser.

== Siege ==
Wrangel and Wittenberg arrived at Eger on 14 June. Upon hearing news of the Swedish siege, Holzappel gathered an army which included Raimondo Montecuccoli and the Bavarian deserters under Johann von Werth at České Budějovice. Emperor Ferdinand III personally accompanied his troops for part of the march to boost morale.

Wrangel put a his cavalry has a screening force south of Eger, this caused the Imperials planned attacks to fizzle out. On 18 July, the garrison surrendered to Wrangel and Wittenberg, among the casualties was Ernst Odowalsky, who had been captured.

Undaunted by the siege, Holzappel positioned his army across the Eger valley from Wrangel, blocking the way into Bavaria. But by 8 August 1647, the Imperial relief army had withdrawn southward without having achieved any military success and was encamped near Křimice (now part of Plzeň) and Touškov on the Plzeň Plain.

== Aftermath ==
Wrangel pursued the Imperials through the Königswart Pass. There, he rounded up every peasant he could find and forced them to expand the defensive fortifications. Wrangel left a strong garrison behind and continued the march south with his main force. On 13 August, he established his headquarters at Plan. On 22 August the Imperials assaulted the Swedish camp at Triebl, inflecting a minor victory on the Swedes.

Following the siege, Wrangel appointed Johann von Koppy as governor of the town. In October, Imperial commander Jan van der Croon recaptured Königswart and tried to cut off Eger's supply. The blockade ended when a relief force under Hans Christoff von Königsmarck on 6 April 1648.

== Gallery ==
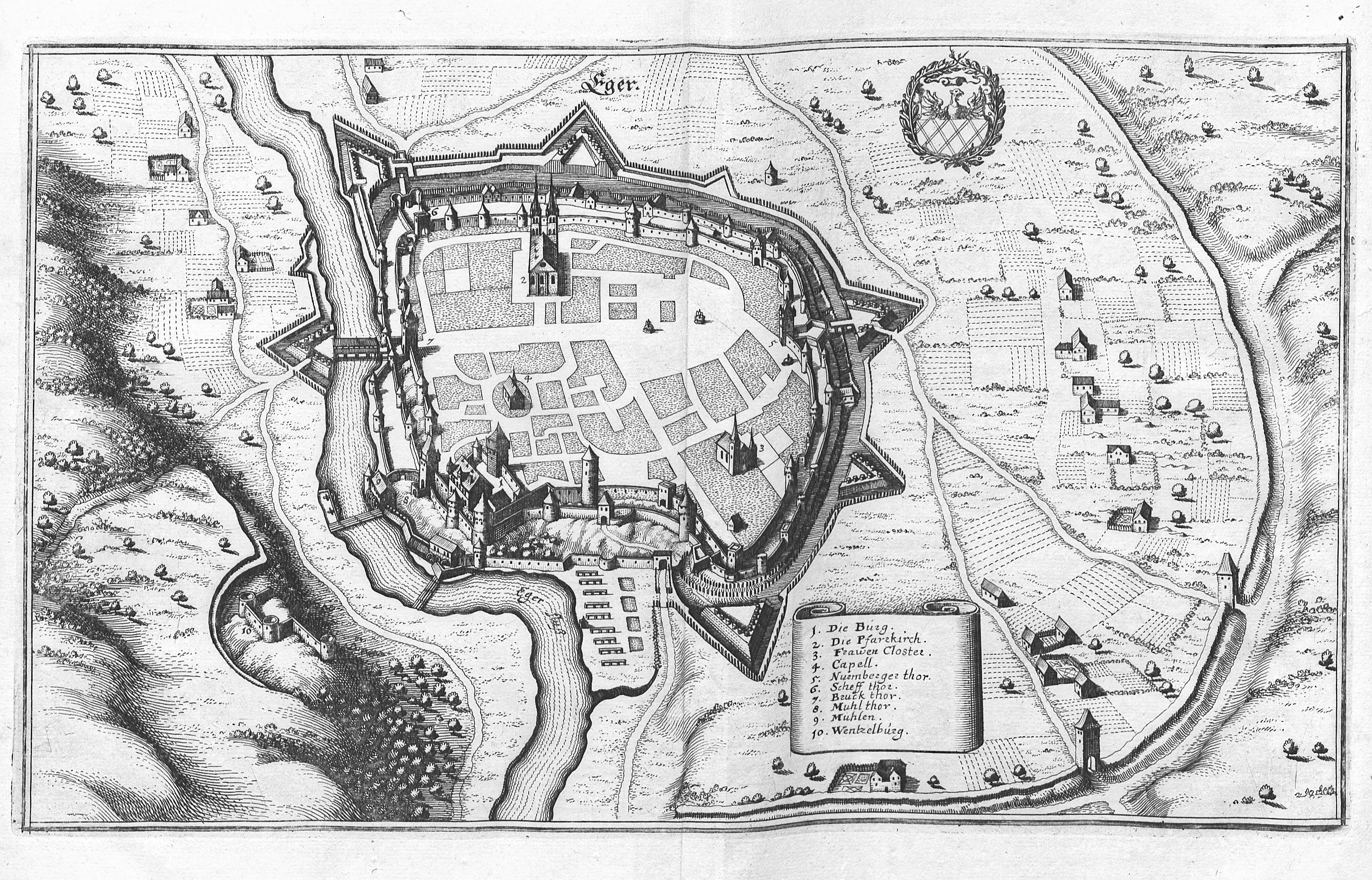
Engraving by Matthias Merian

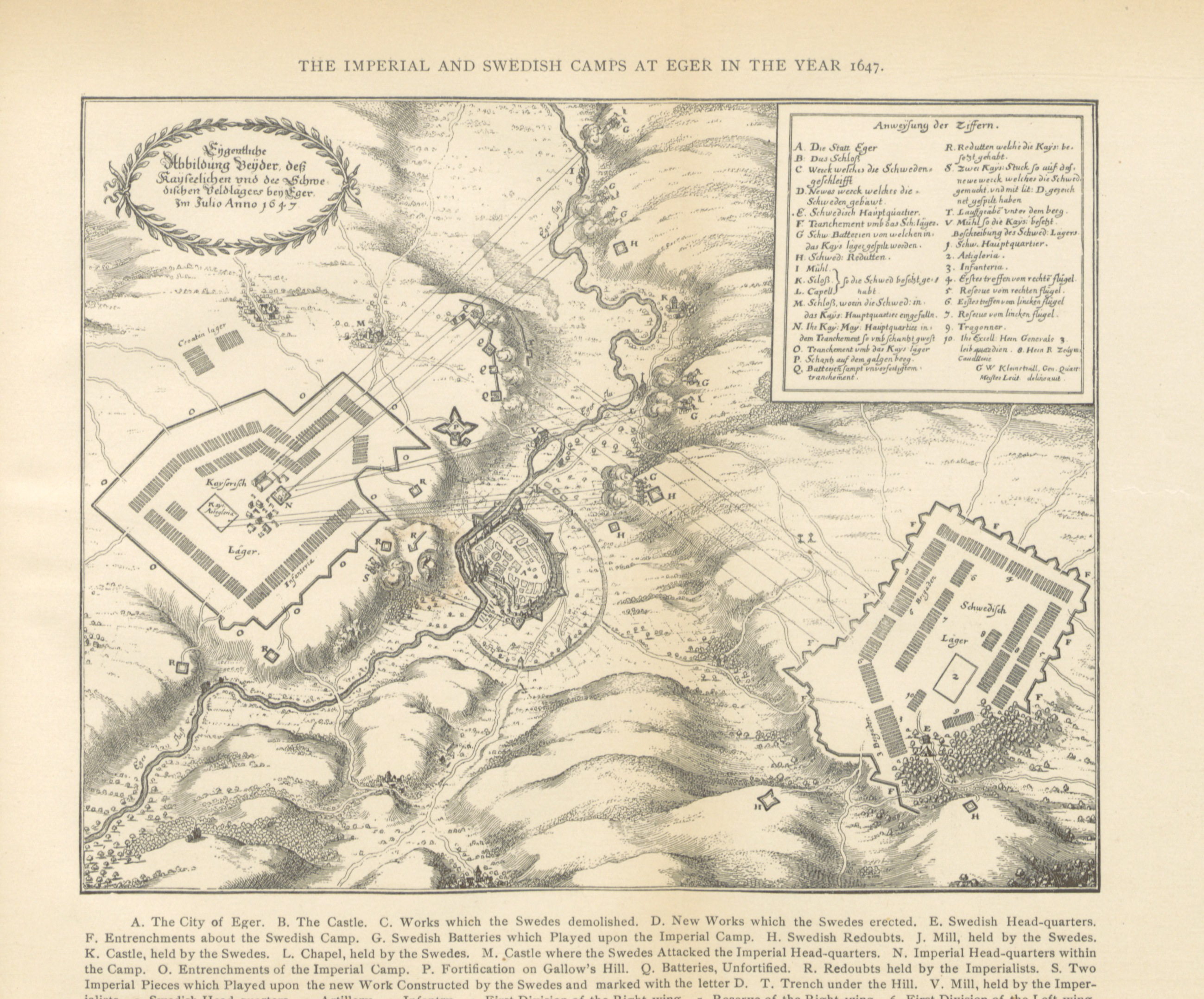
An engraving of the Swedish and Imperial armies at Eger

== Sources ==
- Wilson, Peter H. (2009). Europe's Tragedy: A History of the Thirty Years War. Allen Lane. ISBN 978-0-7139-9592-3.
- Drugulin, Wilhelm E. (1867). W. Drugulins historischer Bilderatlas. Verzeichniss einer Sammlung von Einzelblättern zur Cultur- und Staatengeschichte vom 15.-19. Jahrhundert.
- Paas, John R. (2002). The German Political Broadsheet 1600–1700.
- Höfer, Ernst (1997). Das Ende des Dreißigjährigen Krieges. Strategie und Kriegsbild. ISBN 3-412-04297-8.
- Wedgwood, C.V. (1938). The Thirty Years War (2005 ed.). New York Review of Books. ISBN 978-1-59017-146-2.
- Warlich, Bernd (2012). "Croon, Jan Freiherr van der". Der Dreißigjährige Krieg in Selbstzeugnissen, Chroniken und Berichten (in German).
- Warlich, Bernd (2021). "Odowalsky [Otowalsky, Ottowalski, Otto Walsky, Ottowald], called von Streitberg, Ernst". Der Dreißigjährige Krieg in Selbstzeugnissen, Chroniken und Berichten.
- Warlich, Bernd (2022). "Koppey [Kopy, Koppen, Koppe, Koppy, Coppy, Copy, Copi, Copie, Copey, Cupey, Kappi], Johann [Johan, Hans Franciscus]". Der Dreißigjährige Krieg in Selbstzeugnissen, Chroniken und Berichten.
