= Siege of Eger =

Siege of Eger may refer to:

- Siege of Eger (1552)
- Siege of Eger (1596)
- Blockade of Eger (1647-1648)
