= Blockade of Eger =

1647-1648 siege of the Thirty Years' War

- Part of the Thirty Years' War
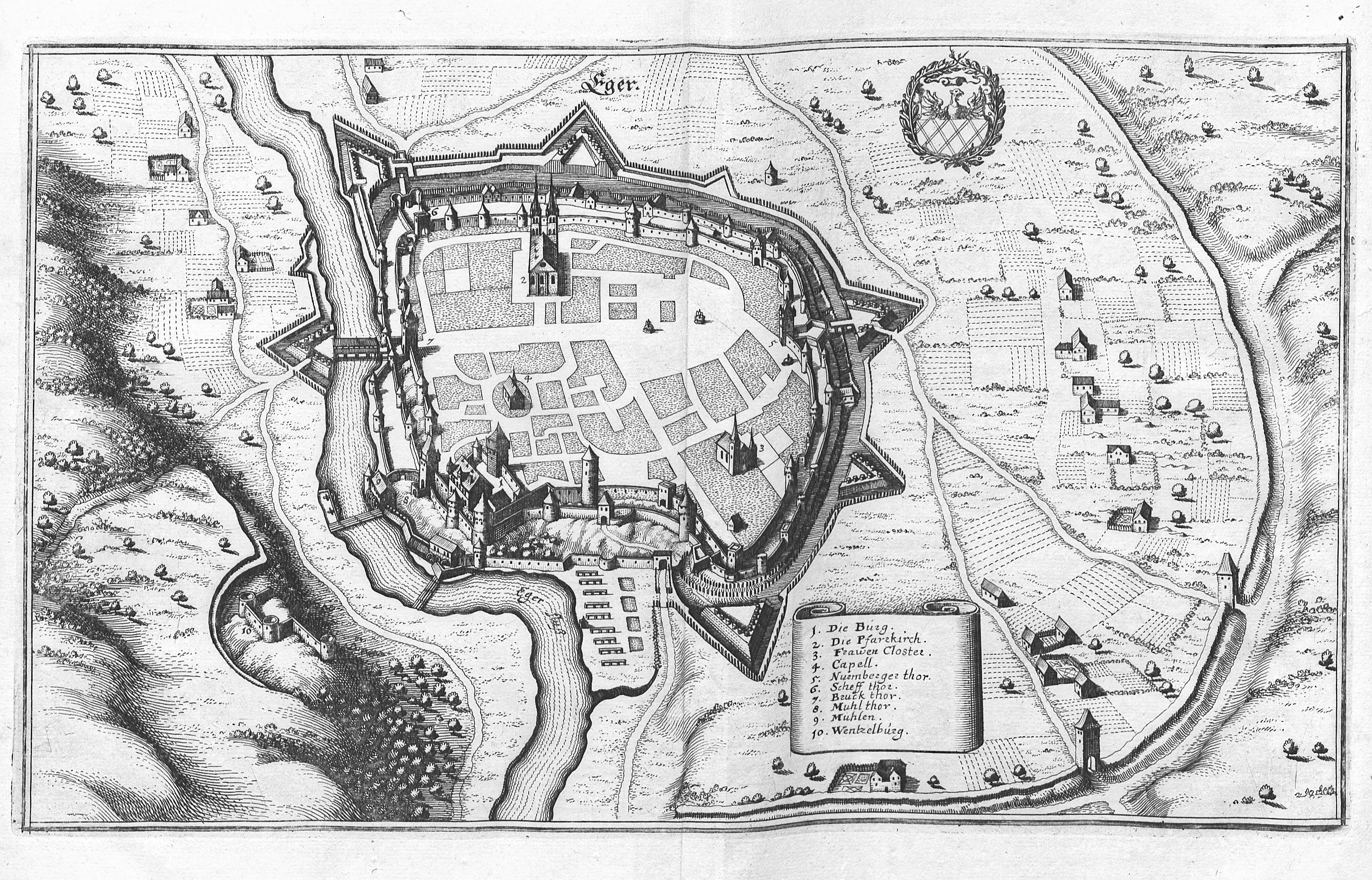
- Engraving of Eger by Matthias Merian
Date	25 October 1647 – 6 April 1648
Location	Eger (modern-day Cheb), Bohemia
Result	Swedish victory
Territorial changes	Status quo ante bellum

Belligerents
(yes) Swedish Empire	Holy Roman Empire; Bavaria

Commanders and leaders
(Swedish Empire) Johann von Koppy (yes) Hans Christoff von Königsmarck (Swedish Empire) Carl Gustaf Wrangel	Jan van der Croon (Holy Roman Empire) Jobst Friedrich Count Götz (Note: Siegmund Friedrich von Götzen)

Units involved
(yes) Eger Garrison	Cürassier-Regiment Schmidt (Holy Roman Empire) van der Croon's Dragoons (Holy Roman Empire) Pucchiem Regiment (Holy Roman Empire) de Mers Regiment (Holy Roman Empire) Waldsassen Garrison (Electorate of Bavaria) Tachau Garrison

Strength
(Swedish Empire) 1,200	Unknown

Casualties and losses
Unknown	Unknown

The Blockade of Eger (Note: German: Blockade von Eger, Czech: Blokáda Egeru, Swedish: Blockaden av Eger) was an attempt to blockade the Swedish garrison of Eger conducted by Jan van der Croon. The blockade would be broken by a Swedish relief force under Hans Christoff von Königsmarck.

== Background ==
In July of 1647, a Swedish army under the command of Carl Gustaf Wrangel captured the Bohemian town of Eger (now Cheb). Around a month later an Imperial army skirmished with Swedish troops at Triebl. Following the campaign Ferdinand III ordered Jan van der Croon, Governor of Plzeň, to recapture the Swedish occupied town of Eger.

== Blockade ==
On 25 October, the blockade would begin when Croon recaptured the Königswarter (now Lázně Kynžvart) redoubt outside Eger. In order to win it back by starvation, but he was not able to completely seal off the town until the onset of winter.

Croon's army included his own regiment, the depleted regiments of Puchheim and de Mers, companies withdrawn from Tachau, Bavarian cavalry from Waldsassen, the Cürassier-Regiment Schmidt under Jobst Friedrich Count Götz, and some artillery.

Wrangel marched north-east to capture the Imperial in the Upper Palatinate in an attempt to relieve Eger. Wrangel was unable to break though to Eger. The Eger garrison was starving and close to surrendering, but Croon was unaware of another Swedish relief force under Hans Christoff von Königsmarck, who was in Halberstadt. In late March of 1648, Königsmarck arrived with a strong force of cavalry to relieve the town. Königsmarck broke through Croon’s blockade between Wunsiedel and Waldsassen and, on 6 April Königsmarck brought 300 wagonloads of provisions and 100 head of cattle into the starving town.

== Aftermath ==
Following the siege, Croon reinforced Loket and Falknov (now Sokolov) against possible Swedish attacks, Königsmarck conquered Falknov in June 1648 after several days of shelling. However, he found Loket too strongly fortified and withdrew from there. Shortly after Königsmarck took Croon's defenses he moved east and attacked Prague. The Peace of Westphalia at the end of October ended the fighting in Bohemia. The Battle of Prague would end up being the last battle of the Thirty Years' War.
