= Vinařice (Louny District) =

- Municipality
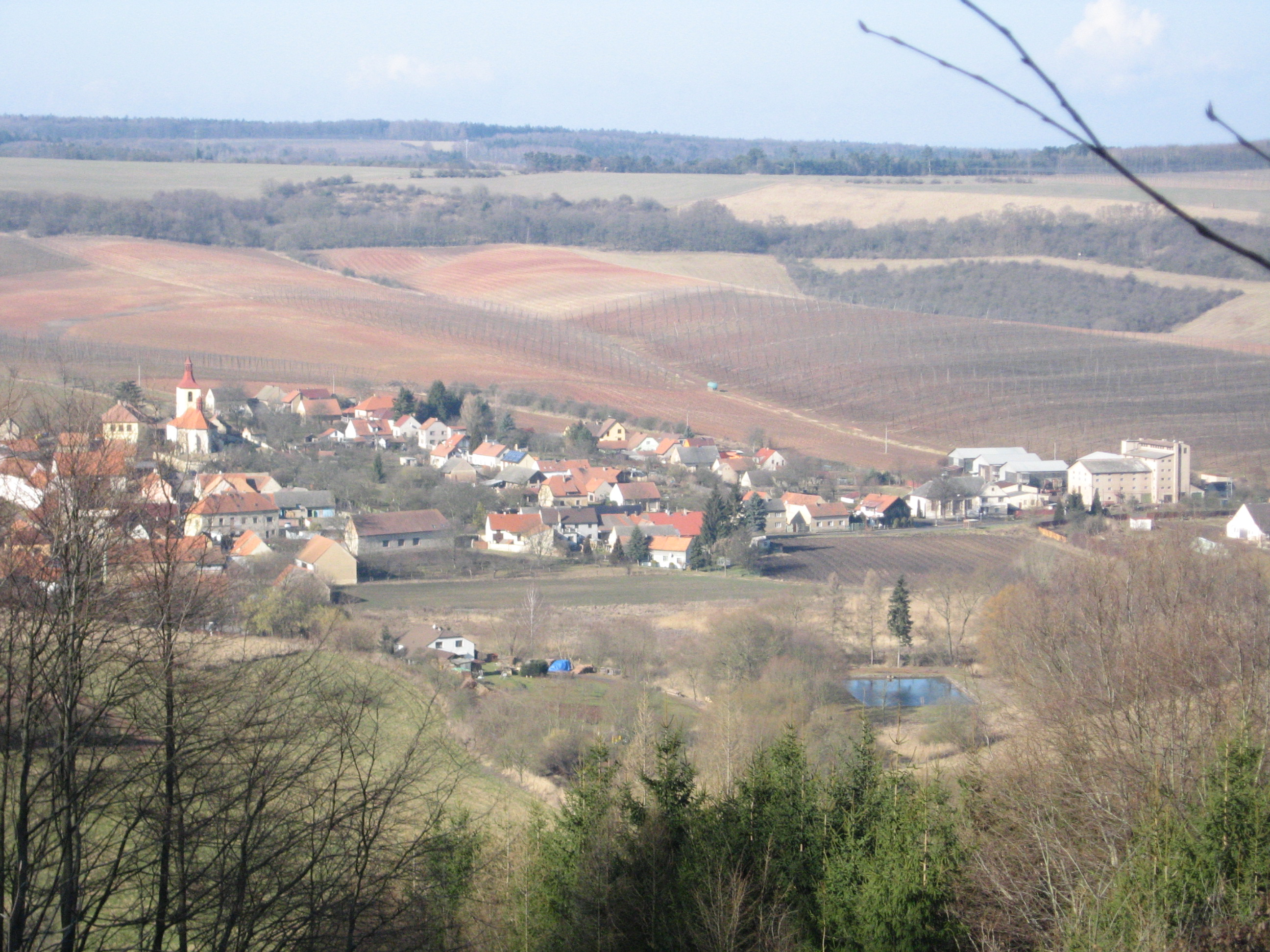
- General view

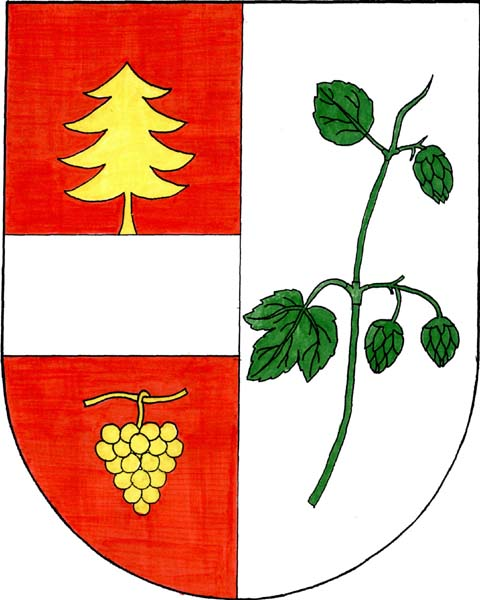
- Flag Coat of arms

- Location in the Czech Republic
- Coordinates: 50°15′57″N 13°49′22″E
- Country: Czech Republic
- Region: Ústí nad Labem
- District: Louny
- First mentioned: 1238

Area
  - Total: 9.58 km^{2} (3.70 sq mi)
- Elevation: 305 m (1,001 ft)

Population (2026-01-01)
  - Total: 245
  - Density: 25.6/km^{2} (66.2/sq mi)
- Time zone: UTC+1 (CET)
  - Summer (DST): UTC+2 (CEST)
- Postal code: 439 15
- Website: www.vinarice.cz

Vinařice is a municipality and village in Louny District in the Ústí nad Labem Region of the Czech Republic. It has about 200 inhabitants.

Vinařice lies approximately 12 kilometres (7 mi) south of Louny, 47 km (29 mi) south of Ústí nad Labem, and 47 km (29 mi) north-west of Prague.

== Administrative division ==
Vinařice consists of two municipal parts (in brackets population according to the 2021 census):

- Vinařice (149)
- Divice (94)

== Demographics ==
Historical population
Year	Pop.	±%
1869	759	—
1880	832	+9.6%
1890	903	+8.5%
1900	910	+0.8%
1910	811	−10.9%
1921	804	−0.9%
1930	824	+2.5%
1950	571	−30.7%
1961	483	−15.4%
1970	436	−9.7%
1980	322	−26.1%
1991	231	−28.3%
2001	227	−1.7%
2011	231	+1.8%
2021	243	+5.2%
Source: Censuses
