= Rudolf von Colloredo =

Bohemian nobleman

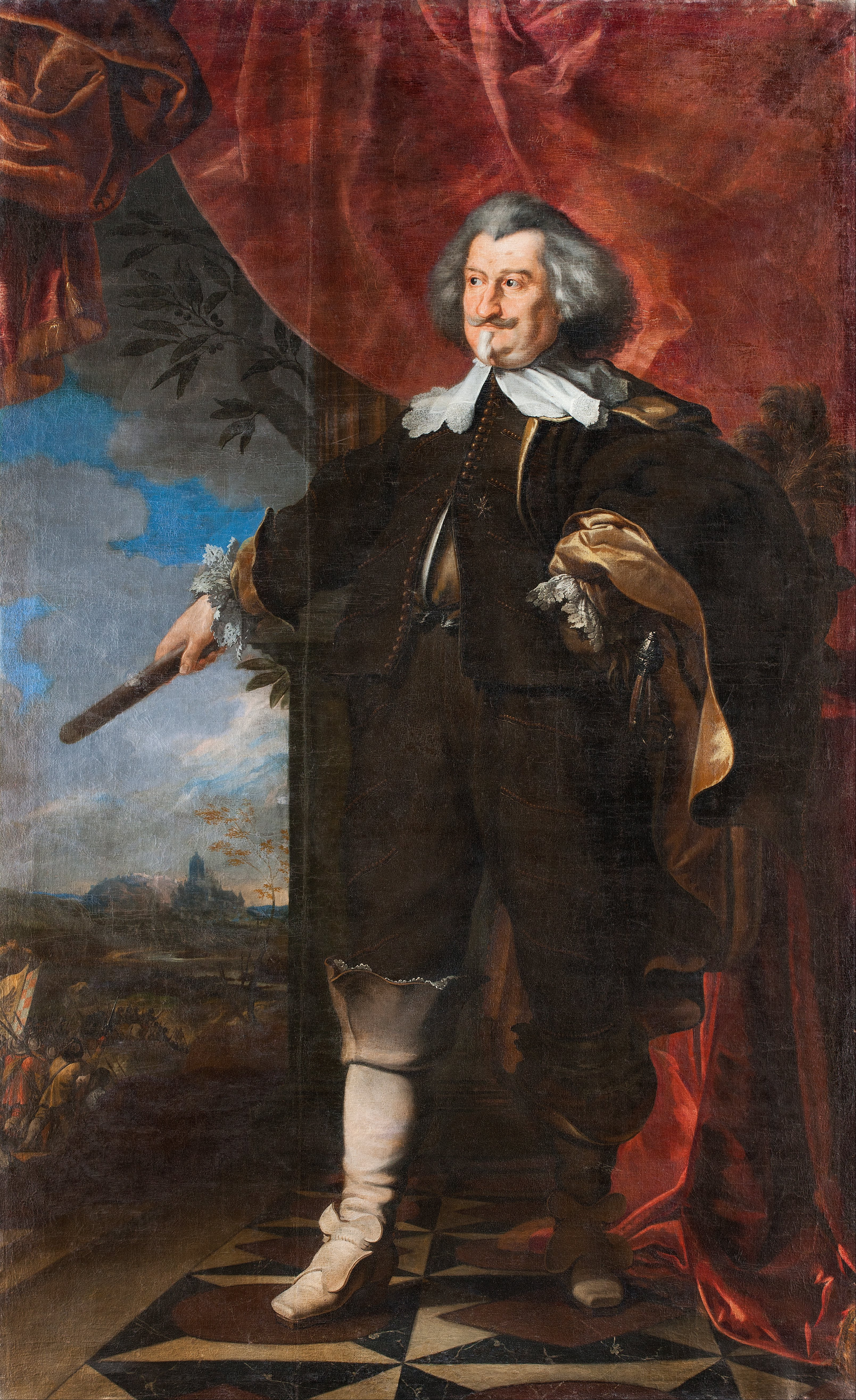
Frans Luycx (attributed to), Portrait of Rudolf von Colloredo

Rudolf Hieronymus Eusebius von Colloredo-Waldsee, born 2 November 1585 in České Budějovice, Kingdom of Bohemia (now in the Czech Republic), was a Bohemian nobleman and the brother of Hieronymus von Colloredo-Waldsee. A member of the Colloredo family, he distinguished himself in the Thirty Years' War, especially at the Battles of Mantua and Lützen. Emperor Ferdinand III appointed him to the Imperial Privy Council and named him a Field Marshal. Although unable to prevent Prague Castle from falling to Sweden's Hans Christoff von Königsmarck, Colloredo-Waldsee's bold defense of Prague's old town halted the Swedish invasion of Bohemia on 26 July 1648 and saved the Habsburg's ancestral lands in Austria. After the war he built the Schönborn Palace in Prague, now home to the United States Embassy to the Czech Republic. He died in Prague on 24 February 1657.
