= Liechtenstein Palace (Malostranské náměstí, Prague) =

Historic building in Prague, Czechia

Coordinates: 50°05′17″N 14°24′07″E

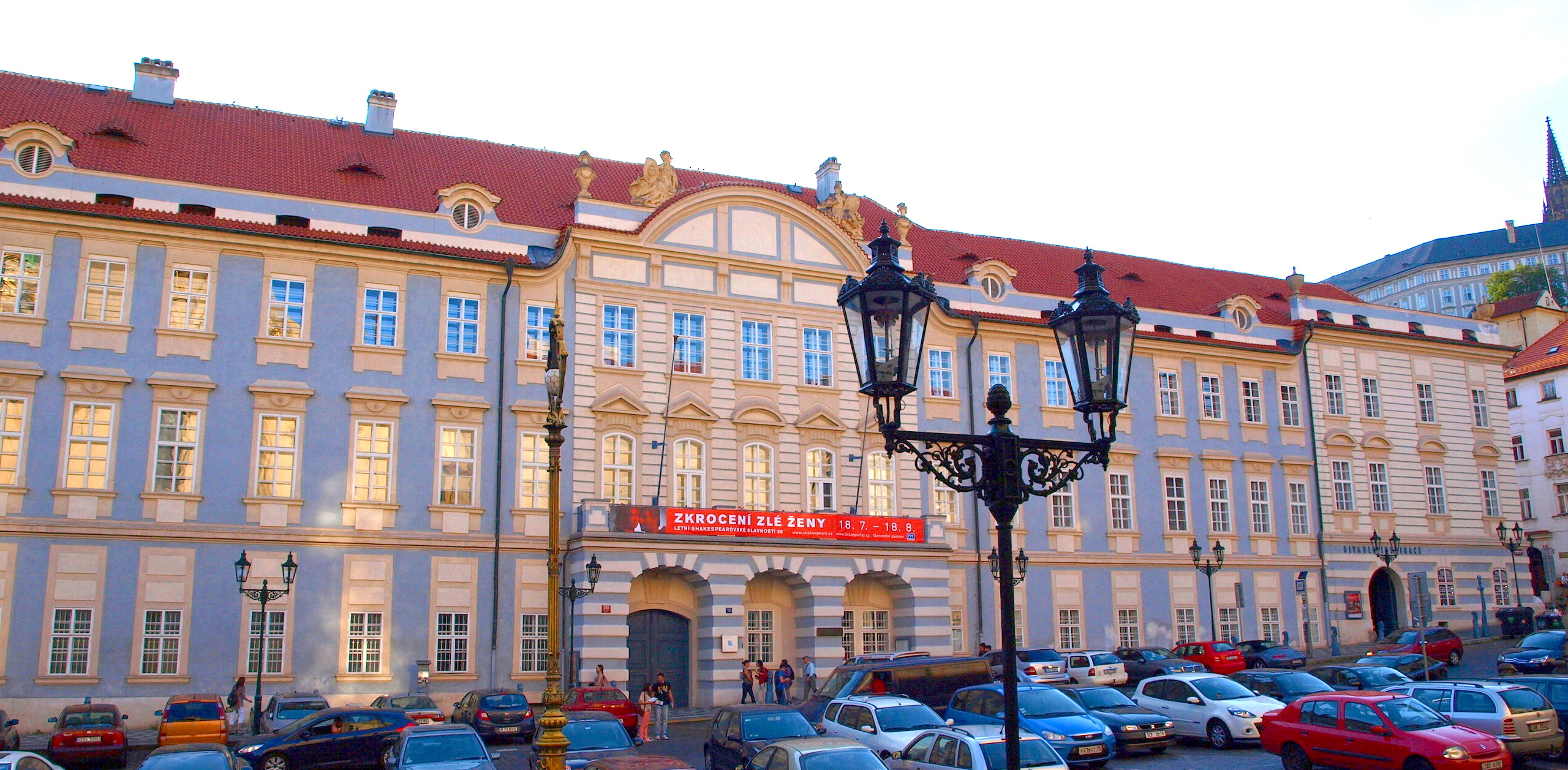
The palace in 2012

The Lichtenštejnský palác on Malostranské náměstí is one of two palaces in Prague that formerly belonged to the Princely Family of Liechtenstein. The other is the Liechtenstein Palace on Kampa Island in Prague.

The restored building now houses a music conservatory (the Academy of Performing Arts in Prague) and is often the venue for recitals and concerts. The Liechtenstein Palace on Kampa Island also occasionally hosts cultural events.
