= Liechtenstein Palace (Kampa Island, Prague) =

Palace on Kampa Island, Prague

Lichtenštejnský palác
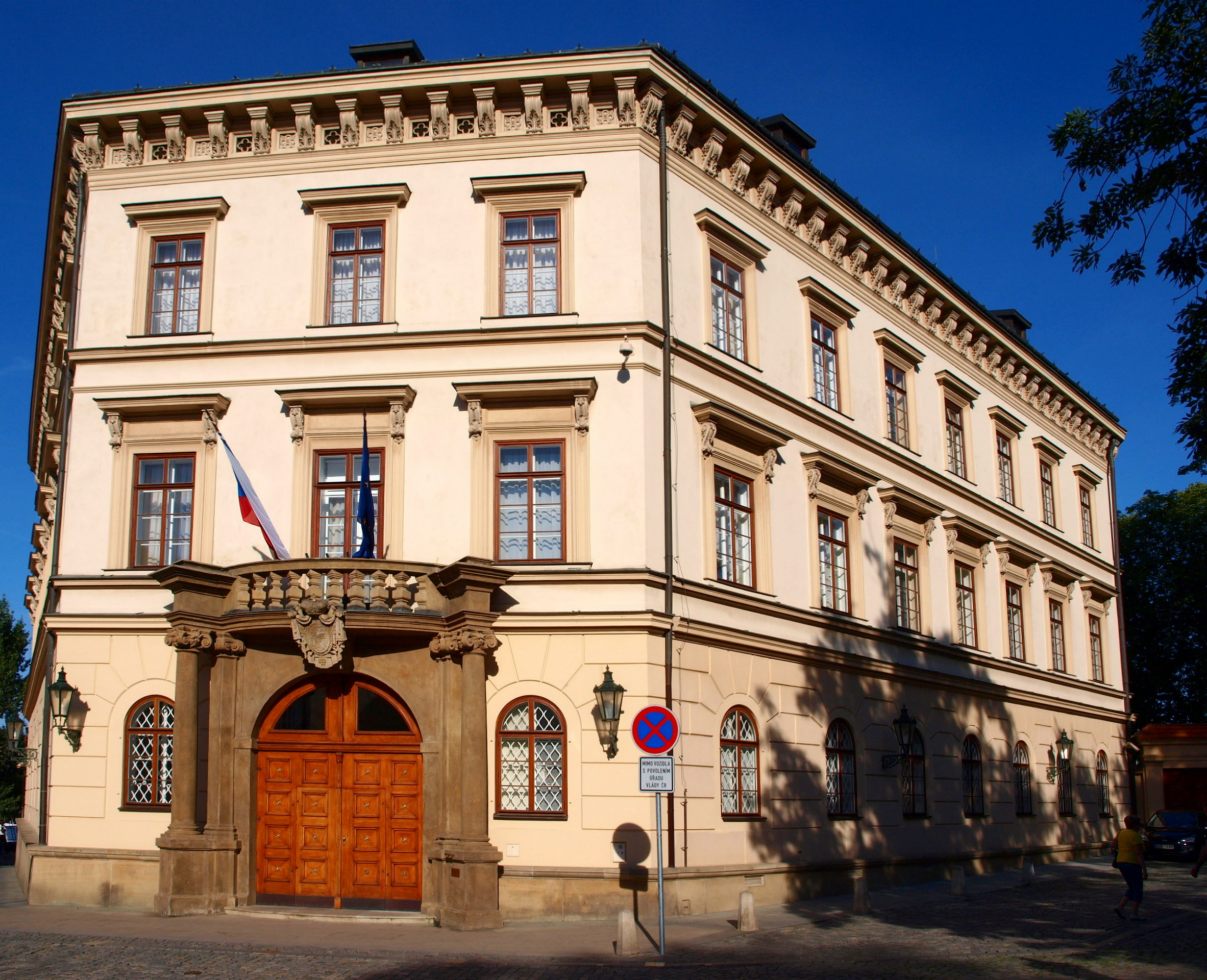
- Lichtenštejnský palác on Kampa Island
- Interactive map of the Lichtenštejnský palác area

General information
- Location: Prague, Czech Republic
- Coordinates: 50°05′08″N 14°24′32″E

The Lichtenštejnský palác on Kampa Island is one of two palaces in Prague that formerly belonged to the Princely Family of Liechtenstein.

The Kampa Island palace has occasionally hosted events, but it is the more centrally located "Lichtenštejnský palác", the Liechtenstein Palace on the Malostranské náměstí, now a music conservatory, which is better known as a concert venue.
