= Battle of Prague (1648) =

1648 battle of the Thirty Years' War

- Part of the Thirty Years' War
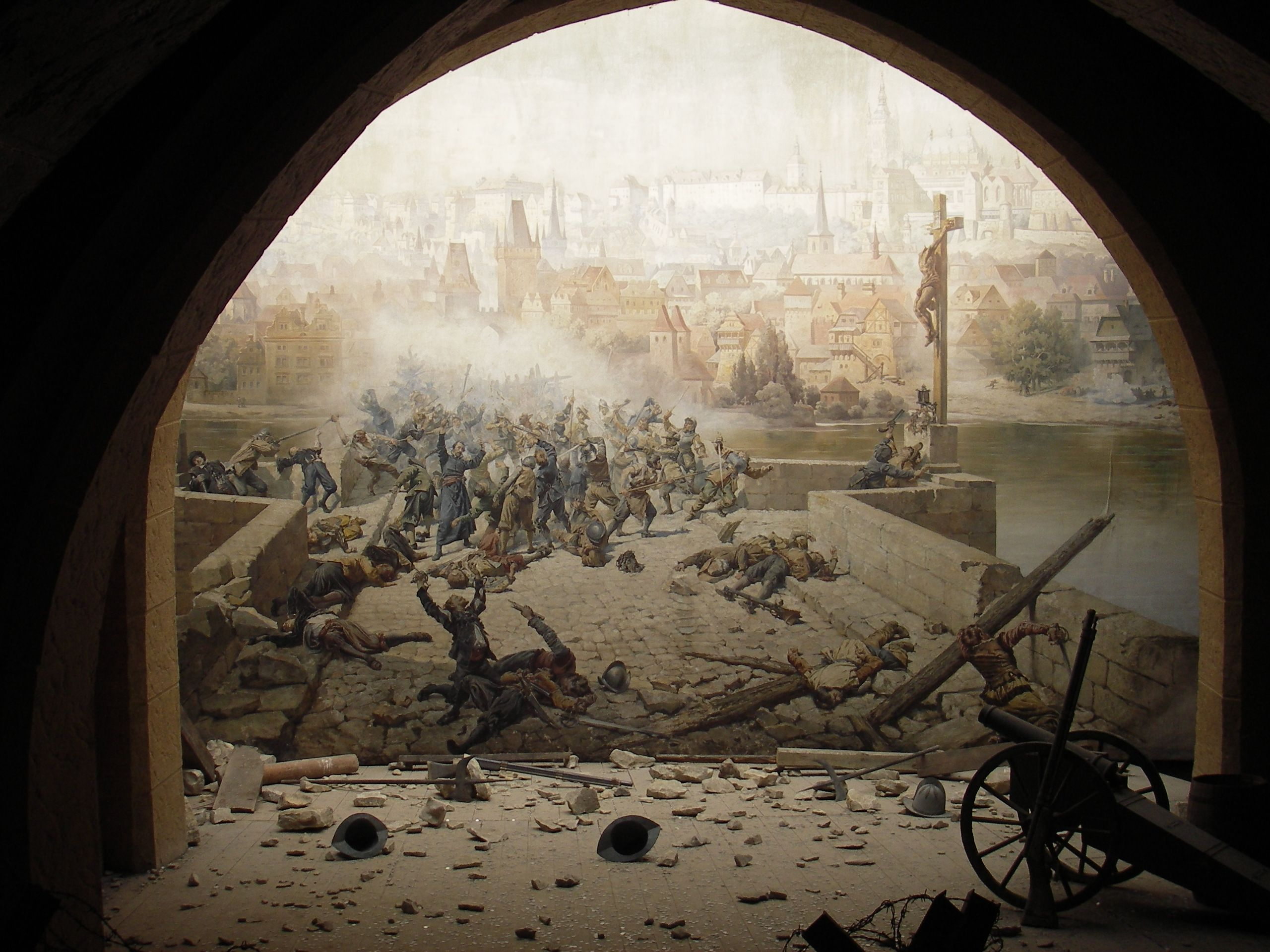
- Swedes on the Charles Bridge. A diorama created in 1891 by brothers Karel and Adolf Liebscher depicts the highlights of stubborn defense of right-bank Prague by students led by the Jesuit Jiří Plachý
Date	25 July – 1 November 1648
Location	Prague, Kingdom of Bohemia, Habsburg monarchy (now the Czech Republic) 50°05′11″N 14°24′44″E
Result	Indecisive: Sack of left-bank part of Prague (incl. the Prague Castle); Failure to capture the right bank (Old and New Town) and Swedish retreat

Belligerents
(yes) Swedish Empire	Bohemia

Commanders and leaders
(yes) Hans Christoff von Königsmarck; (yes) Prince Carl Gustaf; (yes) Arvid Wittenberg; (Swedish Empire) Ernst Odowalsky	Count Rudolph Colloredo-Wallsee; Jiří Plachý; Hans Georg Kauffer

Strength
c. 7,500 soldiers (unconfirmed), plus 6,000 reinforcements led by Prince Carl Gustav	c. 2,000 soldiers, plus local militia and university students

Casualties and losses
500 dead, 700 wounded	219 dead, 475 wounded

The Battle of Prague, which occurred between 25 July and 1 November 1648 was the last action of the Thirty Years' War. While the negotiations for the Peace of Westphalia were proceeding, Sweden took the opportunity to mount one last campaign into Bohemia. The main result, and probably the main aim, was to loot the fabulous art collection assembled in Prague Castle by Rudolf II, Holy Roman Emperor (1552–1612), the pick of which was taken down the Elbe in barges and shipped to Sweden.

After holding the castle and the western bank of the Vltava for several months, the Swedes halted their attacks on the Old and New Town on the eastern bank once word arrived that the treaty had been signed. They nevertheless maintained a garrison on the western side until their final withdrawal on 30 September 1649.

It was the last major clash of the Thirty Years' War, taking place in the city of Prague, where the war originally began 30 years earlier with the Third Defenestration of Prague.

== Overview ==
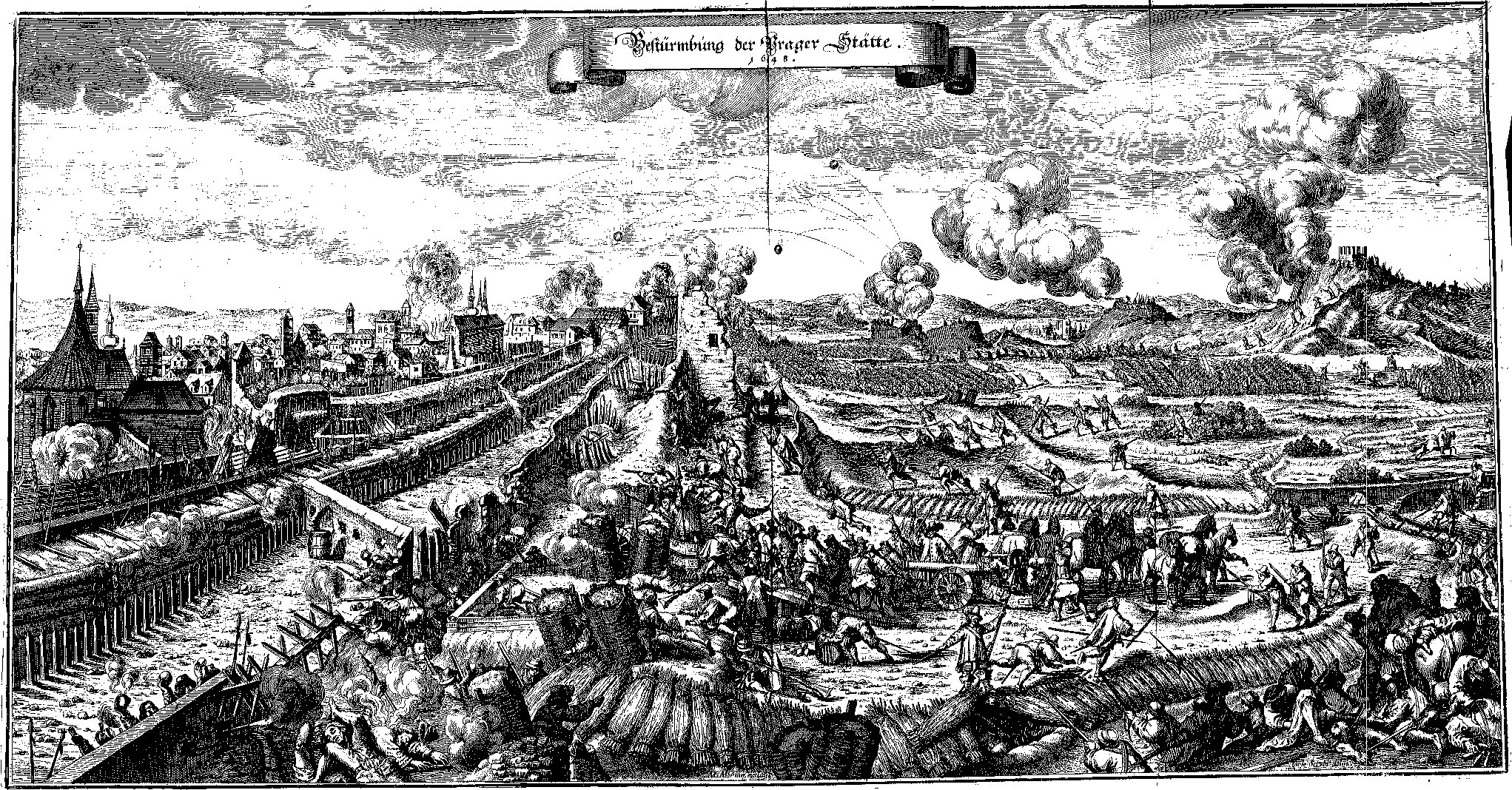
Swedish assault on the New Town of Prague in October 1648, by Matthäus Merian

General Hans Christoff von Königsmarck, commanding Sweden's flying column, entered the city, which was defended by the Governor Feldmarschall Rudolf von Colloredo, a veteran of the siege of Mantua and of the battle of Lutzen, where he served under Albrecht von Wallenstein. The Swedes, by a sudden night raid targeting a wall deemed weak due to ongoing construction, managed to enter the whole part of Prague on the western bank of the Vltava river – i.e., Prague Castle and quarters Hradčany and Lesser Town. They then rushed to Strahovská gate, where they killed the guards and opened the gate, allowing Königsmark and other Swedish divisions to easily enter the town. Two days later, they attempted to enter the Old Town on the eastern bank of the river, but were repulsed on the Charles Bridge by Colloredo's men. When a third Swedish army commanded by Prince Carl Gustaf came close to Prague (25 September), all three Swedish armies launched a number of attacks against the city – not only from the west, via the Charles Bridge, but also from the north (bombardment from the Letná Plain) and especially from the eastern plains, towards another city quarter, the New Town. These attacks were repelled largely thanks to the skill of the Feldmarschall and the energy of his troops, as well as the fierce resistance of the burghers' militia and student volunteer troops (Academic Legion) under Czech Jesuit priest Jiří Plachý and German priest jurist Hans Georg Kauffer.

=== Sack of Prague ===
The looting of Lesser town, Hrad town, and the castle began immediately after the assault on the left bank had begun; some historians have argued that this was the main purpose of the raid. Many of the treasures collected by Emperor Rudolf II (such as the Codex Gigas and Codex Argenteus) were taken to Sweden, where some can be found in Drottningholm Palace, for example, several statues by Adrien de Vries. However, before these could be taken to northern Germany, they had to wait for peacetime. Not all treasure made it to Stockholm either; many ordinary soldiers managed to take treasures. The cream of the artworks were taken into exile by Christina, Queen of Sweden (r. 1632–1654), and dispersed in groups after her death in 1689, the paintings forming the core of the Orleans Collection, which was sold in London after the French Revolution, so that many of Rudolf's paintings are now in the United Kingdom. A Swedish inventory of 1652 lists 472 paintings as having come from Prague.

== Monuments ==
On the Old Town Square a Marian column was erected to remember the salvation of Prague.

A monument erected during the 19th century on Colloredo's tomb in the Church of the Maltese Order in Prague recalls his victory over the Swedes. Its German inscription reads thus:

HIER RUHT RUDOLF GRAF COLLOREDO K.K. FELDMARSCHALL UND MALTHESERORDER GROSSPRIOR Vertheidiger der Alt und Neusstad Prags gegen die Schweden Geb. am 2 Nov. 1585 Gest. am 27 Jan. 1657.

("Here lies Rudolf, count Colloredo, Imperial and Royal Feldmarshall and Grand Prior of the Order of Malta, defender of the Old and New Town of Prague against the Swedes. Born 2. Nov. 1585 Dead 27 Jan. 1657")

On Charles Bridge tower a 17th-century Latin inscription says:

SISTE VIATOR, SED LUBENS, AC VOLENS UBI SISTERE DEBUIT, SED COACTUS GOTHORUM, AC VANDALORUM FUROR

"Rest here, walker, and be happy: you can stop here willing, but unwilling were stopped the Goths (Swedes) and their Vandalic ferocity"
