= List of foreign regiments of the French Royal Army =

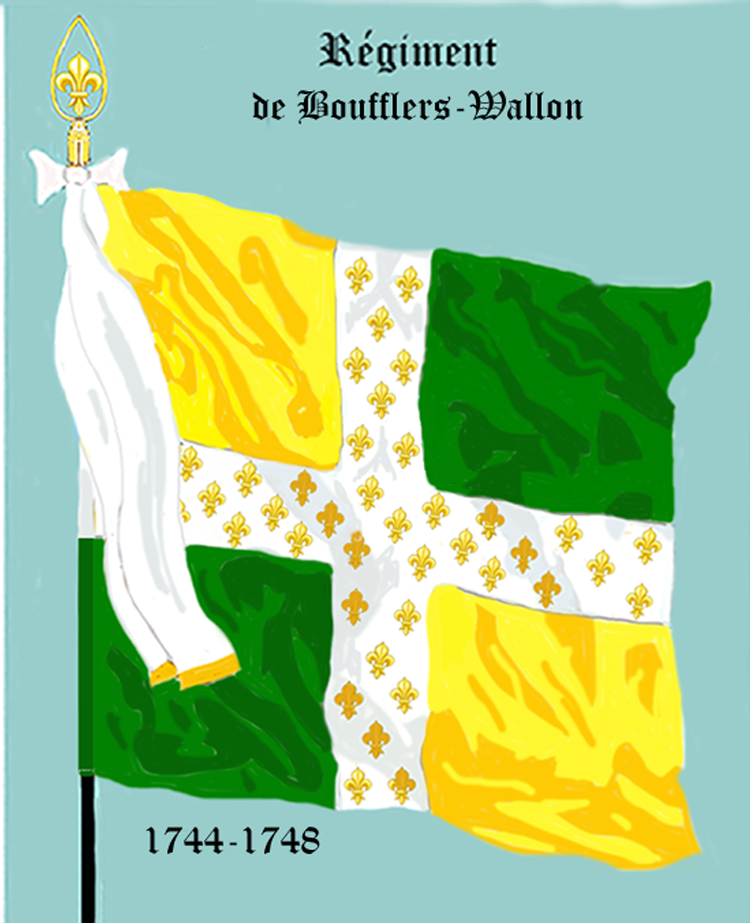
Company colour of Régiment de Boufflers-Wallon

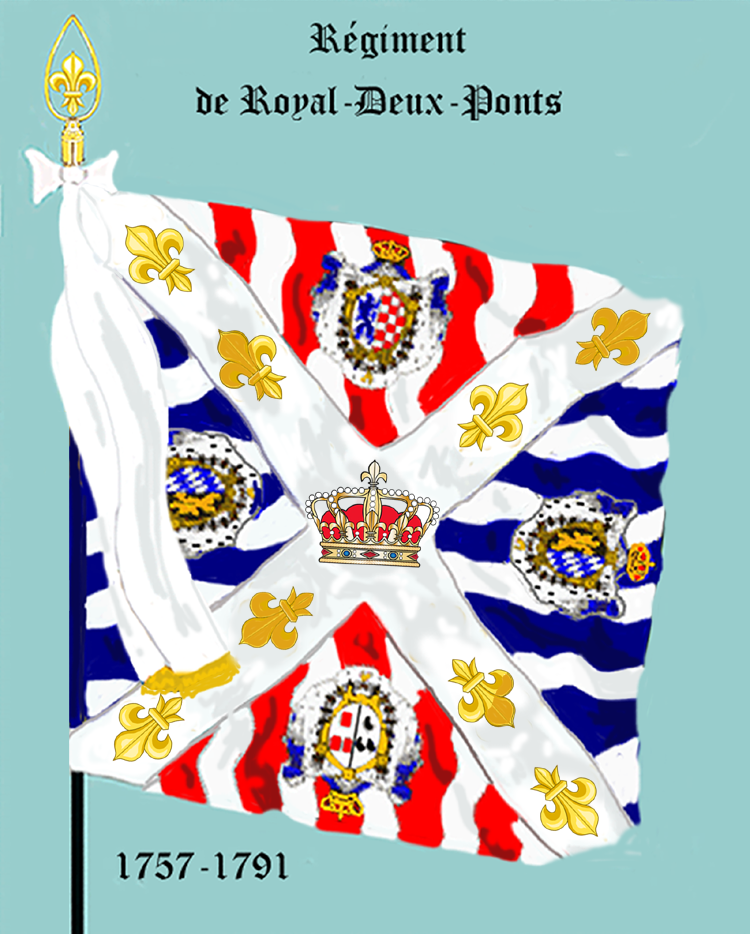
Company colour Régiment de Royal-Deux-Ponts

Several foreign regiments of the French Royal Army were raised during the 17th and 18th centuries. Coming mainly from Switzerland, Germany, Ireland, and Wallonia they gave a significant contribution to the French military effort. Swedish and Polish regiments were counted as German, Scottish as Irish. After the French Revolution the foreign regiments were in 1791 merged with the indigenous French regiments to new, numbered, regiments of the line.

== Danish regiments ==
Régiment de Yoel
Raised 1690 → 1692: Régiment de Royal Danois (disbanded 1698)

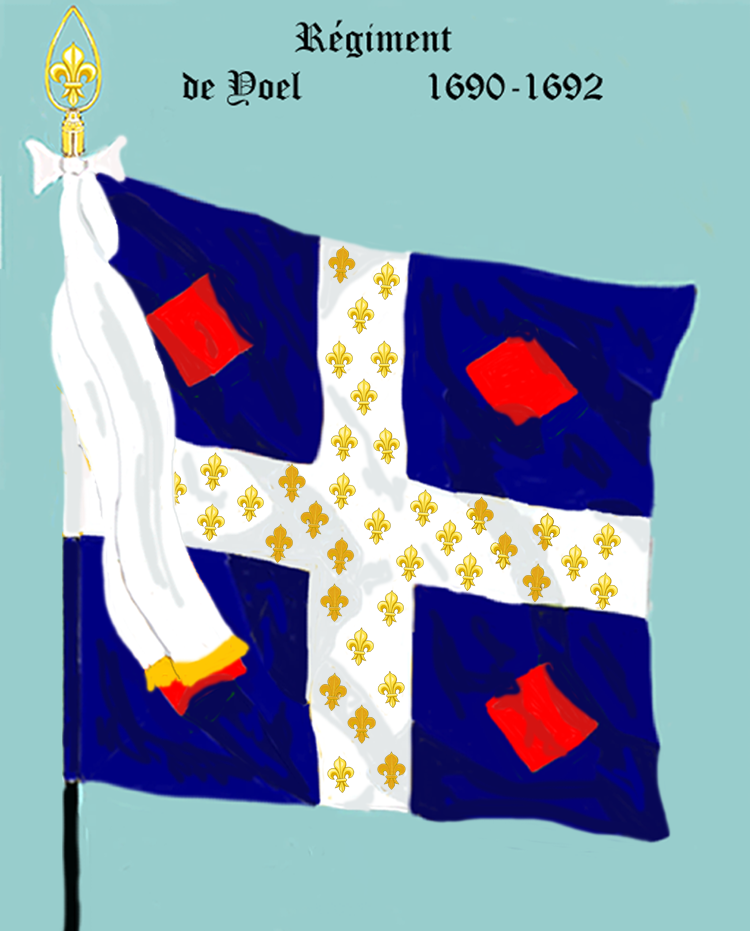
Régt Yoel and Régt Royal Danois

== Irish regiments ==
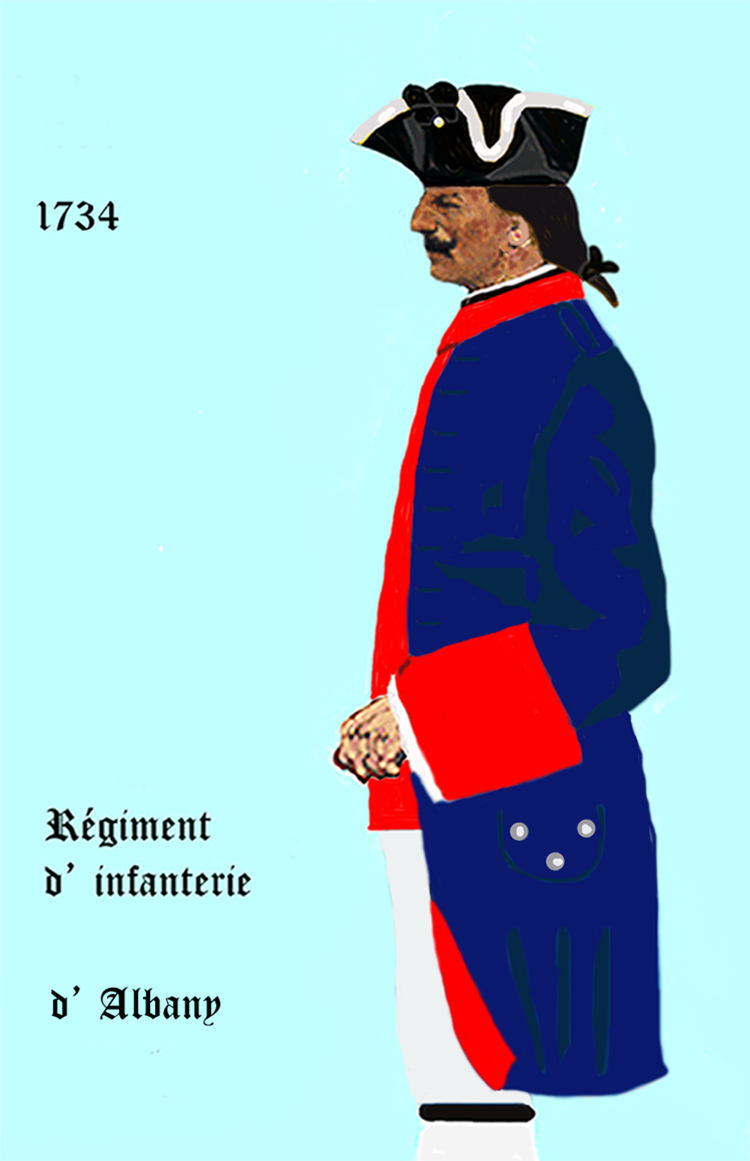
Régiment d’Albany

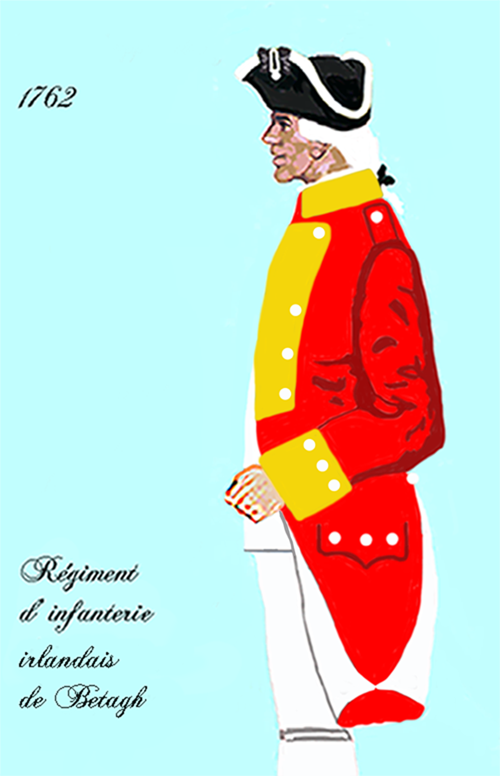
Régiment de Betagh

Régiment de Berwick
Raised 1698
→ 1791: 88ème régiment d’infanterie de ligne

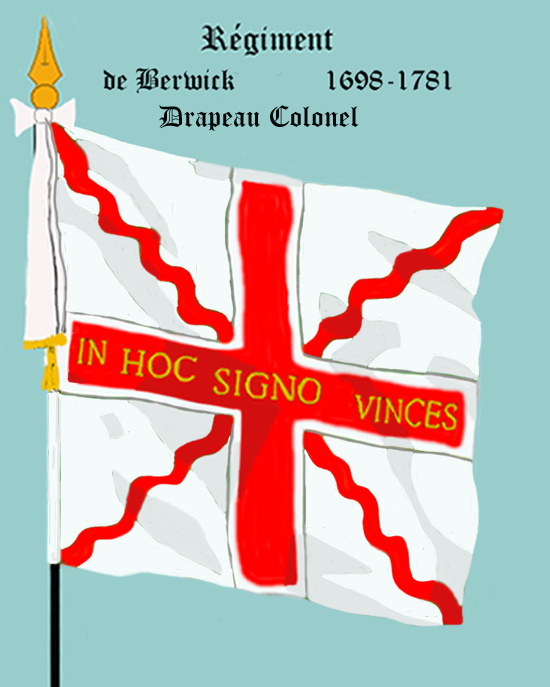
Colonel 1698

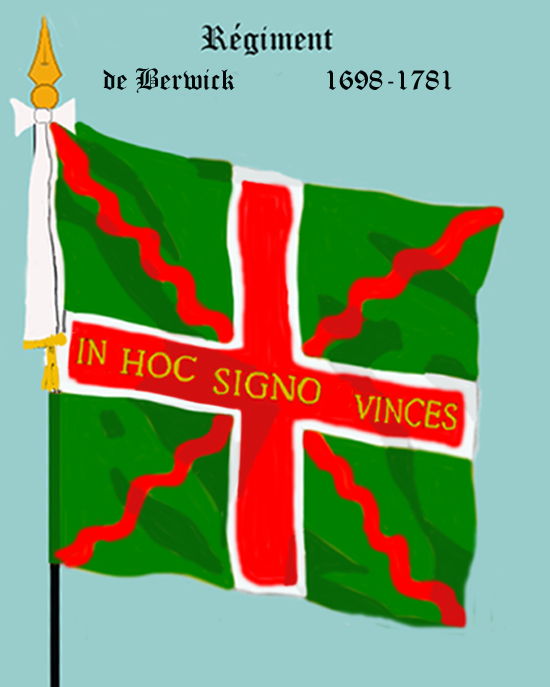
Régiment de Berwick

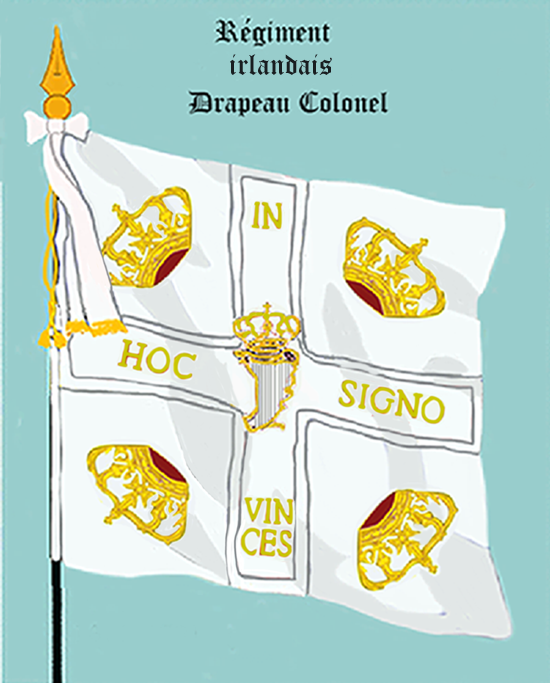
Colonel 1781

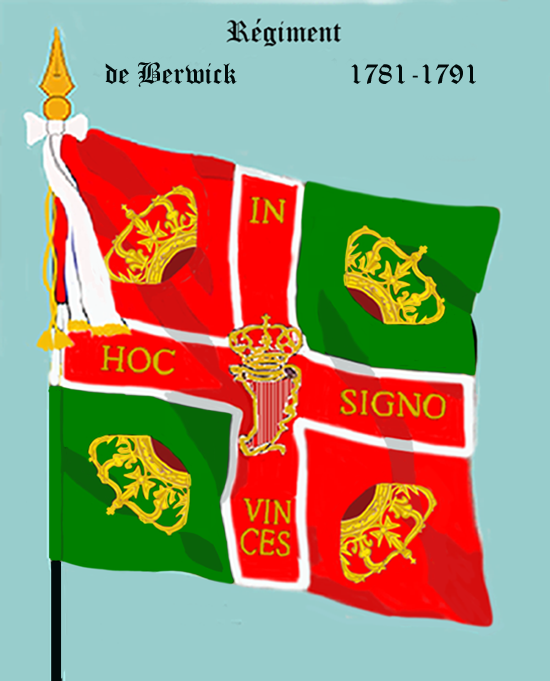
Berwick 1781

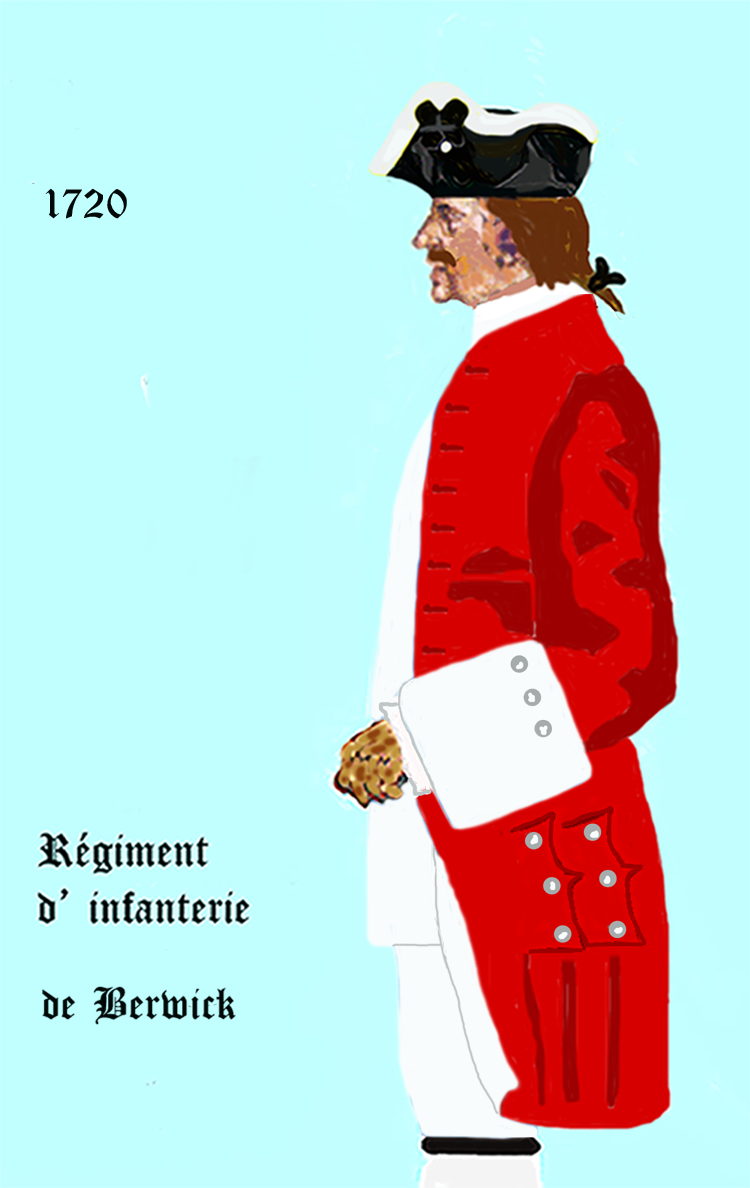
Berwick 1720

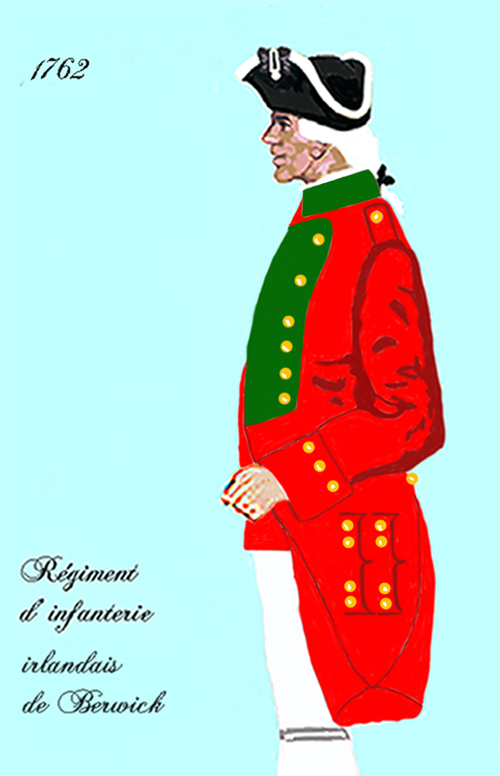
Berwick 1762

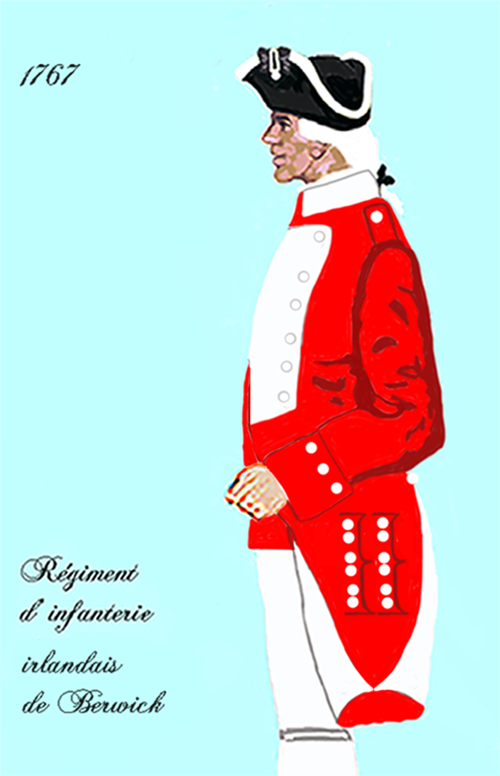
Berwick 1767

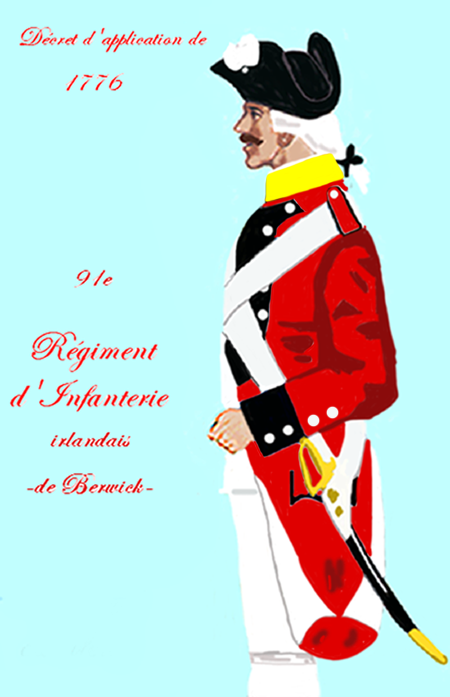
Berwick 1776

Régiment de Dillon
Raised 1690
→ 1791: 87ème régiment d’infanterie de ligne

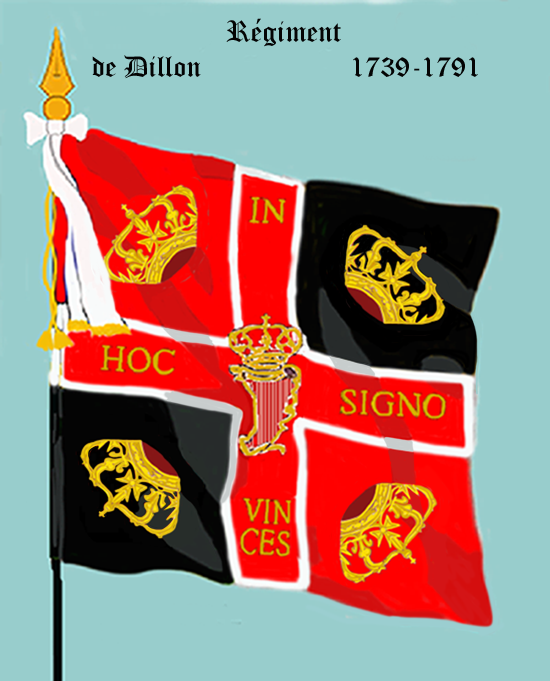
Dillon

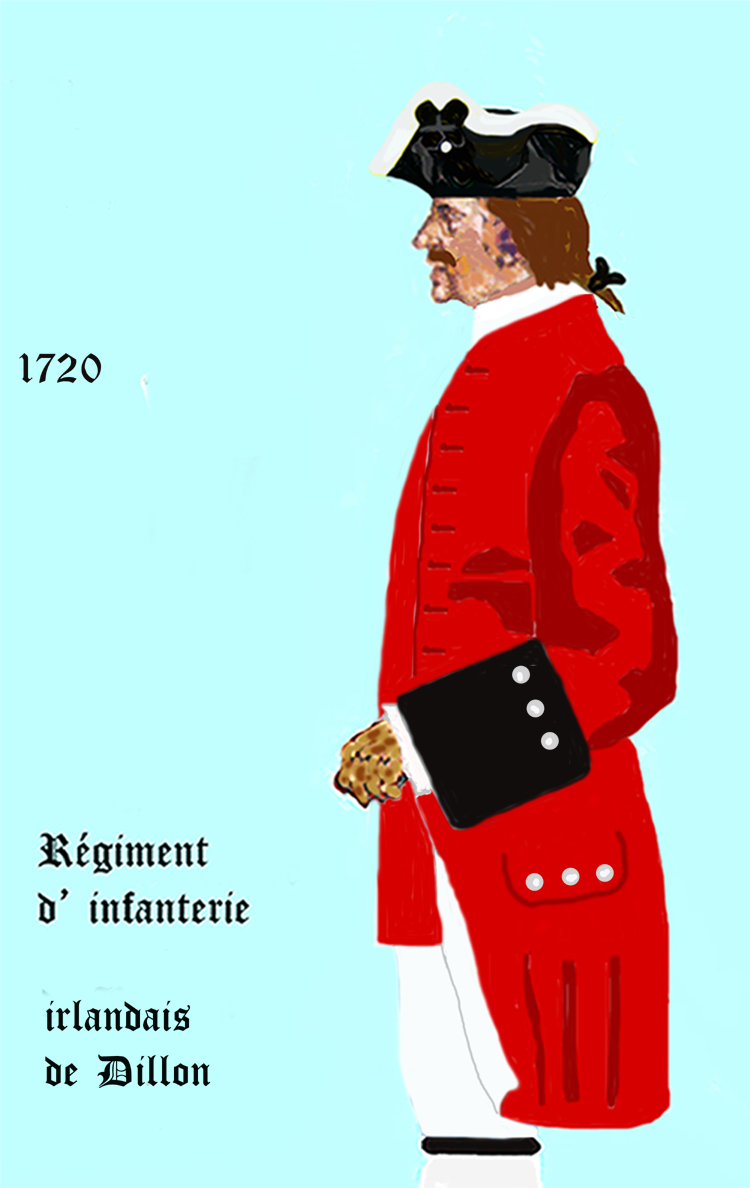
Dillon 1720

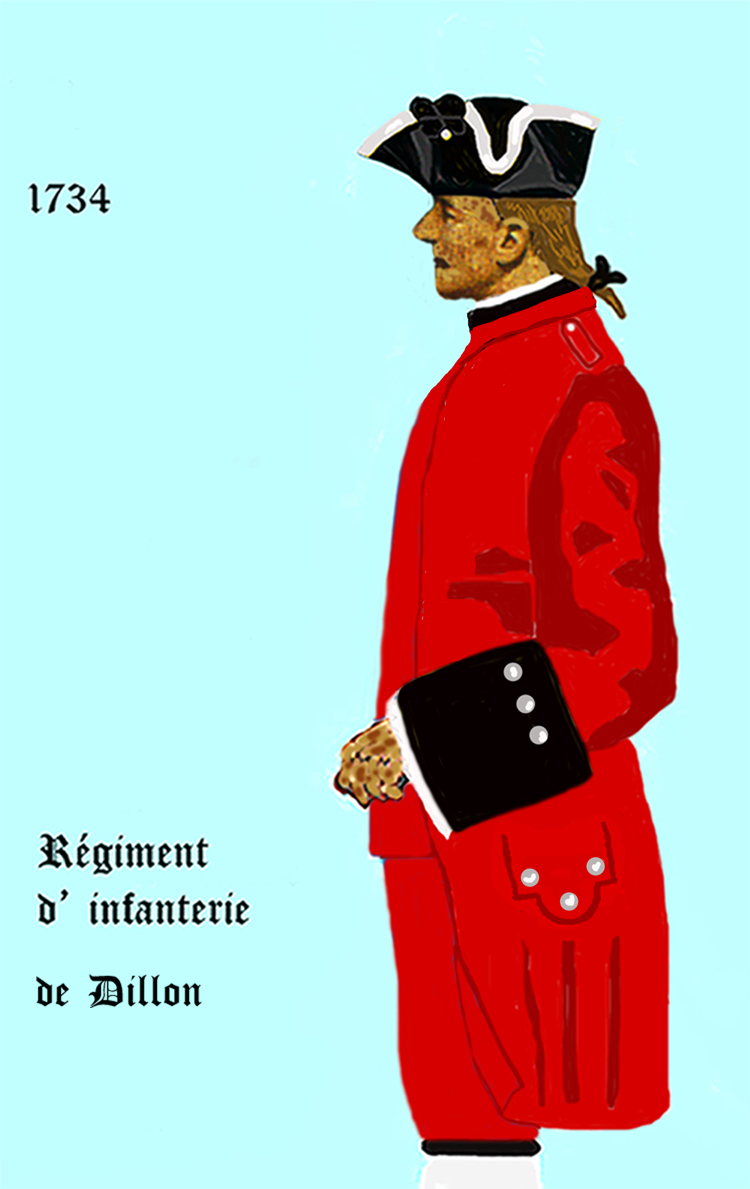
Dillon 1734

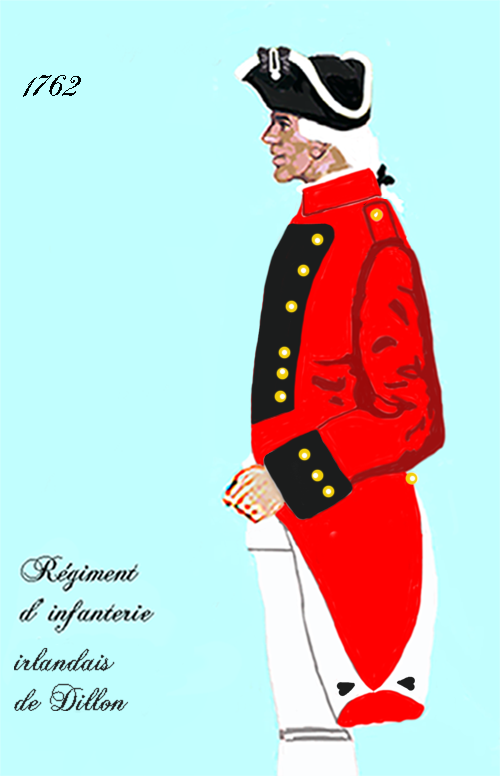
Dillon 1762

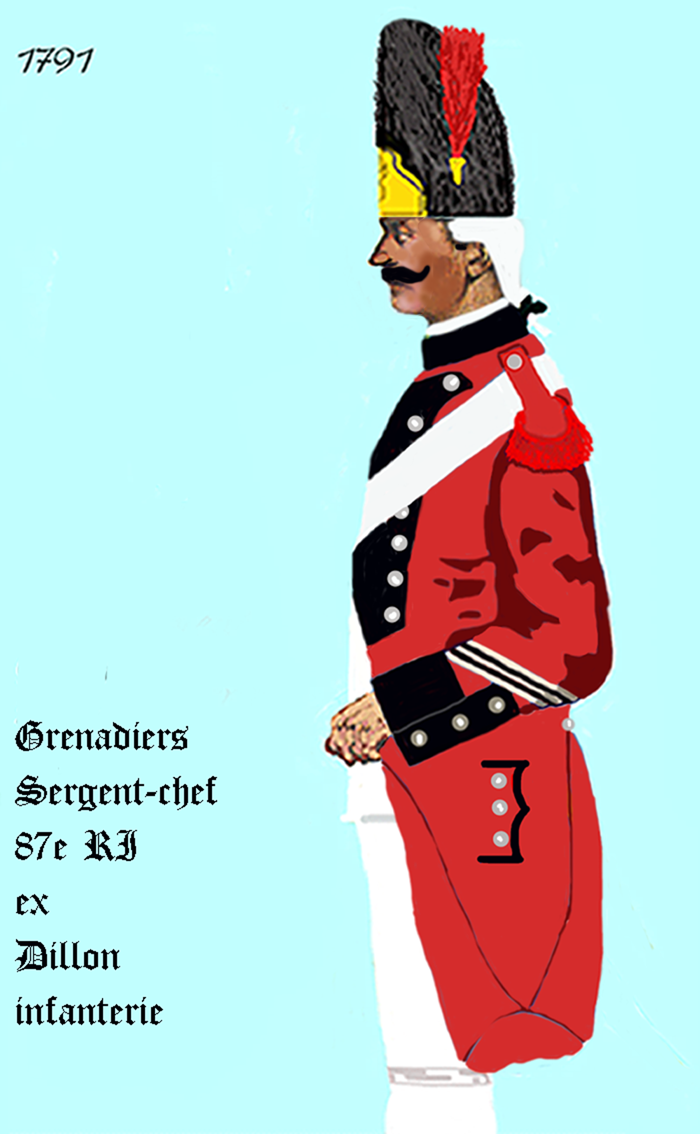
Dillon 1791

Régiment de Clare
Raised 1691
→ 1691: Régiment de Clare
→ 1694: Régiment de Lee
→ 1730: Régiment de Bulkeley
→ 1775: Merged with Régiment de Dillon

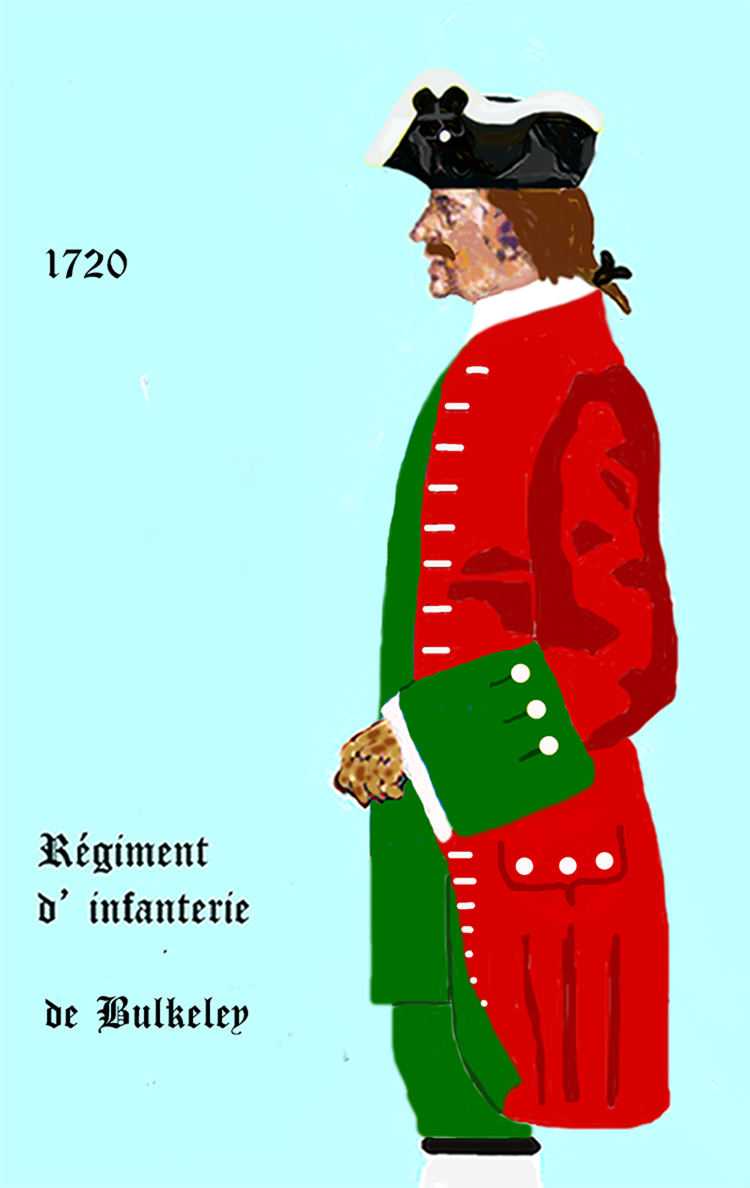
Bulkeley 1720

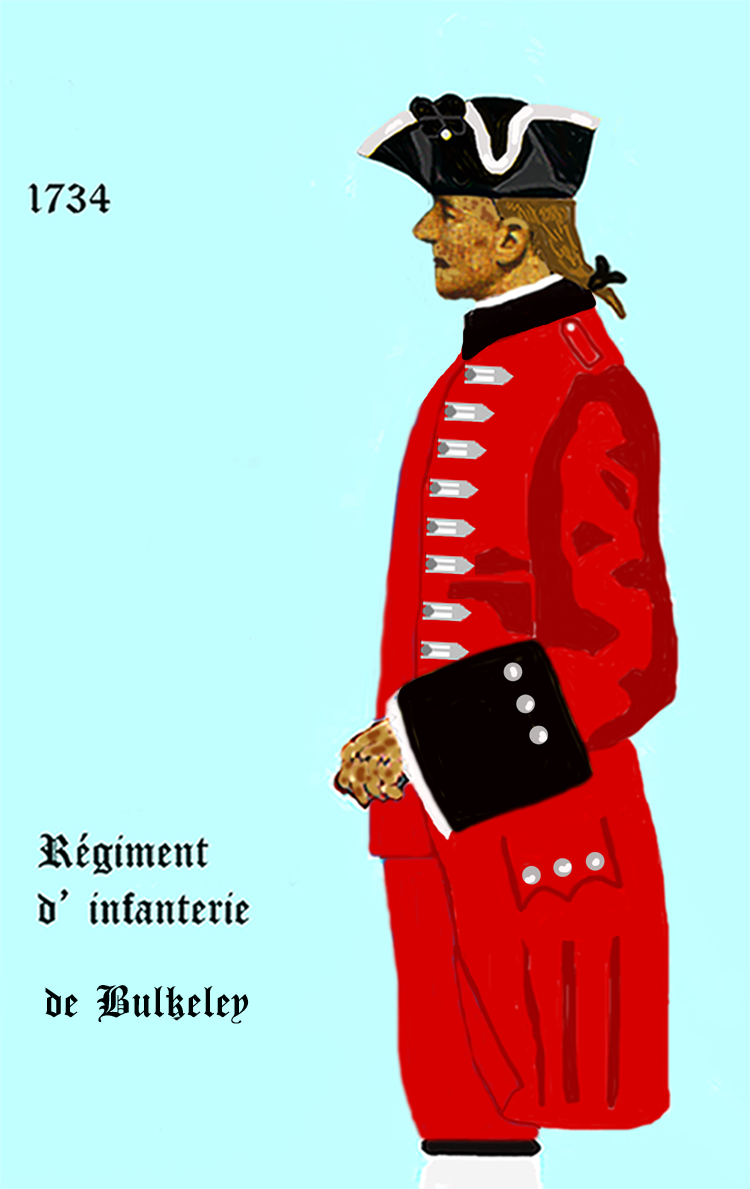
Bulkeley 1734

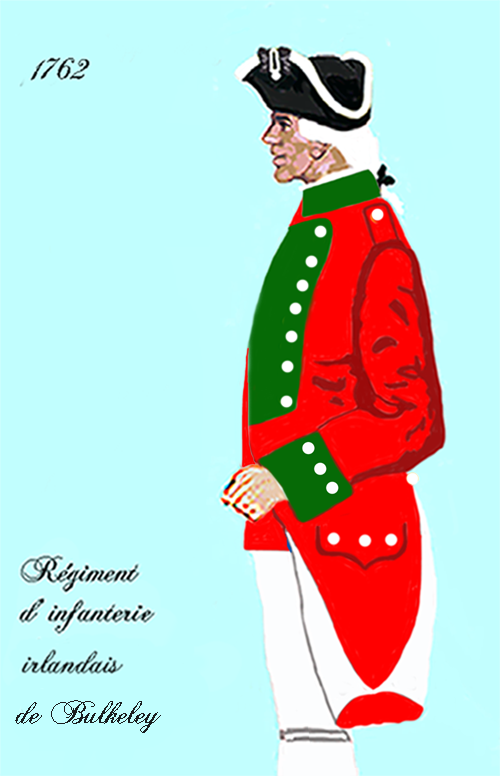
Bulkeley 1762

Régiment d' O'Brien
Raised 1689
→ 1706: Régiment d' O'Brien
→ 1720: Règiment de Clare
→ 1775: Merged with Régiment de Berwick

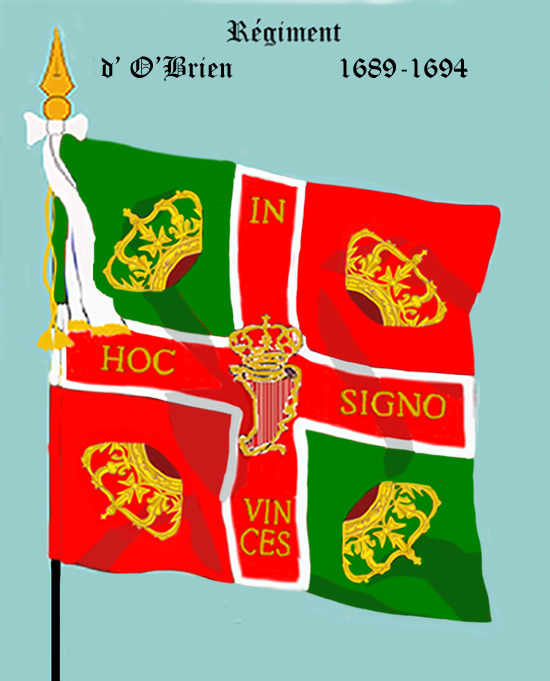

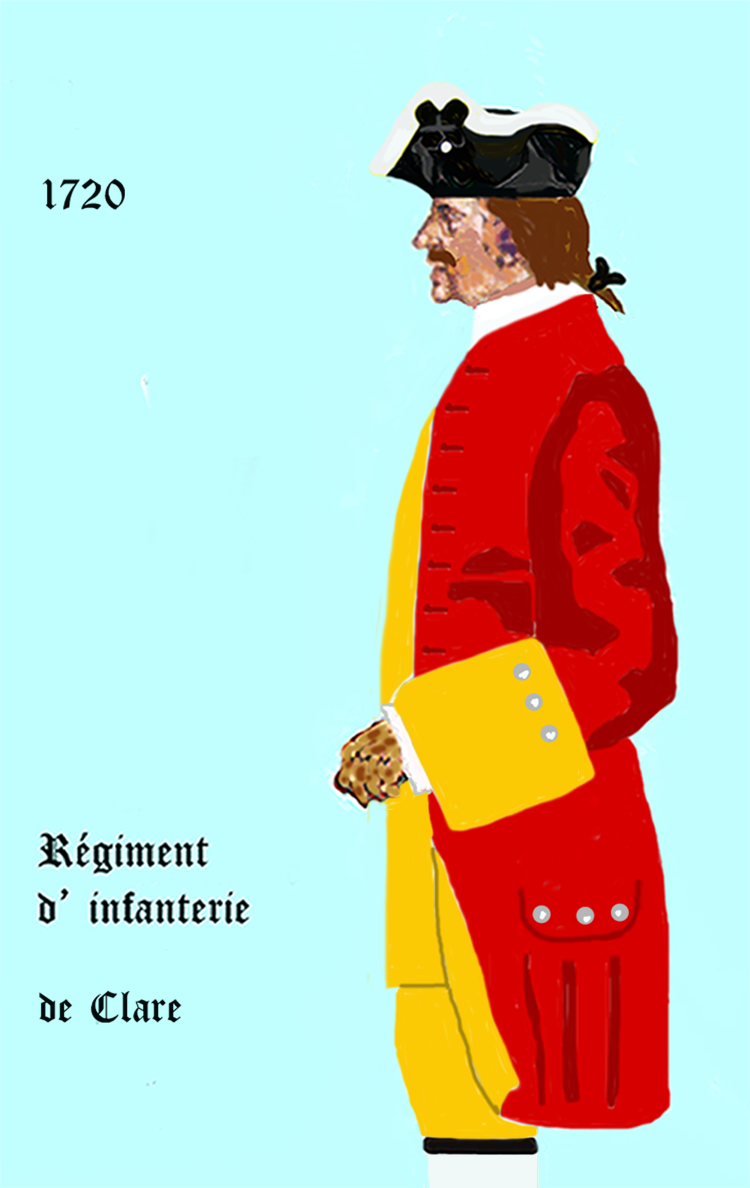
Clare 1720

Régiment de Dorrington
Raised 1698
→ 1718: Régiment de Rooth
→ 1766: Régiment de Roscommon
→ 1770: Régiment de Walsh
→ 1791: 92ème régiment d’infanterie de ligne

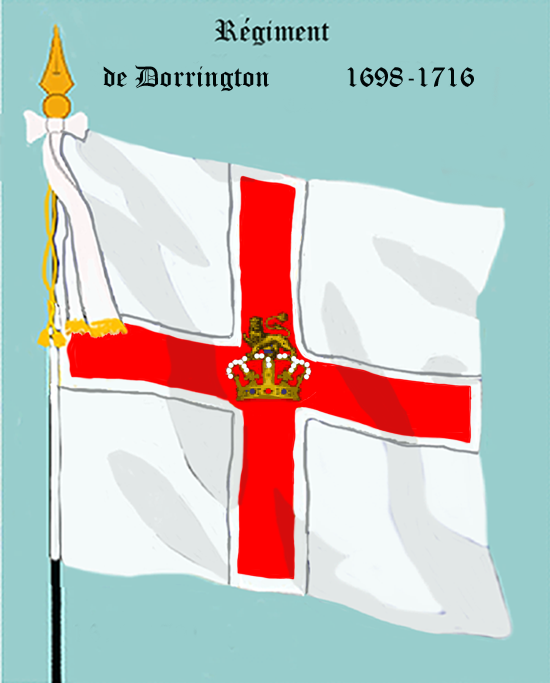
Rég Dorrington and all successors

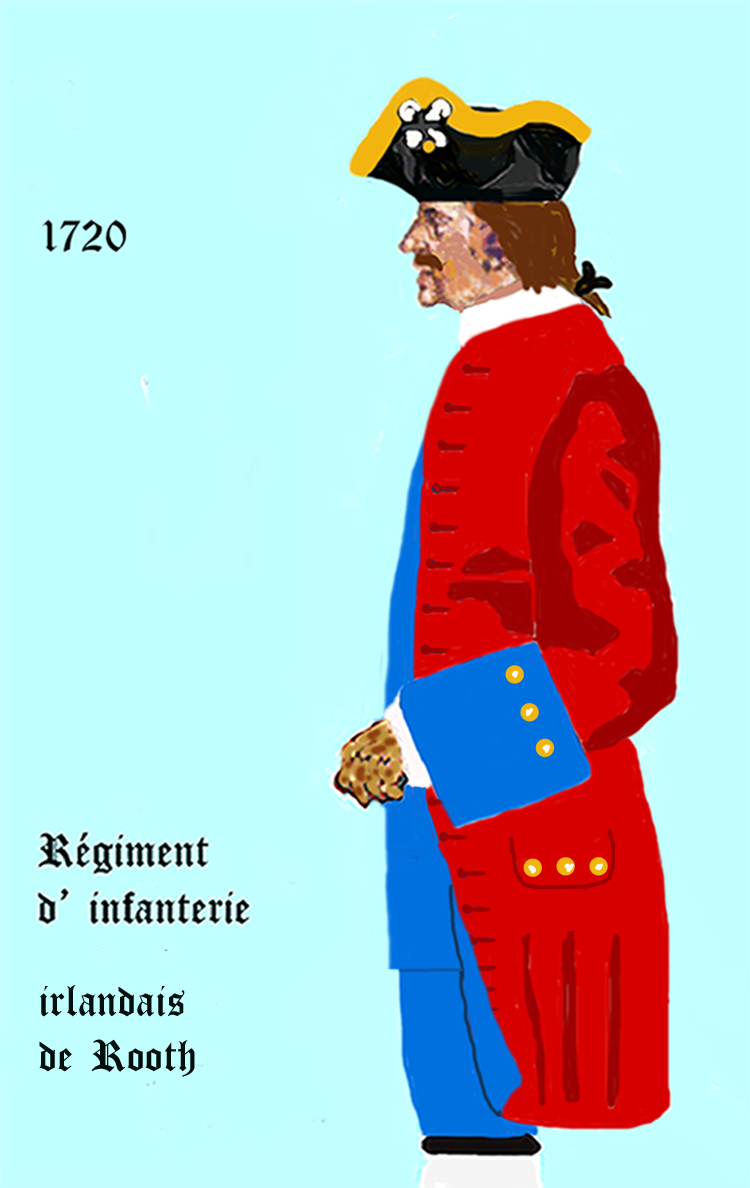
Rooth 1720

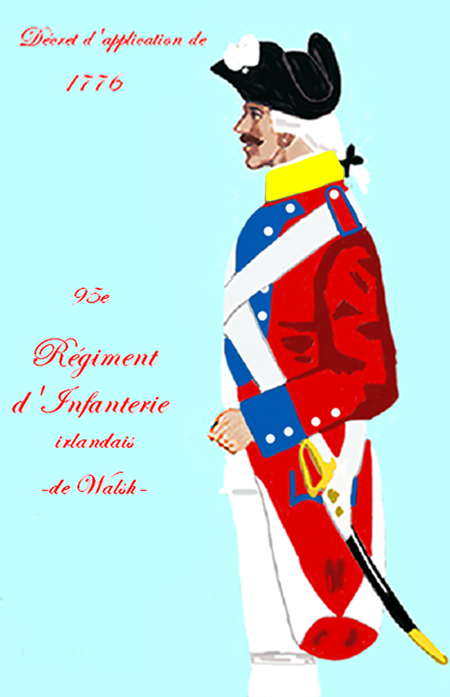
Walsh 1776

Régiment de Lally
Raised 1744
→ 1762: Merged with Régiment de Dillon

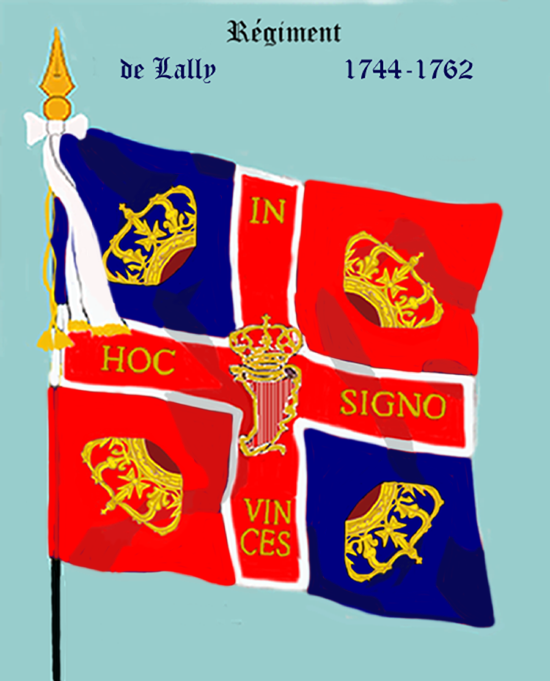
Lally

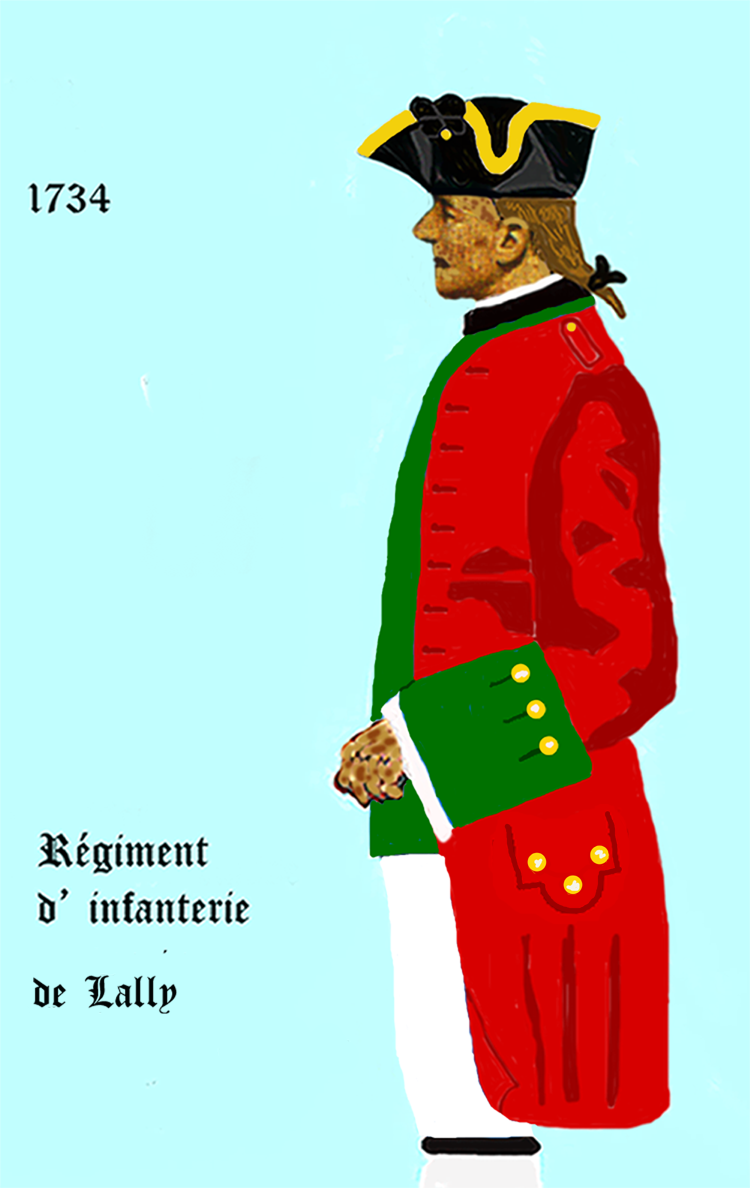
Lally 1744

Régiment d’Ogilvy
Raised 1747
→ 1770: Merged with Régiment de Clare

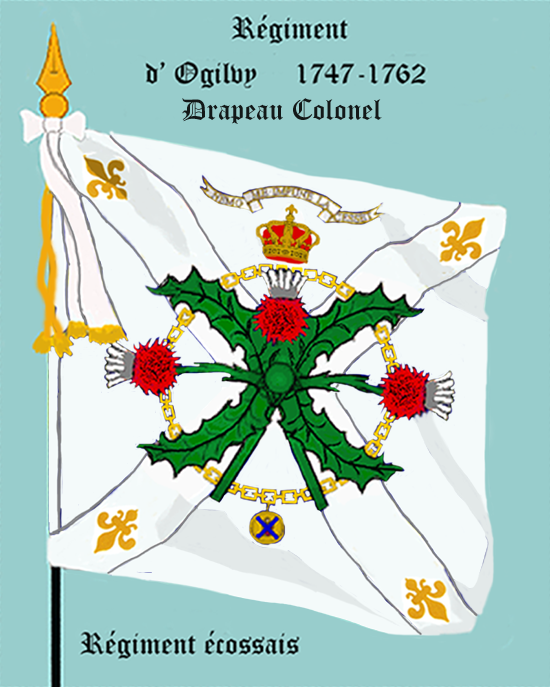
Ogilvy Colonel

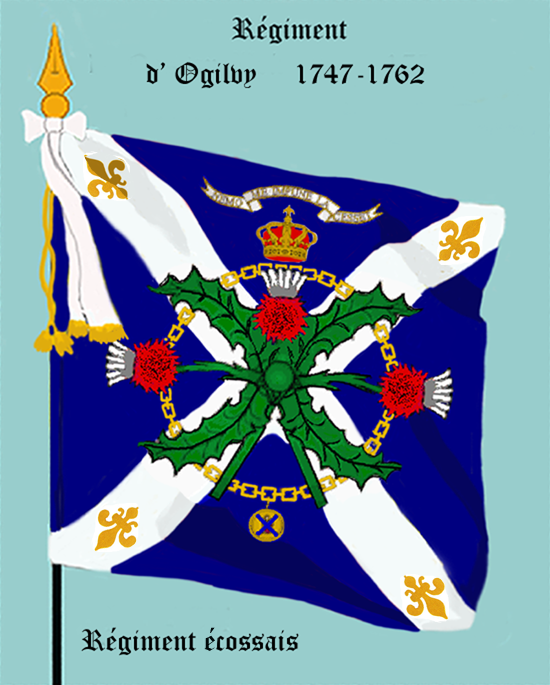
Ogilvy

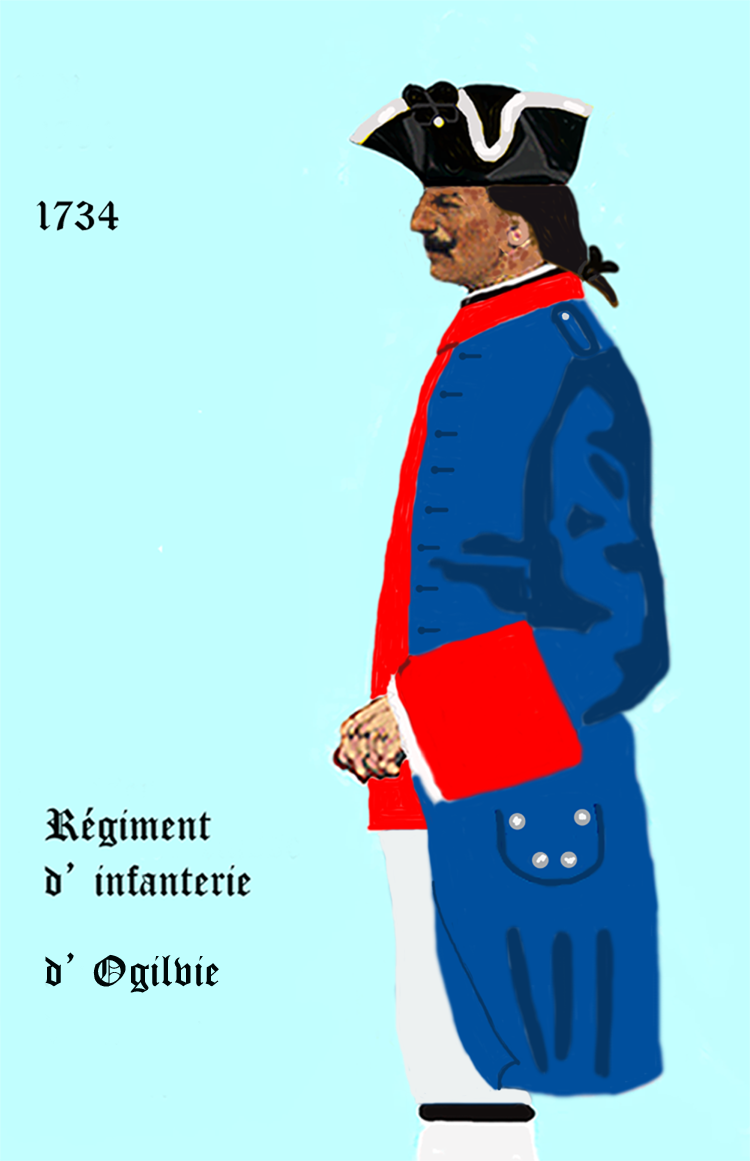
Ogilvy 1747

Régiment de Royal Écossais
Raised 1744
→ 1762: Merged with Régiment de Bulkeley

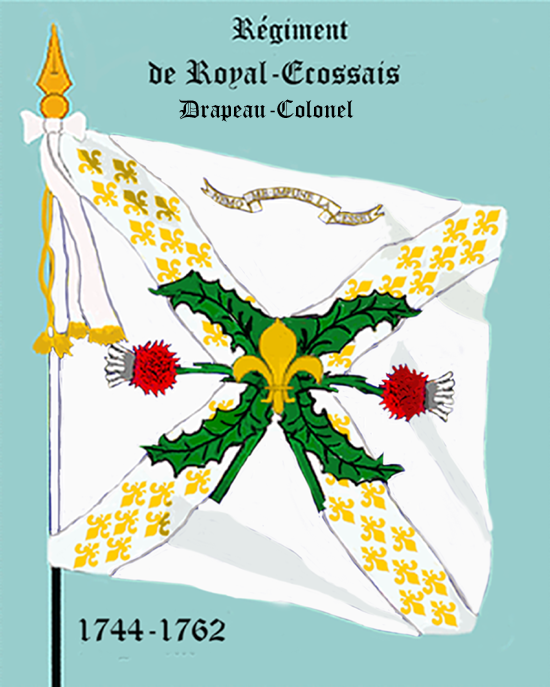
Royal Ecossais - Colonel

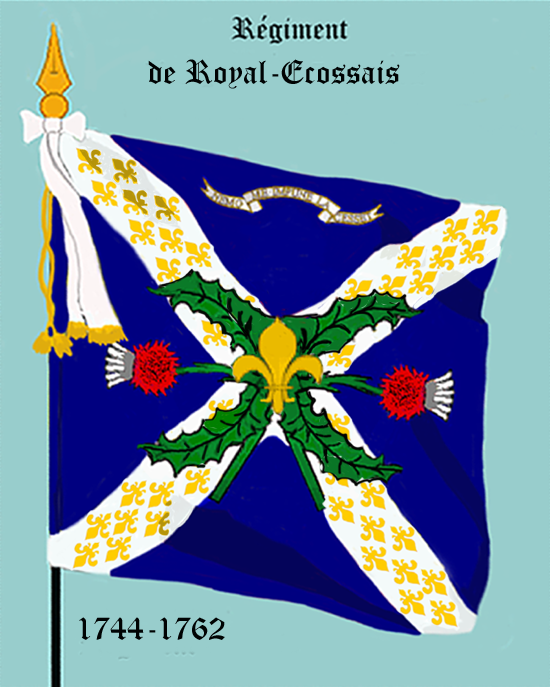
Royal Ecossais

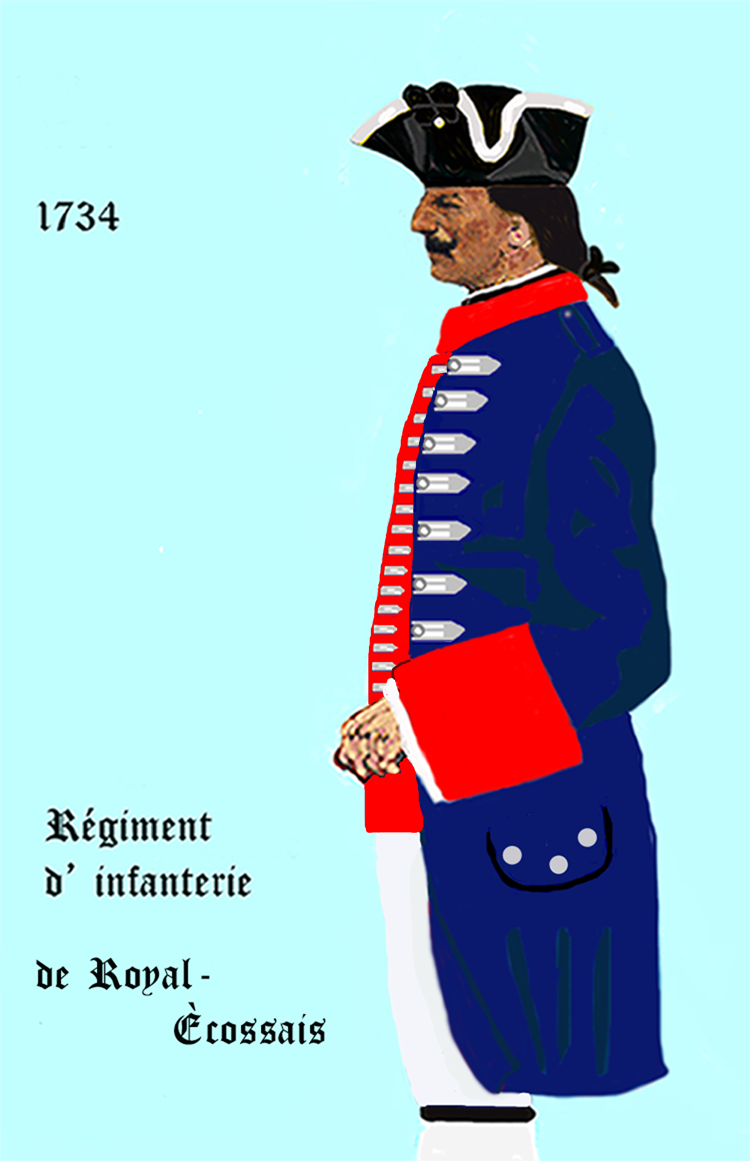
Royal Ecossais 1743/44 - 1757

== Wallonian regiments ==
Régiment de Solre
Raised 1698
→ 1711: Régiment de Beaufort
→ 1721: Régiment de Bouffler
→ 1727: Régiment de La Valliére
→ 1741: Régiment de Guise
→ 1747: Régiment d’Escars
→ 1749: Merged with Régiment de Tournaisis (French regiment)

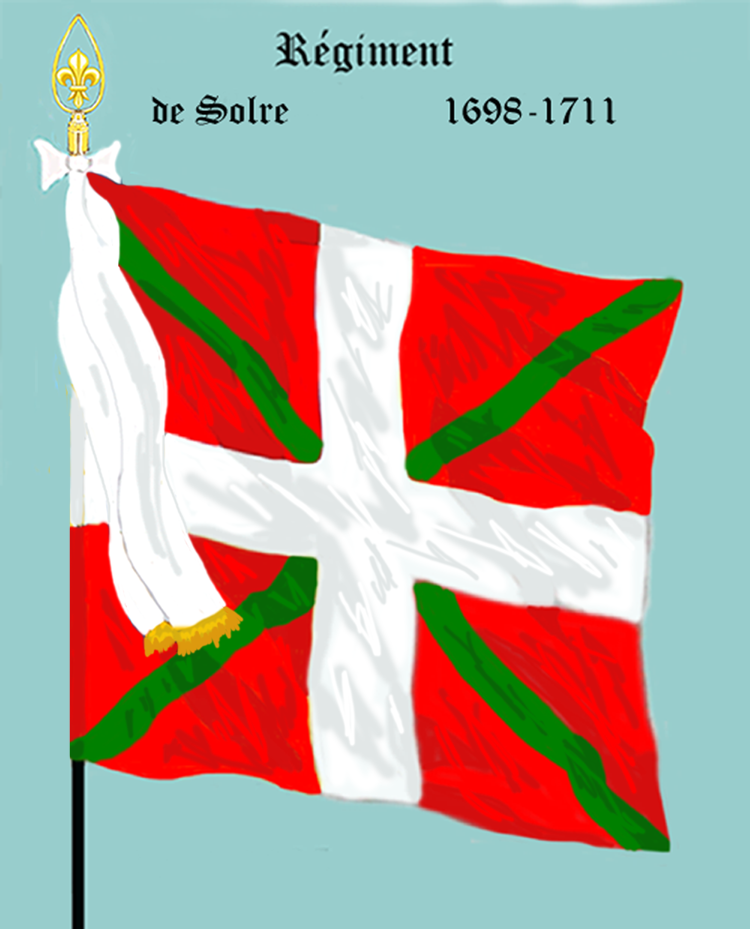
Rég Solre till Rég La Valliére

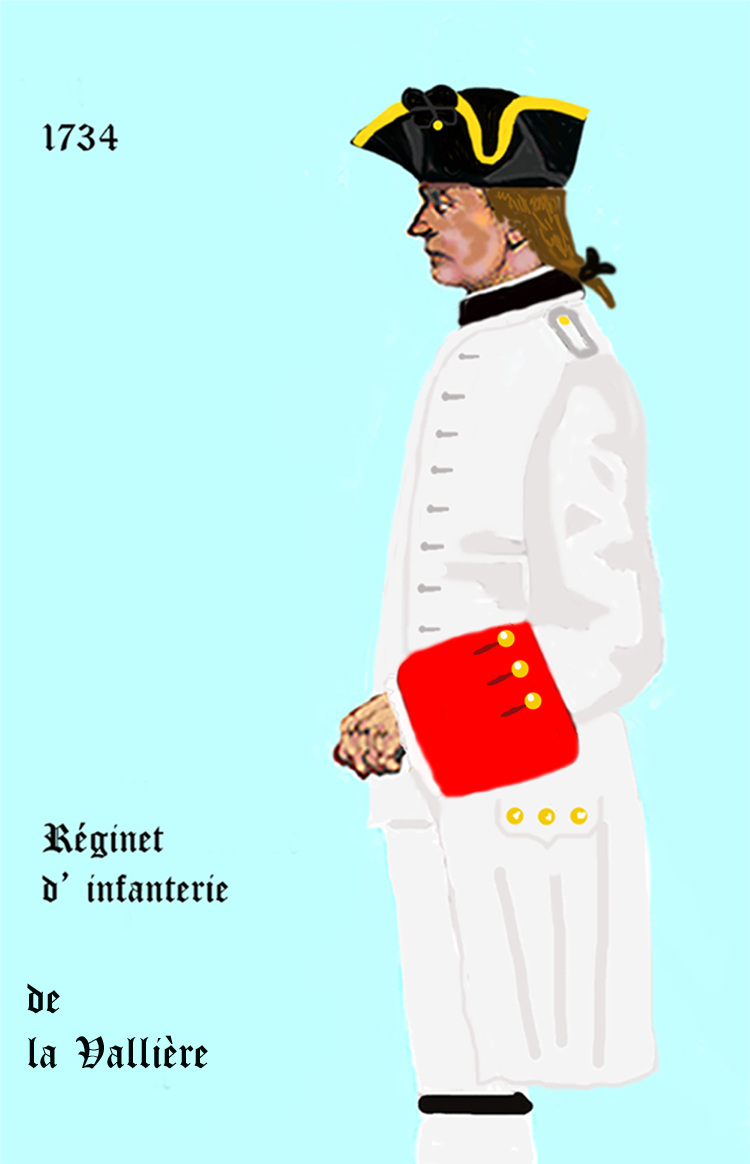
La Valliére

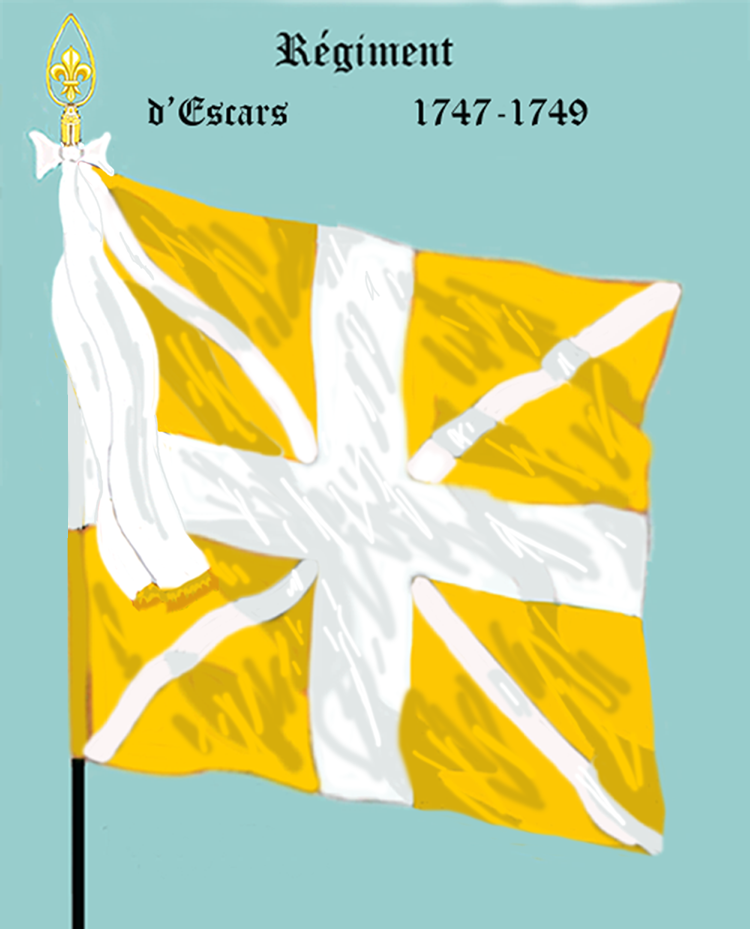
Rég Guise and Rég Escars

Régiment de Boufflers-Wallon
Raised 1744: disbanded 1748)

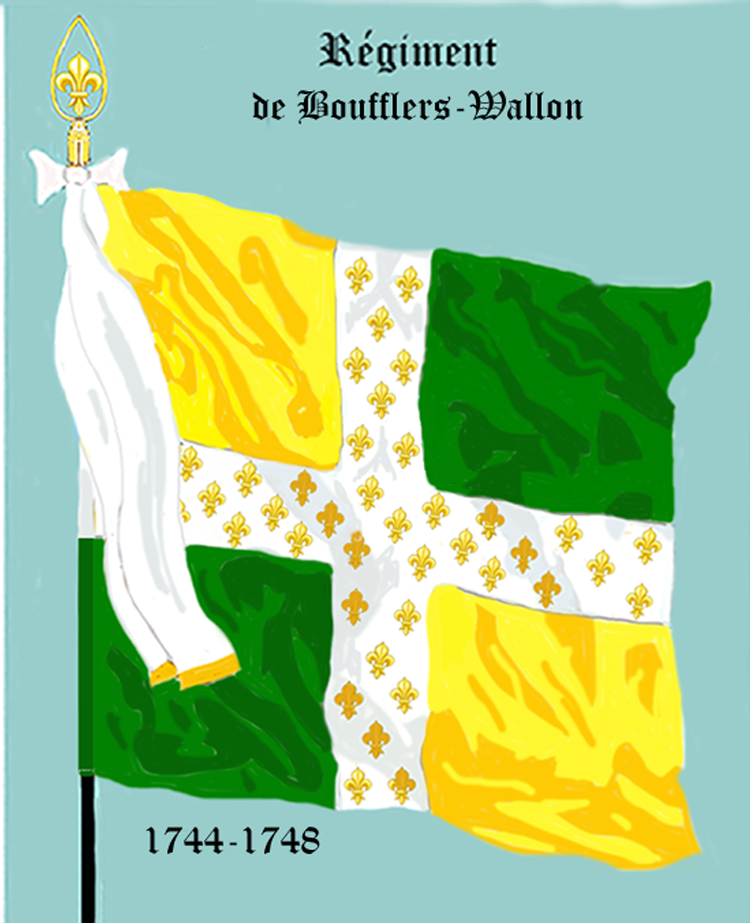
Boufflers-Wallon

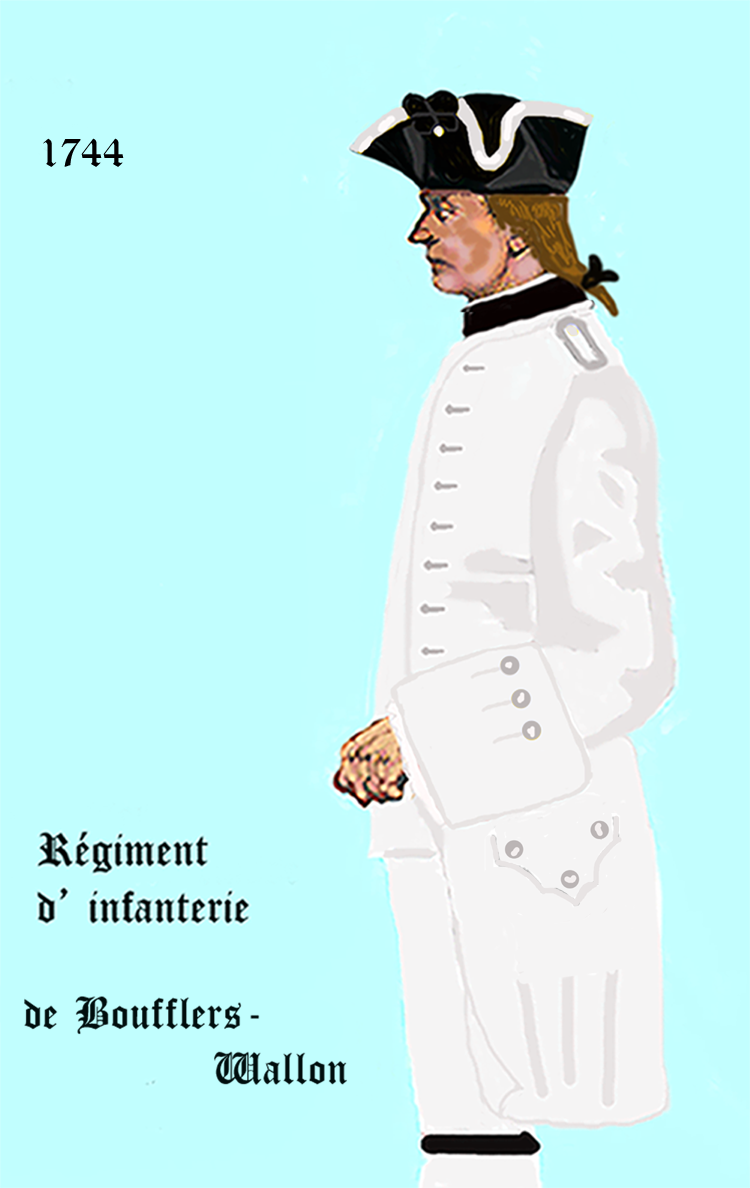
Boufflers-Wallon 1744

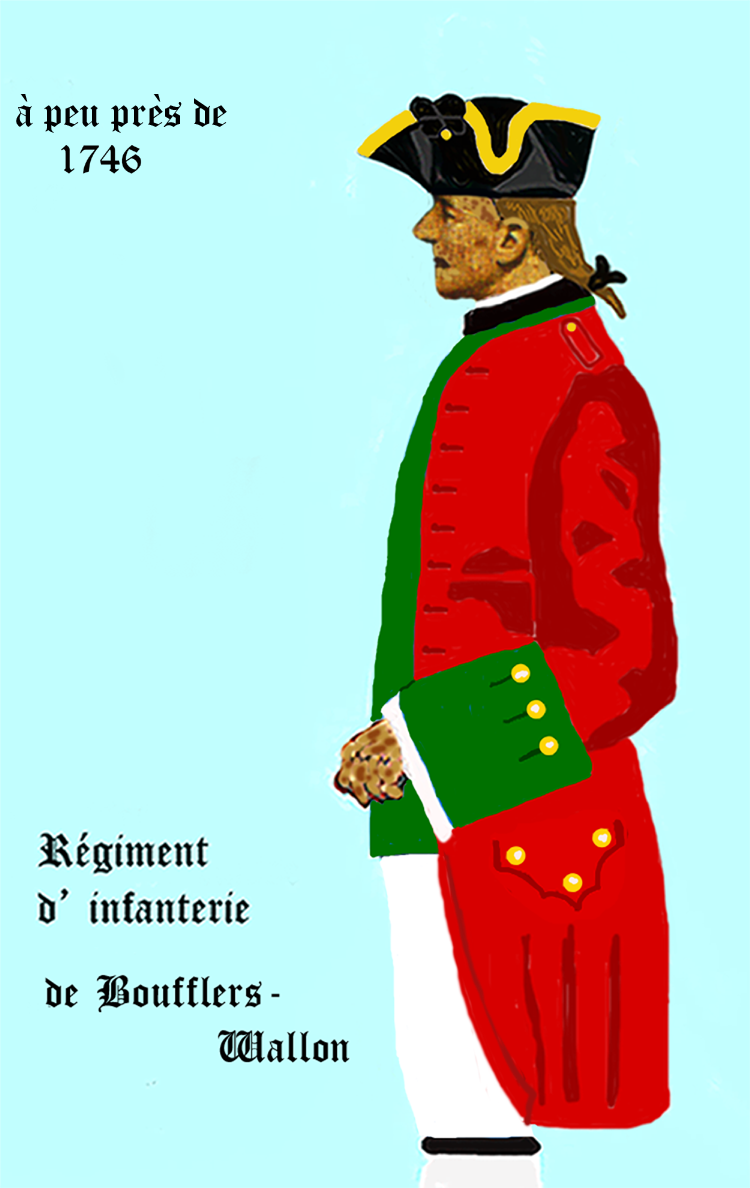
Boufflers Wallon 1746

Régiment d’Hoquerie (liégeois)
Raised 1629
→ 1661 Rég de Grammont (French regiment)

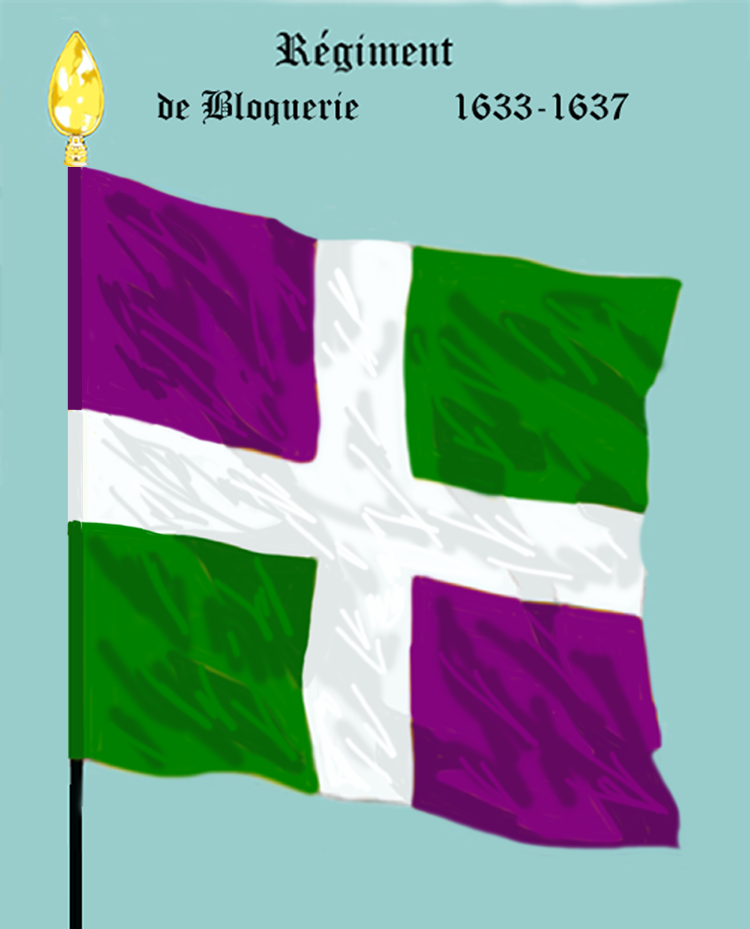
Régiment de Bloquerie (liégeois)

Régiment de Horion
Raised 1757 – Disbanded : 1762

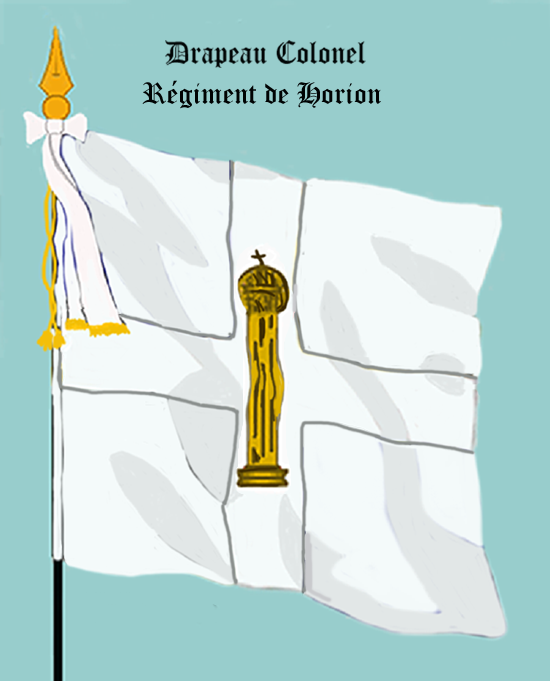
Colonel

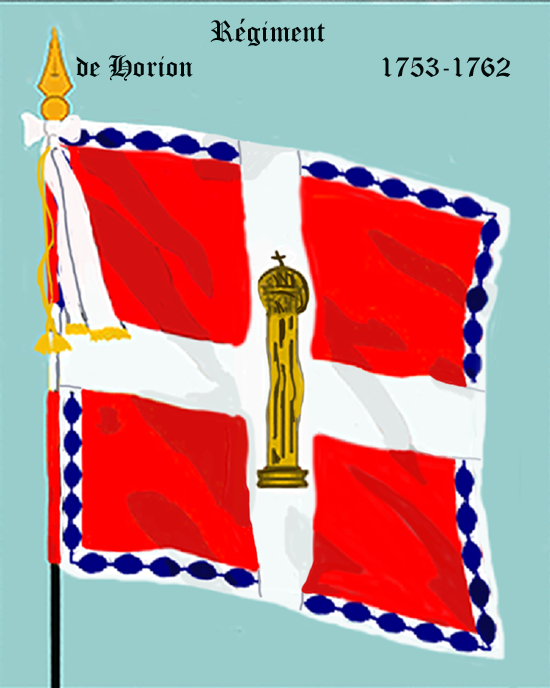
Rég de Horion

Régiment de Miromesnil
Raised: 1664 – Disbanded : 1714

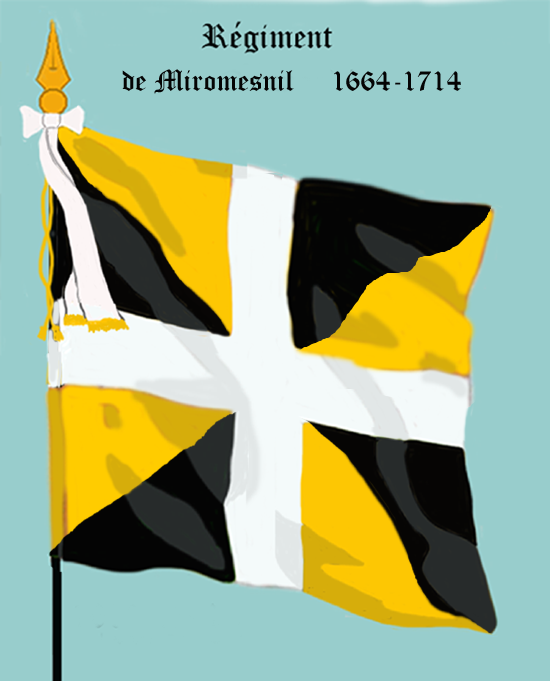
Rég de Miromesnil

Régiment de Royal Liégeois
Raised: 1787
→ 1791 101ème régiment d’infanterie de ligne

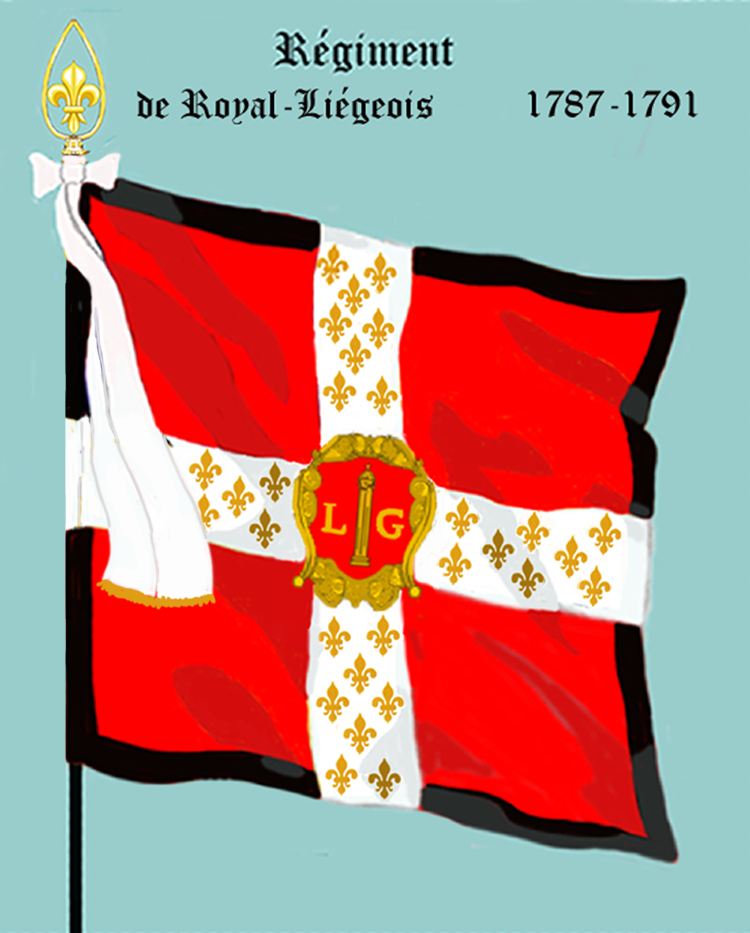
Rgt Royal Liégois

Régiment de Vierzet (liégeois)
Raised: 1757 – Disbanded : 1762

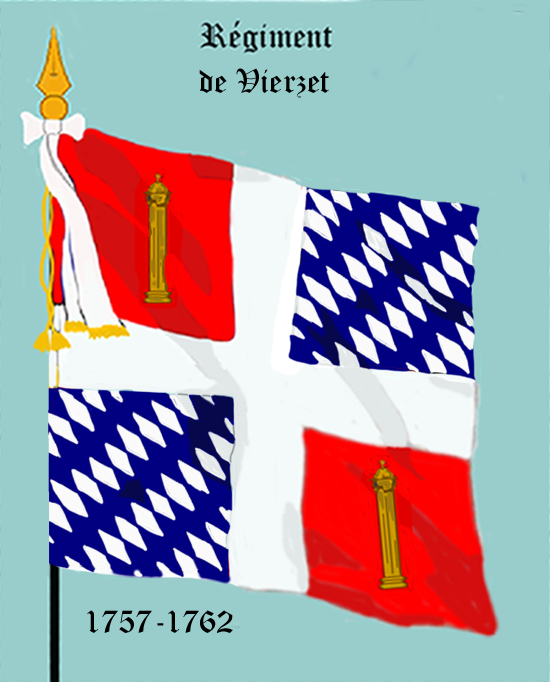
Rgt de Vierzet

Régiment de Royal-Wallon
Raised 1734 - Disbanded 1748

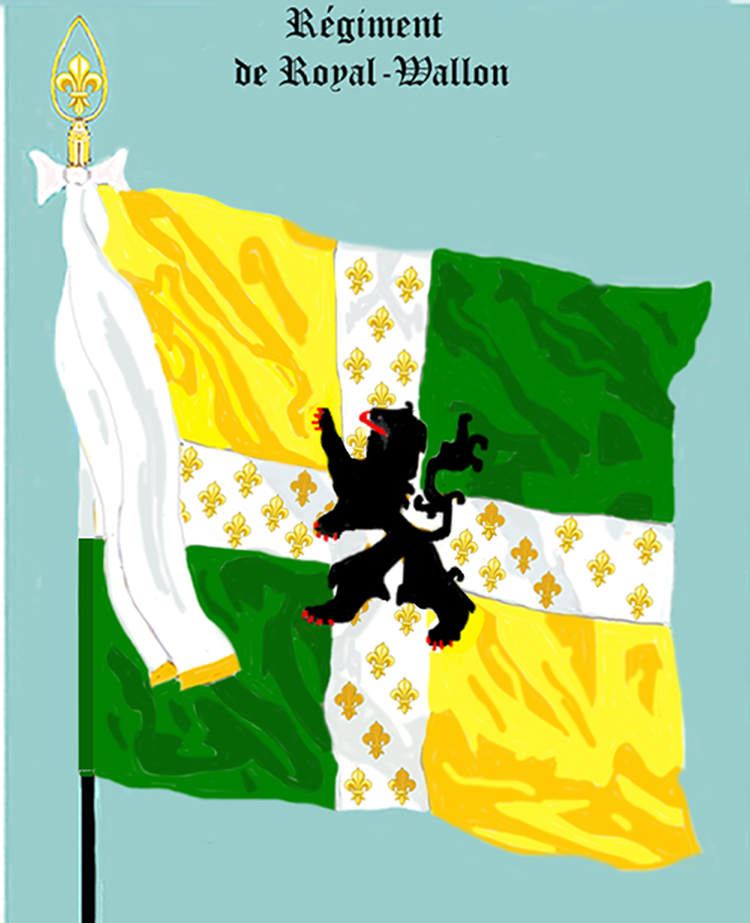
Royal Wallon

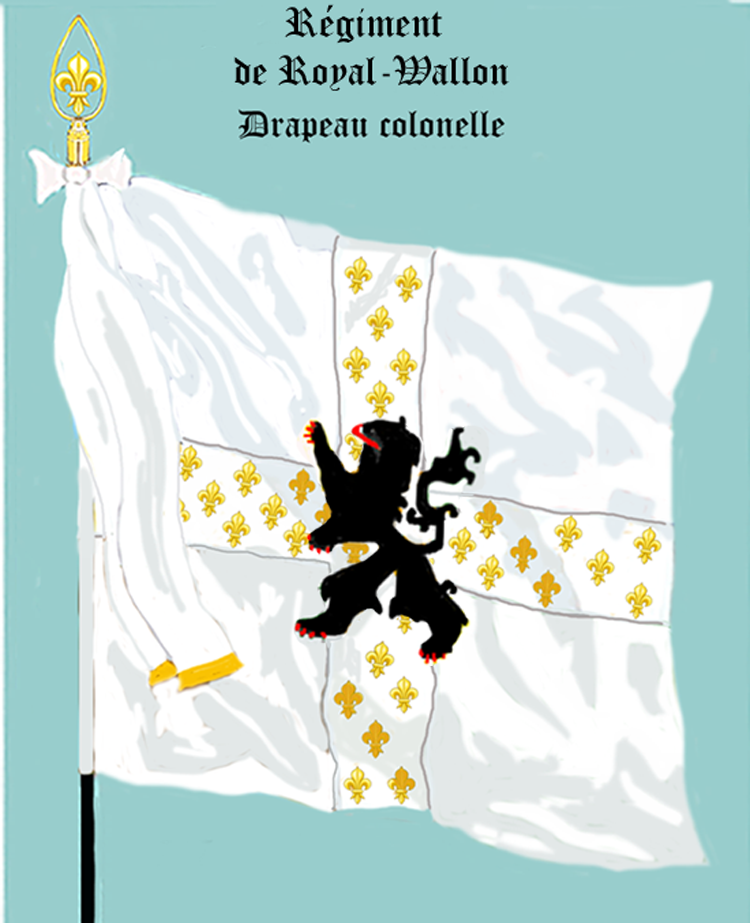
Colonel

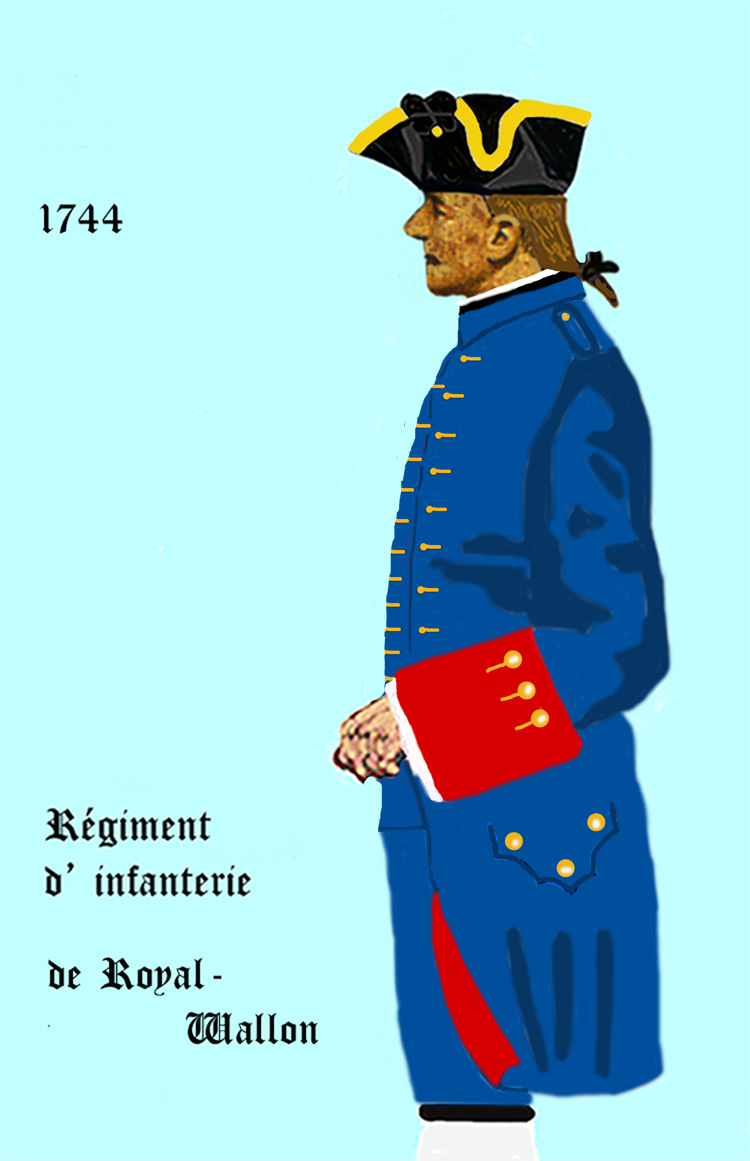
Royal Wallon 1744 - 1748

== German regiments ==
Régiment d’Alsace
Raised 1656
→ 1791: 53ème régiment d’infanterie de ligne

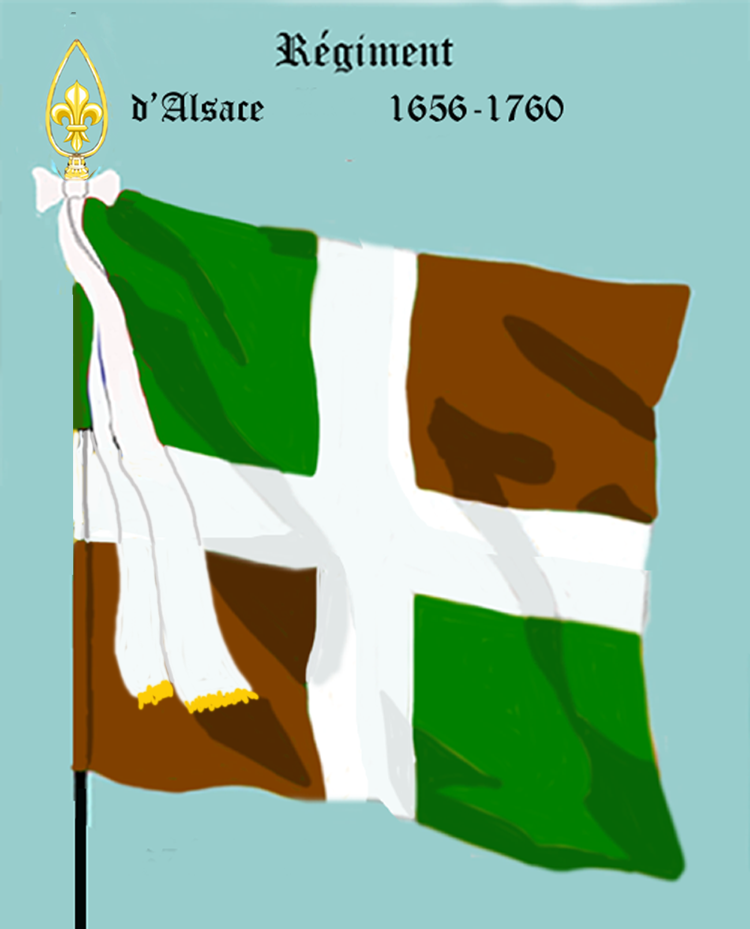
Alsace 1656–1760

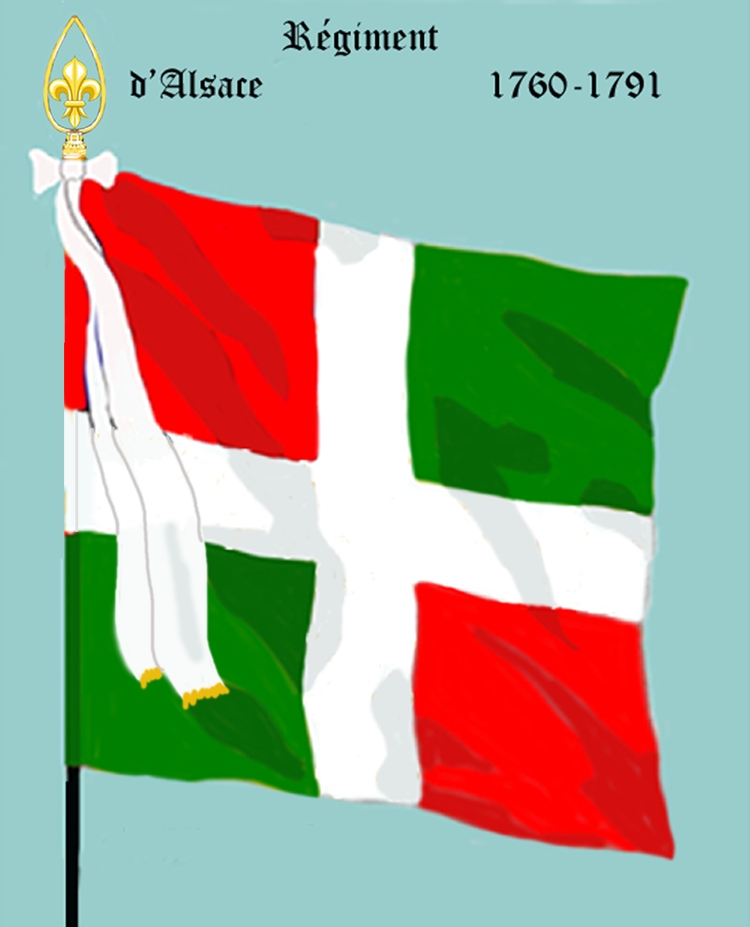
Alsace 1760–1791

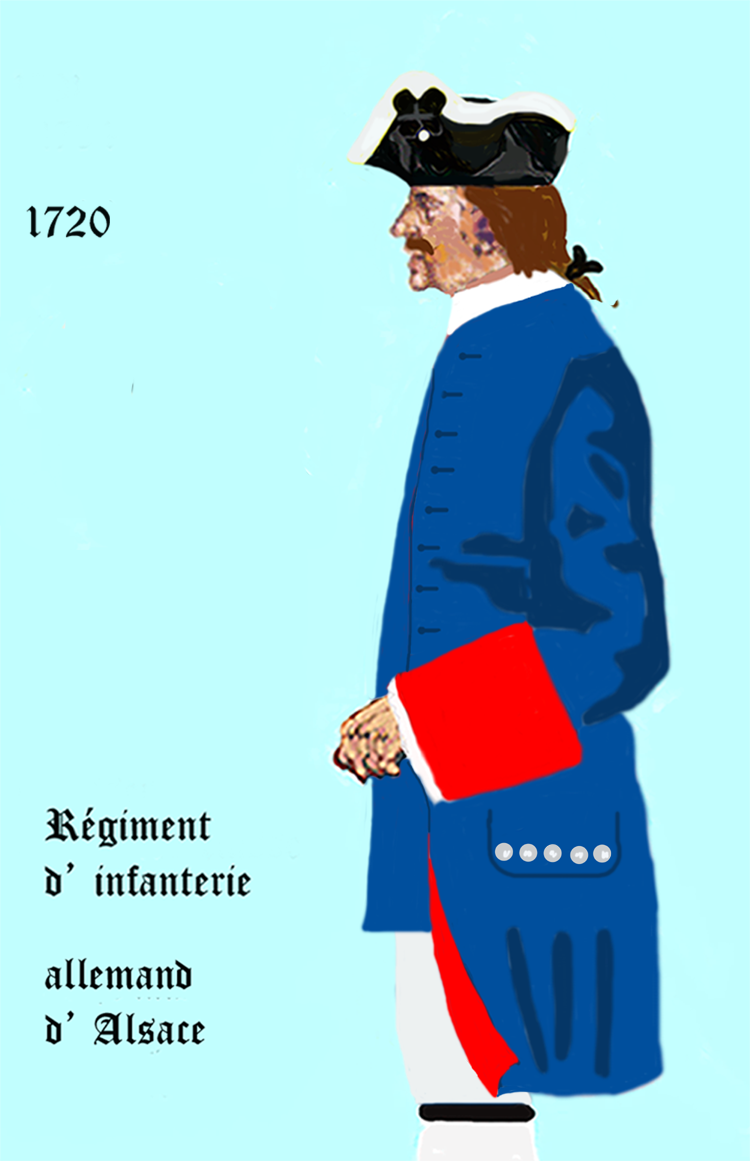
Alsace 1720

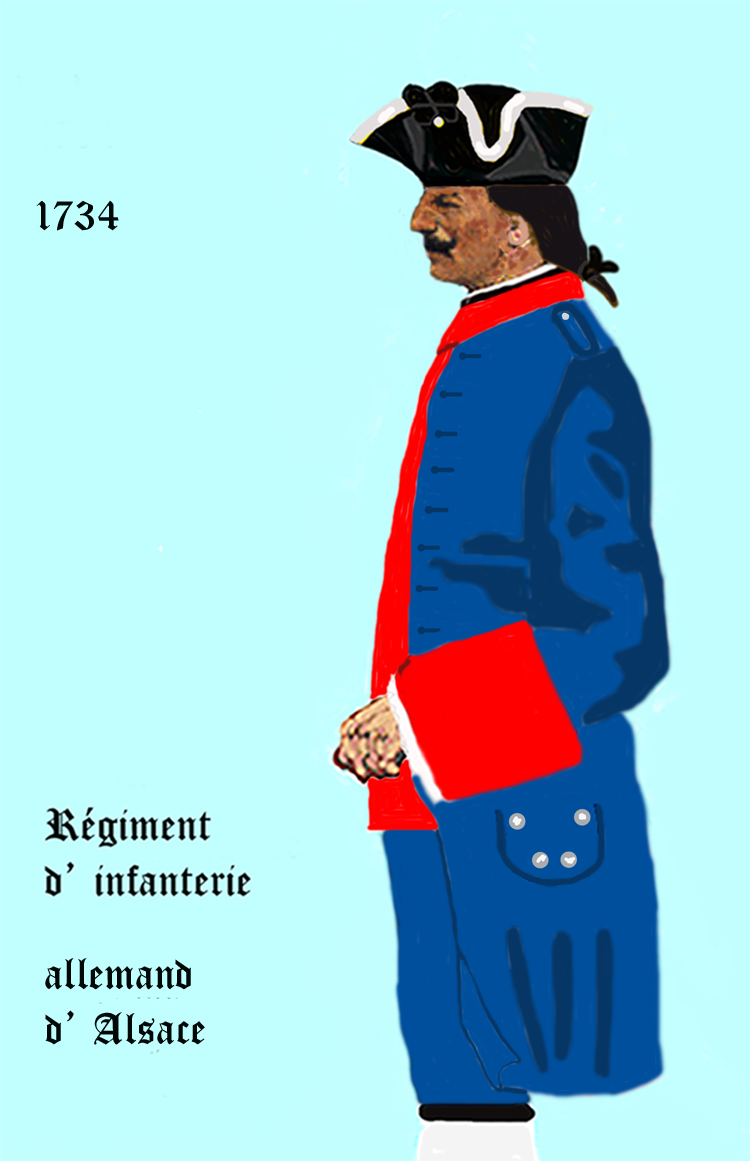
Alsace 1734

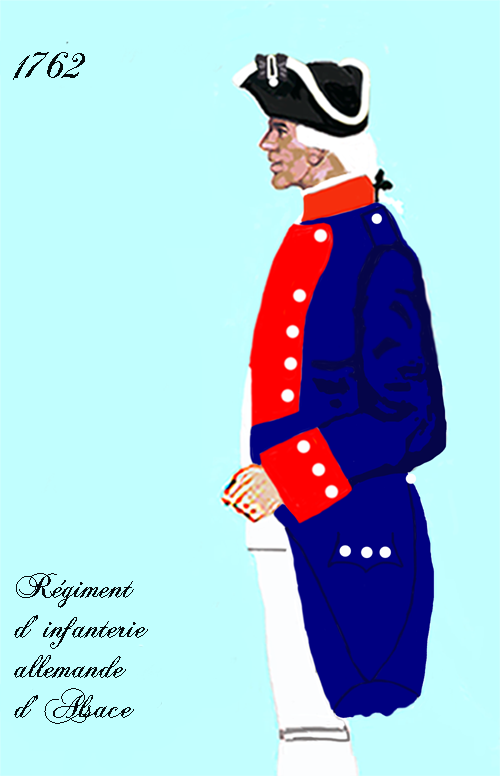
Alsace 1762–1767

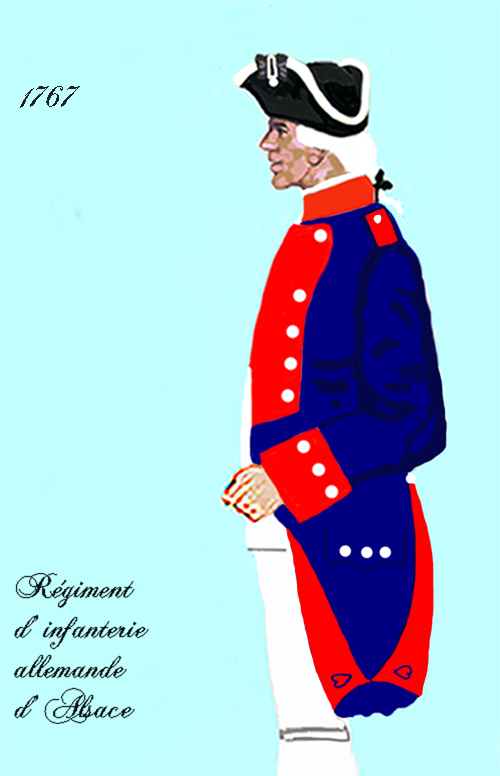
Alsace 1767–1776

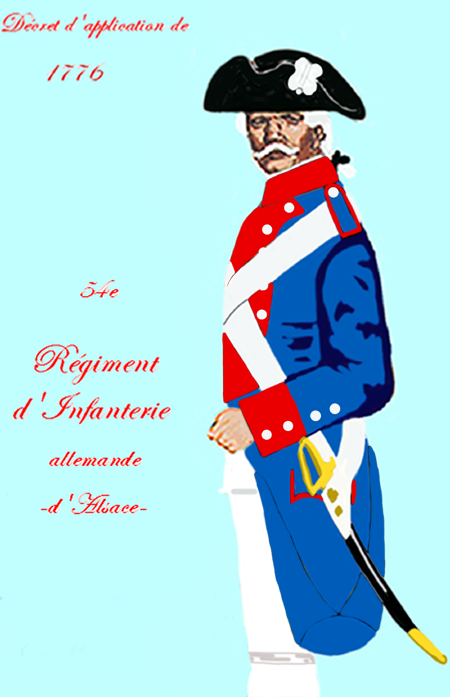
Alsace 1776

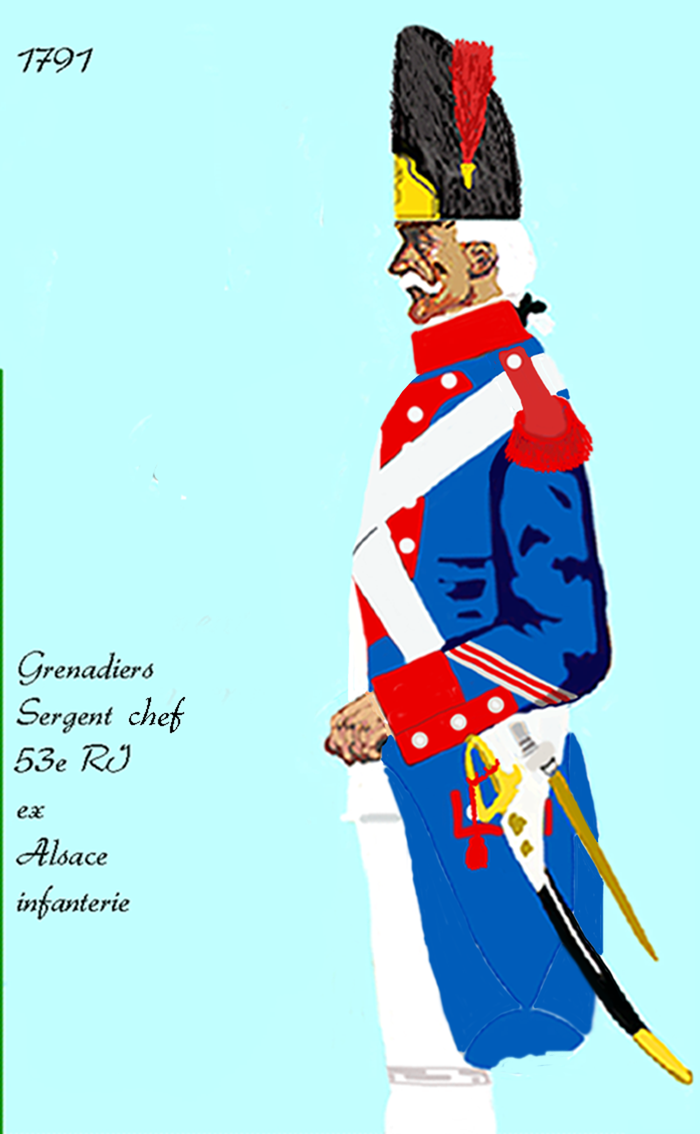
Alsace 1791

Régiment de Lowendahl
Raised 1743
→ 1760: Merged with Régiment d’Anhalt

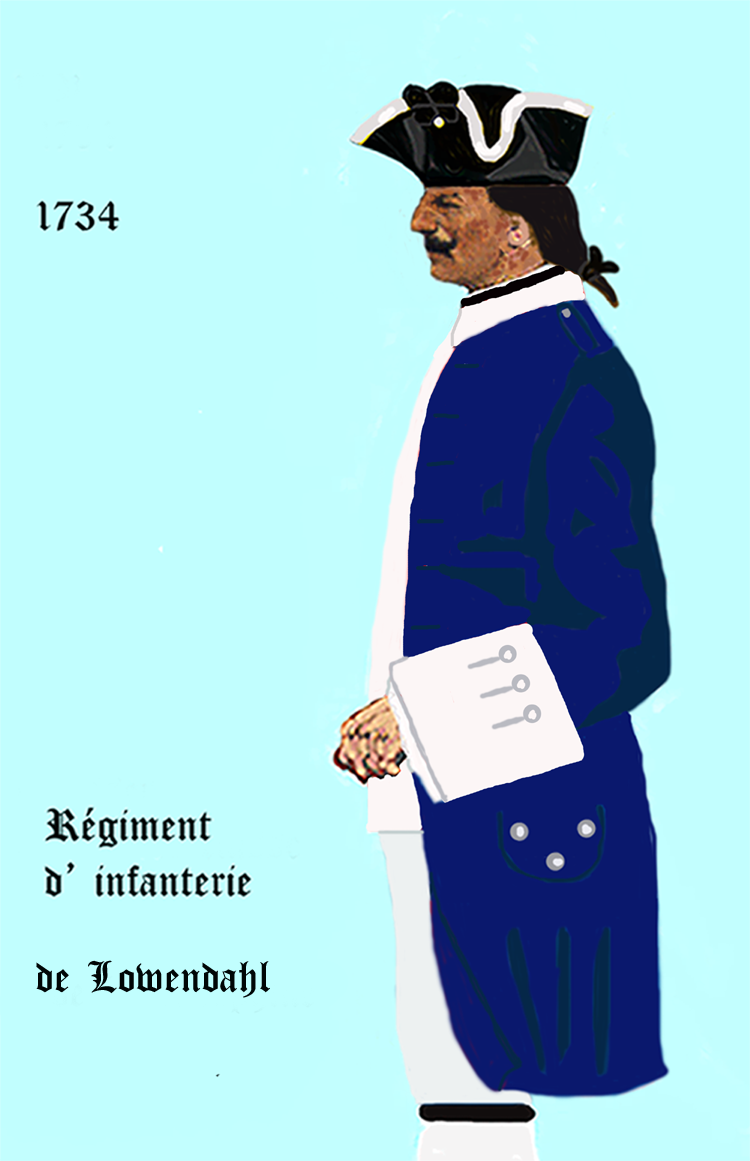
Rgt de Lowendahl

Régiment de Fürstenberg
Raised 1668
→ 1686: Régiment de Greder
→ 1716: Régiment de Sparre
→ 1720: Régiment de Saxe
→ 1751: Régiment de Bentheim
→ 1759: Régiment d’Anhalt
→ 1783: Régiment de Salm-Salm
→ 1791: 62ème régiment d’infanterie de ligne

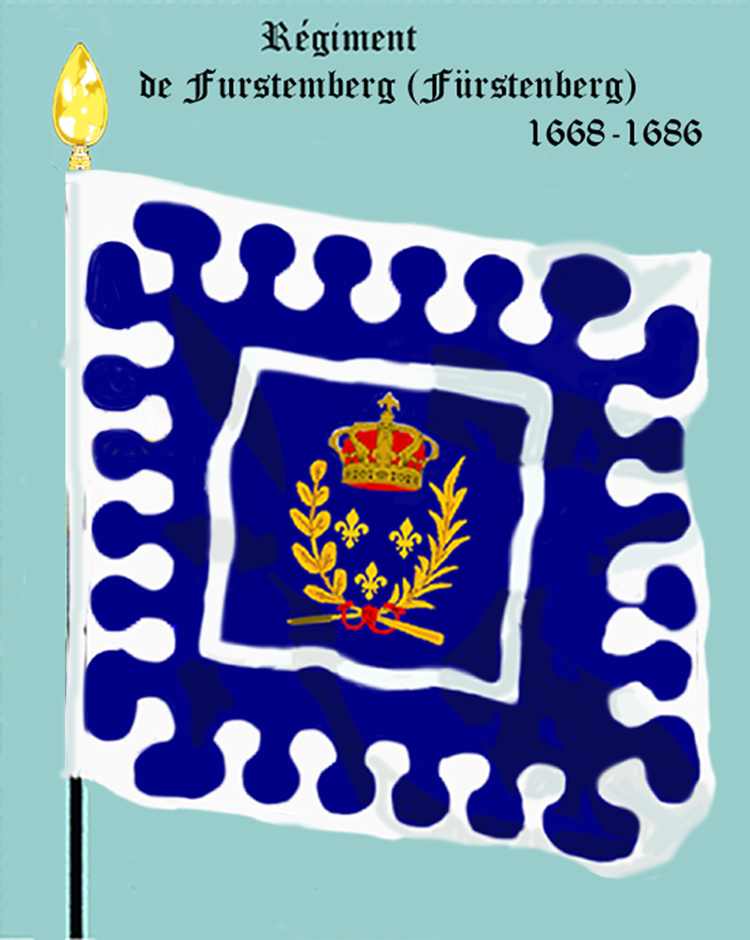
Fürstenberg

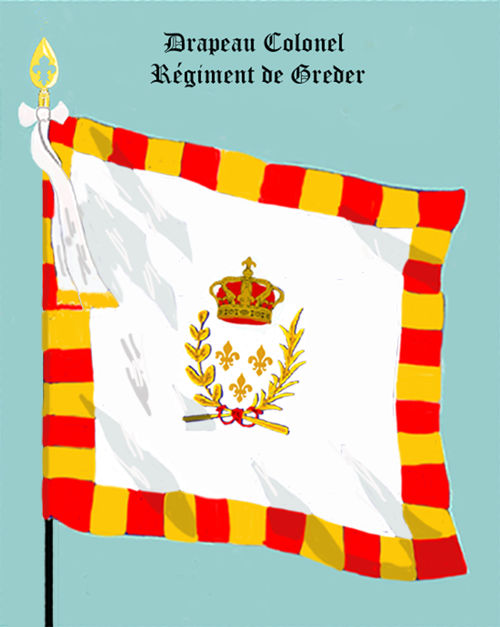
Colonel

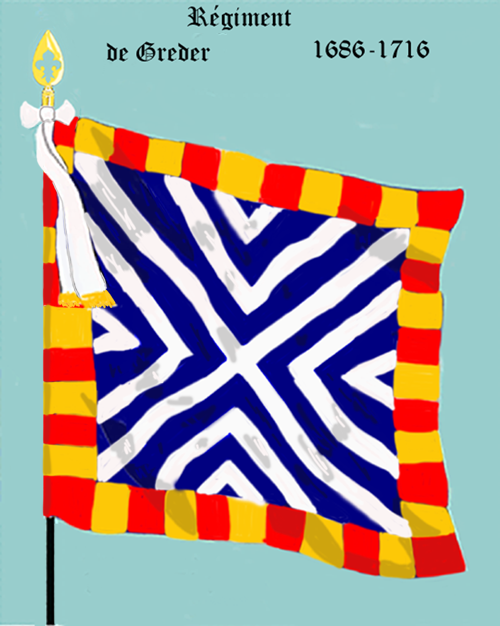
Greder 1er modéle

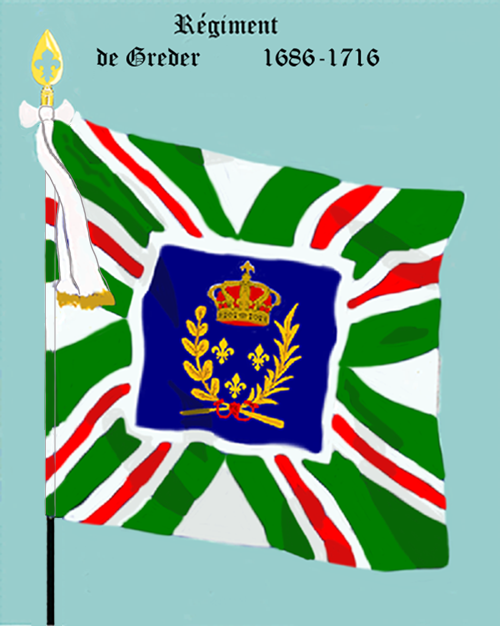
Greder 2e modéle

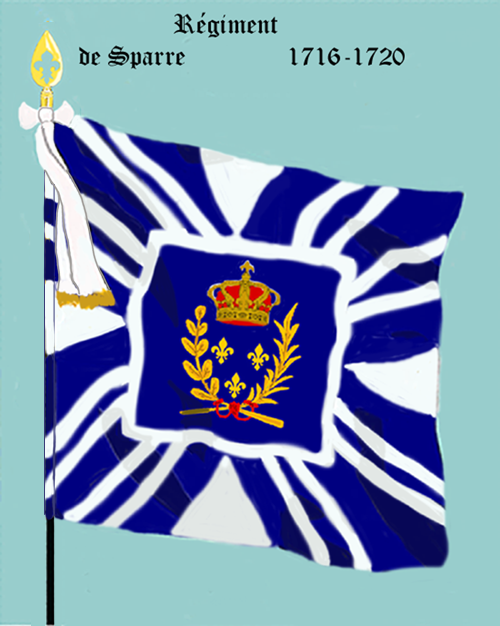
Rég Sparre, Bentheim and Salm-Salm

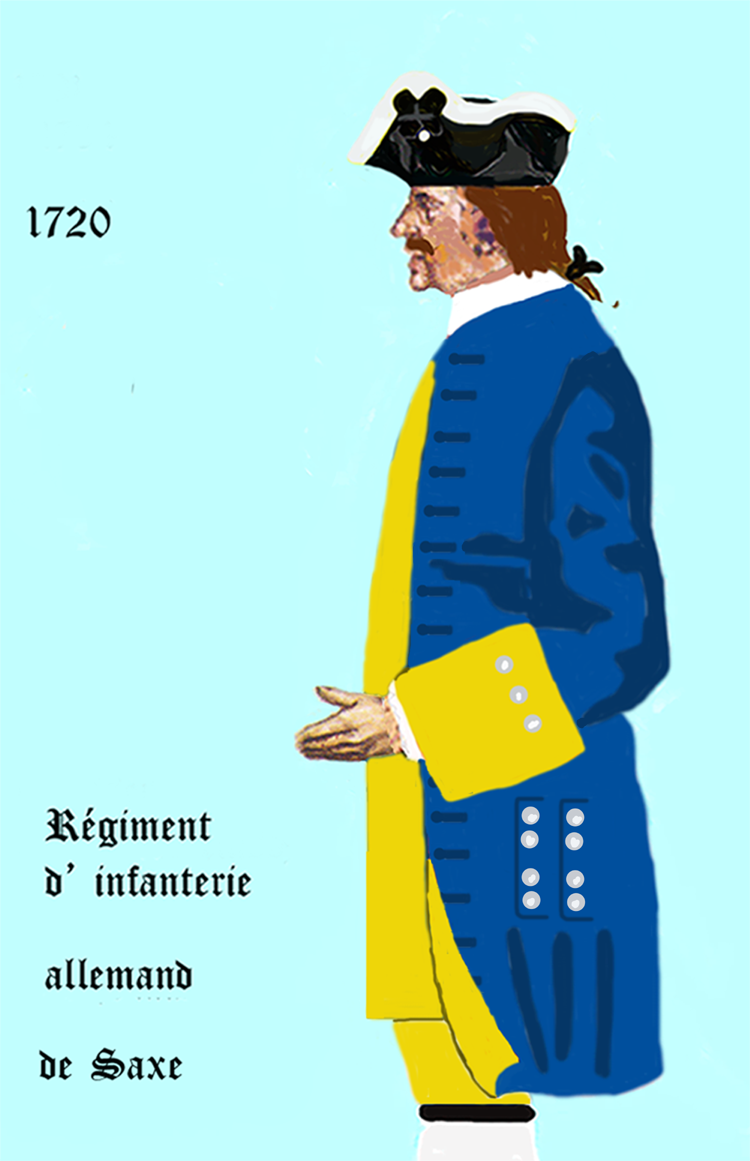
Saxe 1720

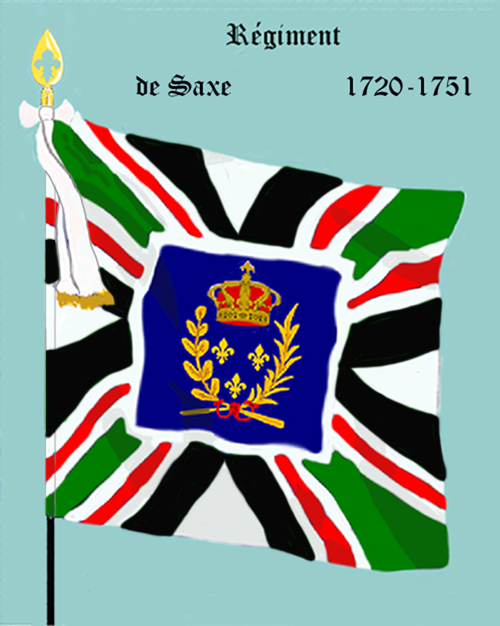
Saxe

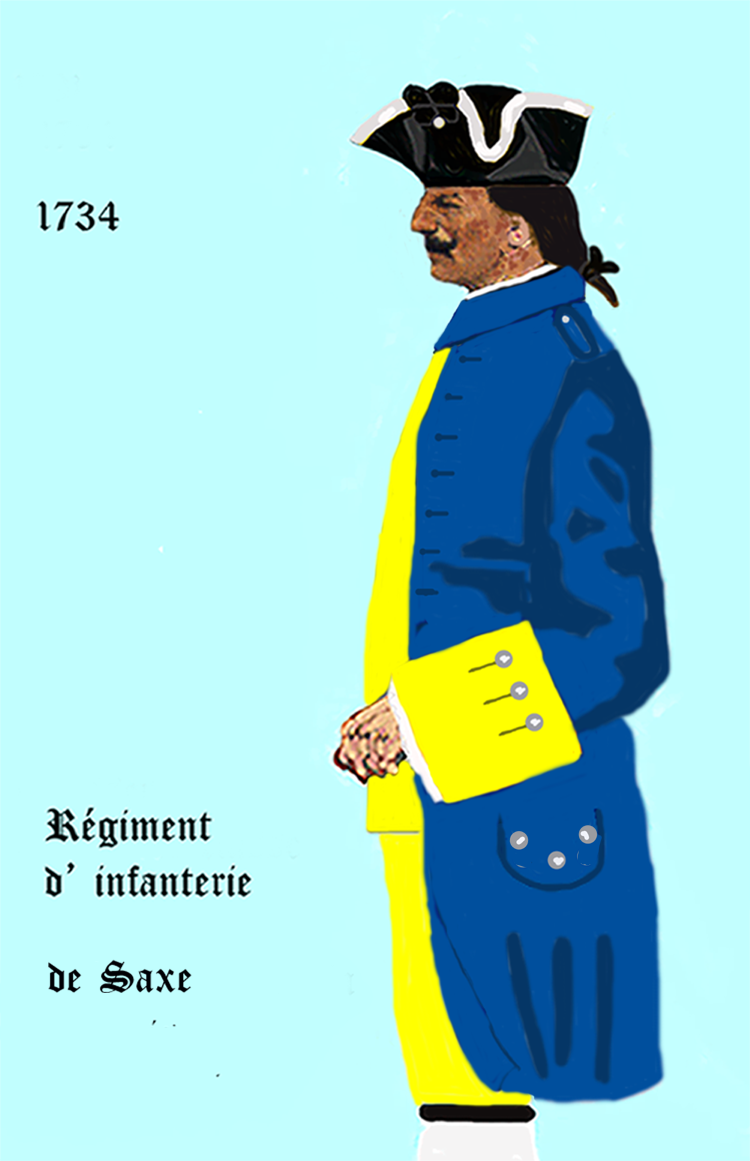
Saxe 1734

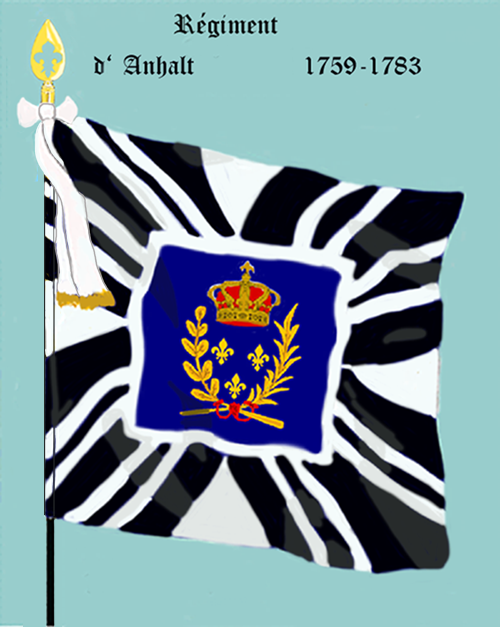
Anhalt

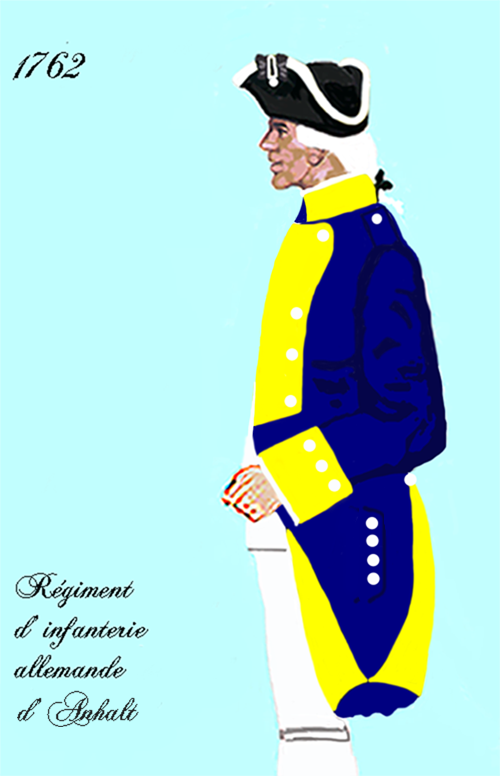
Anhalt 1762

Régiment de Bergh
Raised 1744
→ 1760: Merged with Régiment d’Alsace

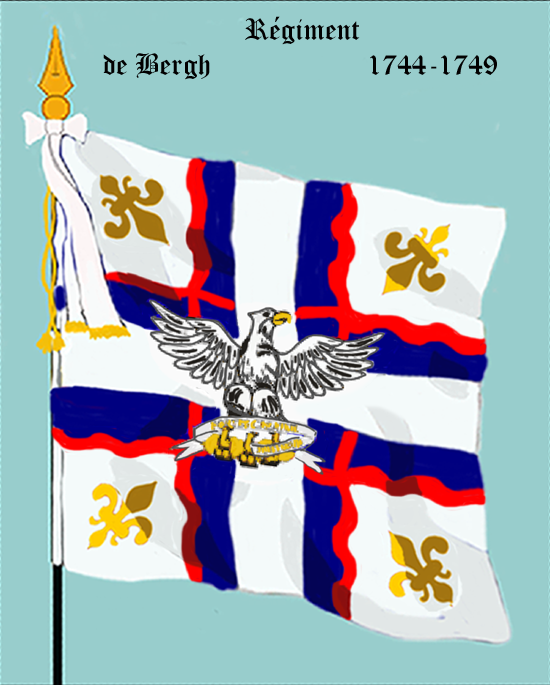
Bergh

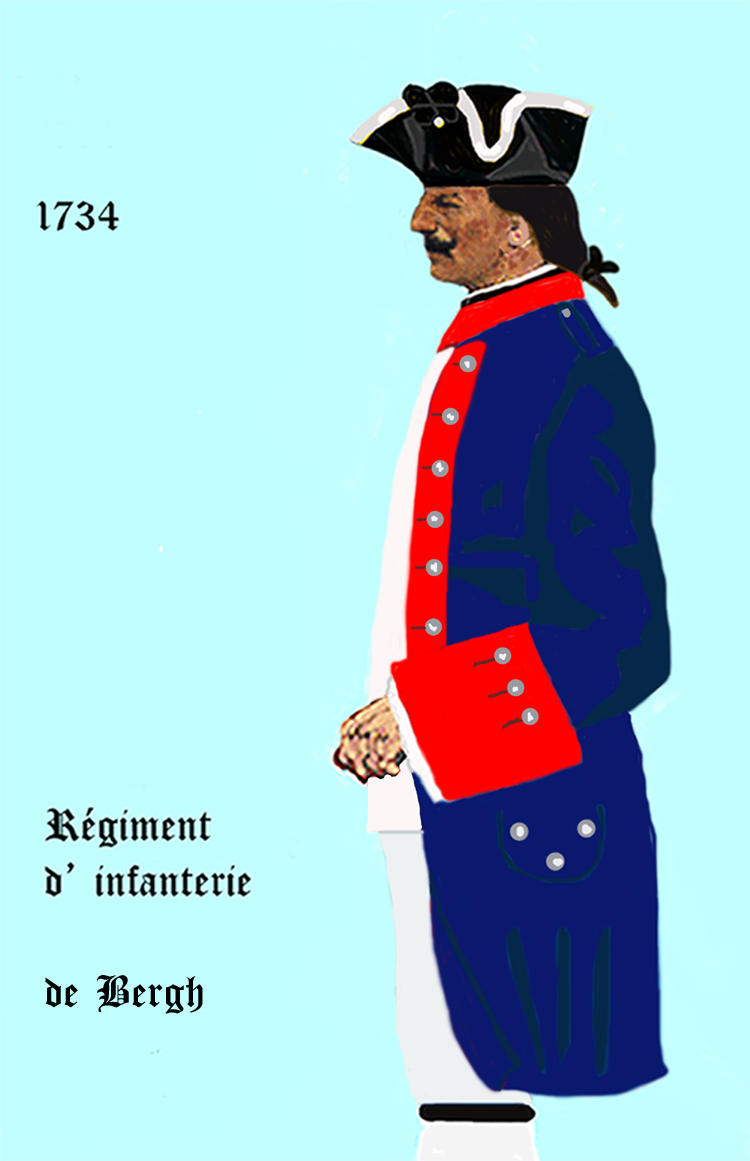
Bergh

Régiment de Bouillon
Raised 1757
→ 1791: 98ème régiment d’infanterie de ligne

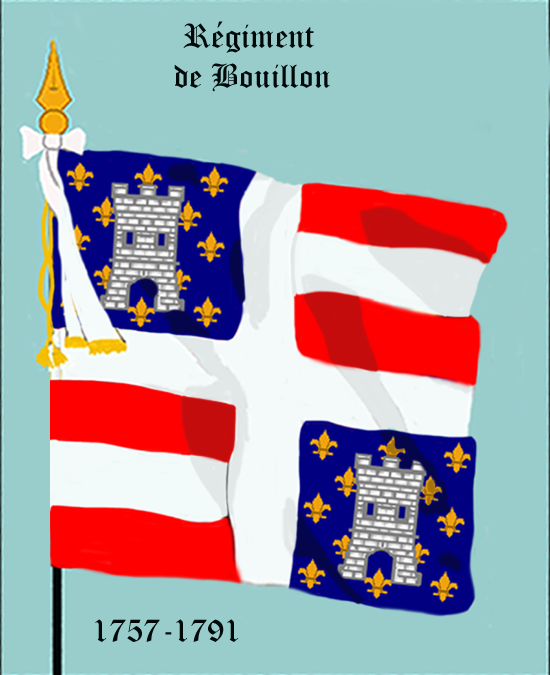
Bouillon

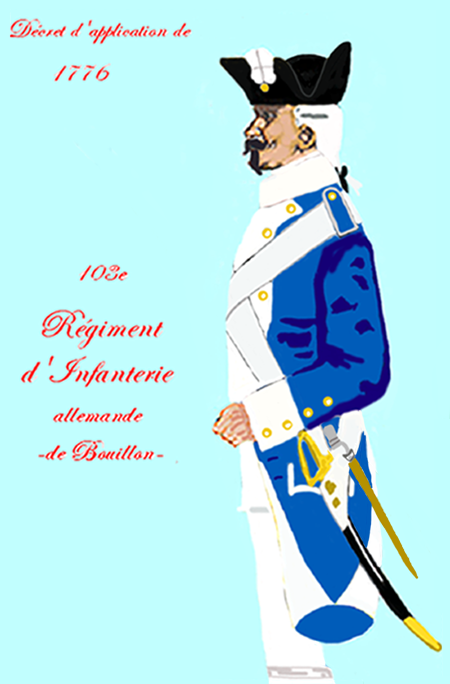
Bouillon

Régiment de Fersen
Raised 1745
→ 1754: Régiment de Nassau-Usingen
→ 1758: Merged with Régiment de Nassau

Régiment de Saint Germain Raised 1747
→ 1760: Merged with Régiment de Nassau

Régiment de Nassau-Saarbrück
Raised 1745
→ 1758: Régiment de Nassau
→ 1791: 96ème régiment d’infanterie de ligne

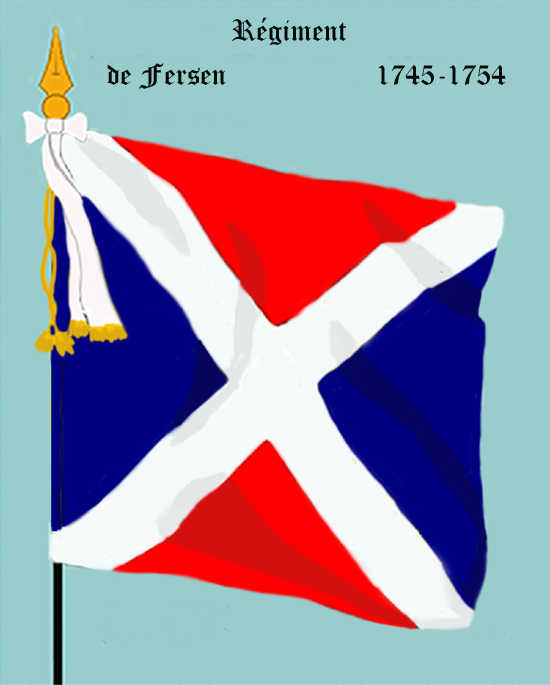
Rég Fersen and Rég Nassau-Usingen

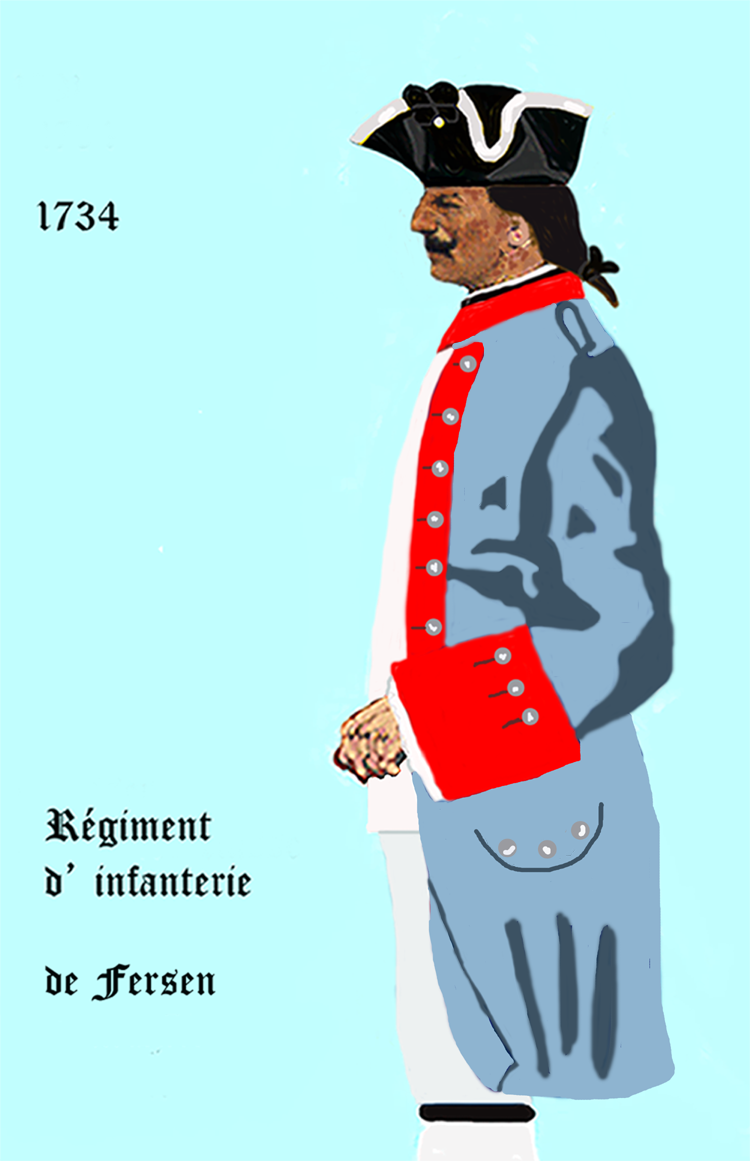
Fersen 1744

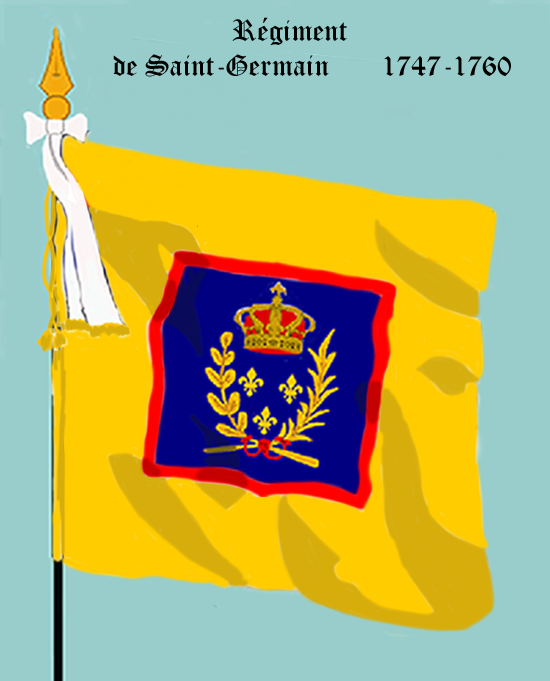
Saint Germain

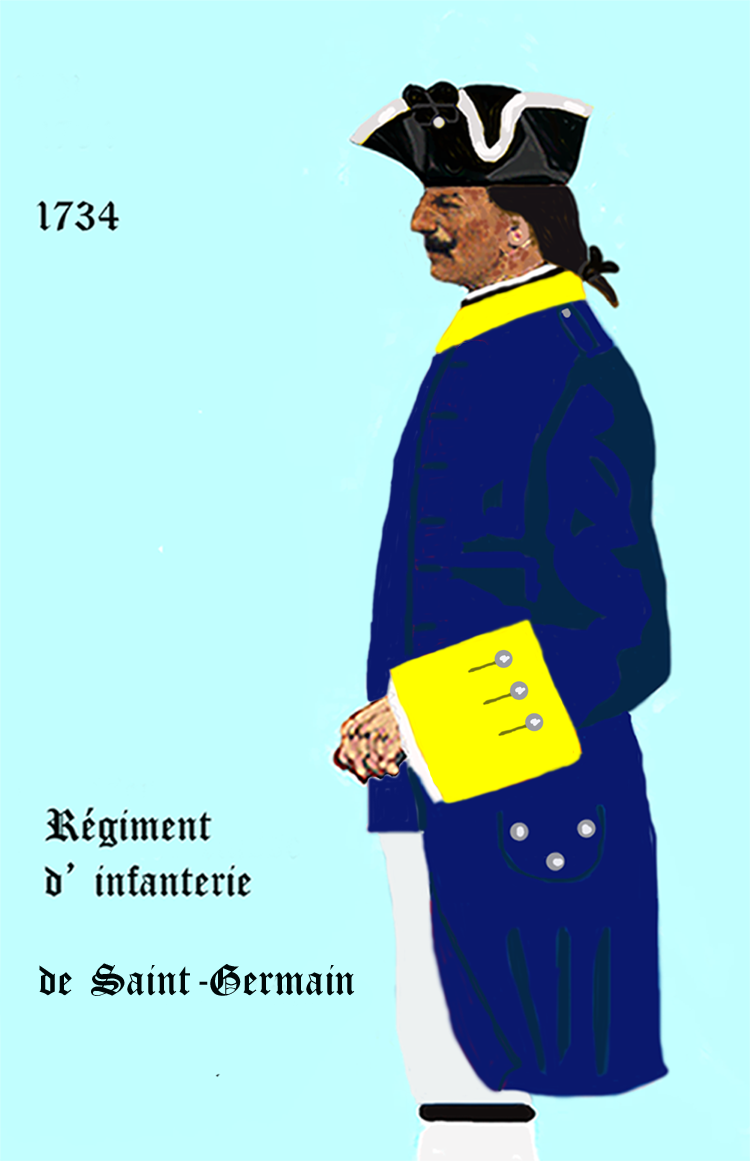
Saint Germain 1734

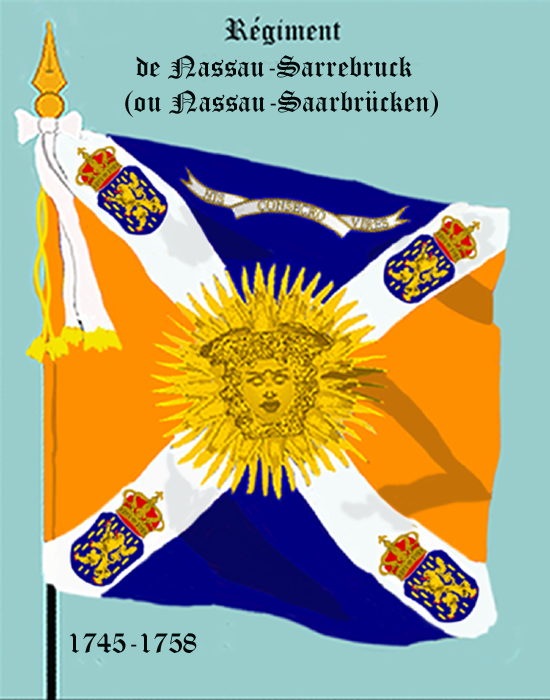
Rég de Nassau-Sarrebruck (German: Nassau-Saarbrücken) and Rég Nassau

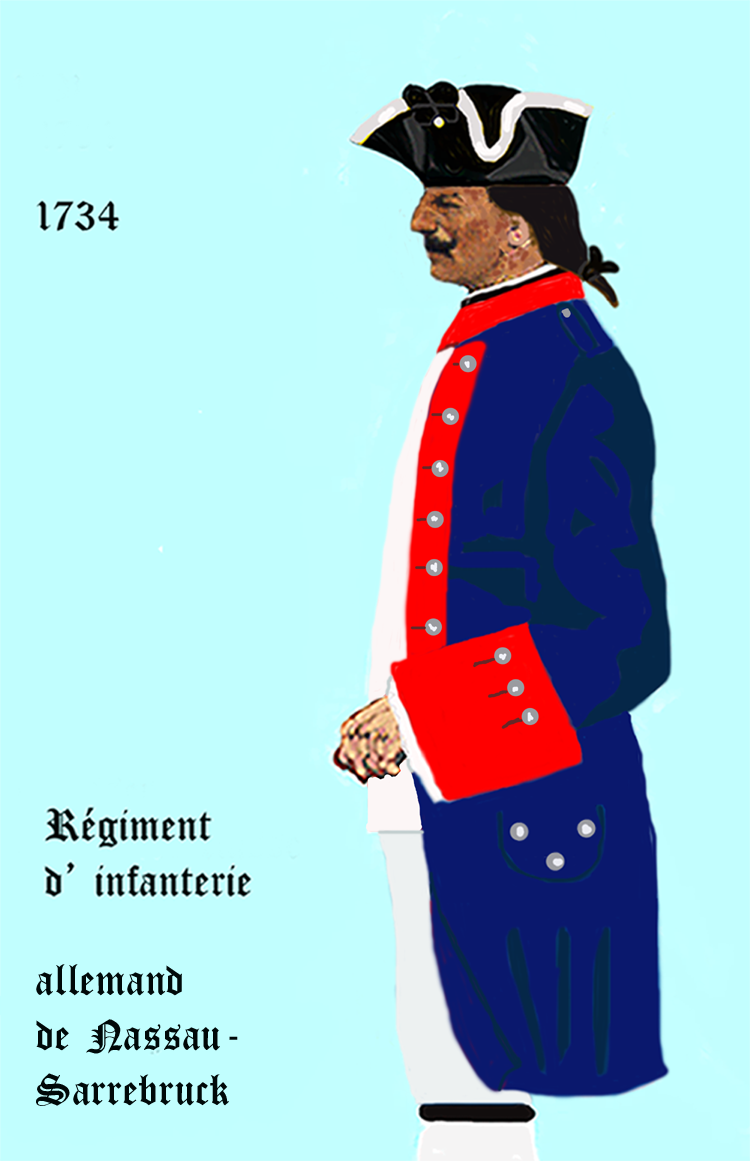
Nassau-Saarbrücken 1734

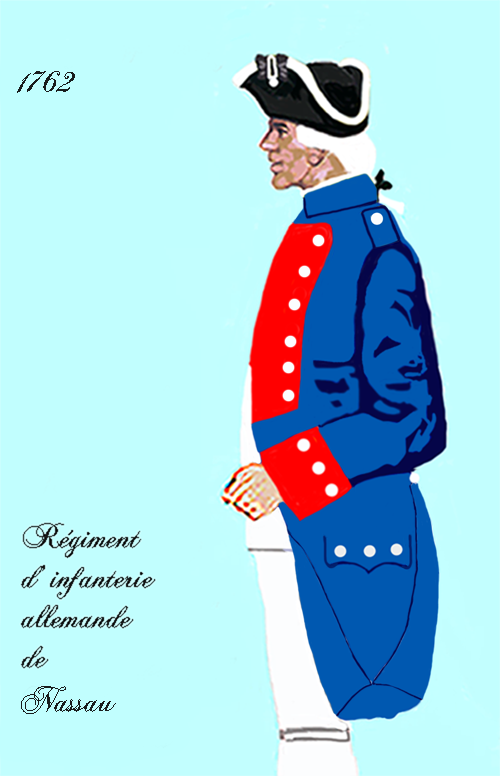
Nassau 1762–1767

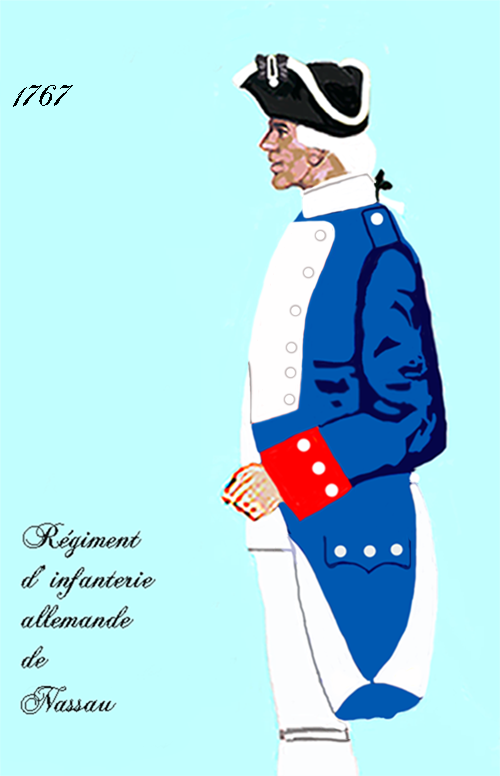
Nassau 1767–1776

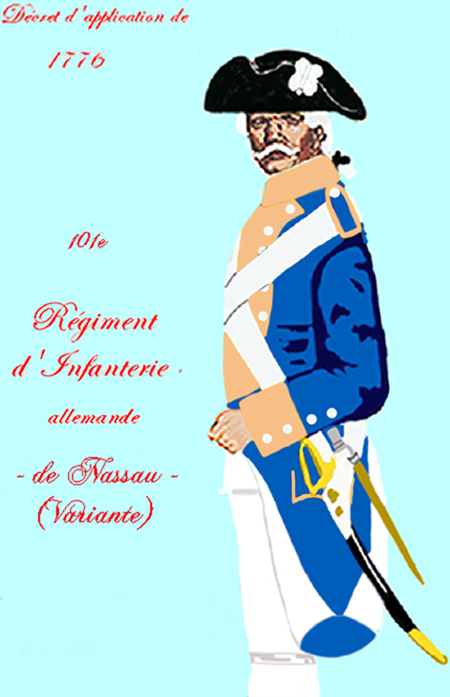
Nassau 1776

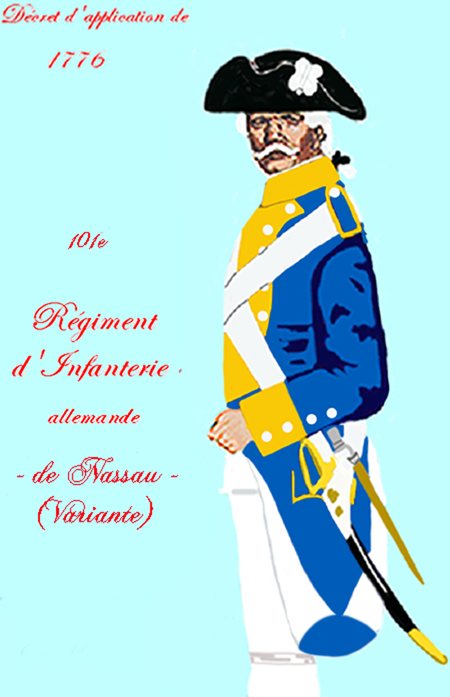
Nassau 1776

Régiment de Leisler
Raised 1690
→ 1694: Régiment de Sparre
→ 1714: Régiment de Lenck
→ 1734: Régiment d’Appelgrehn
→ 1742: Régiment Royal Suèdois
→ 1791: 89ème régiment d’infanterie de ligne

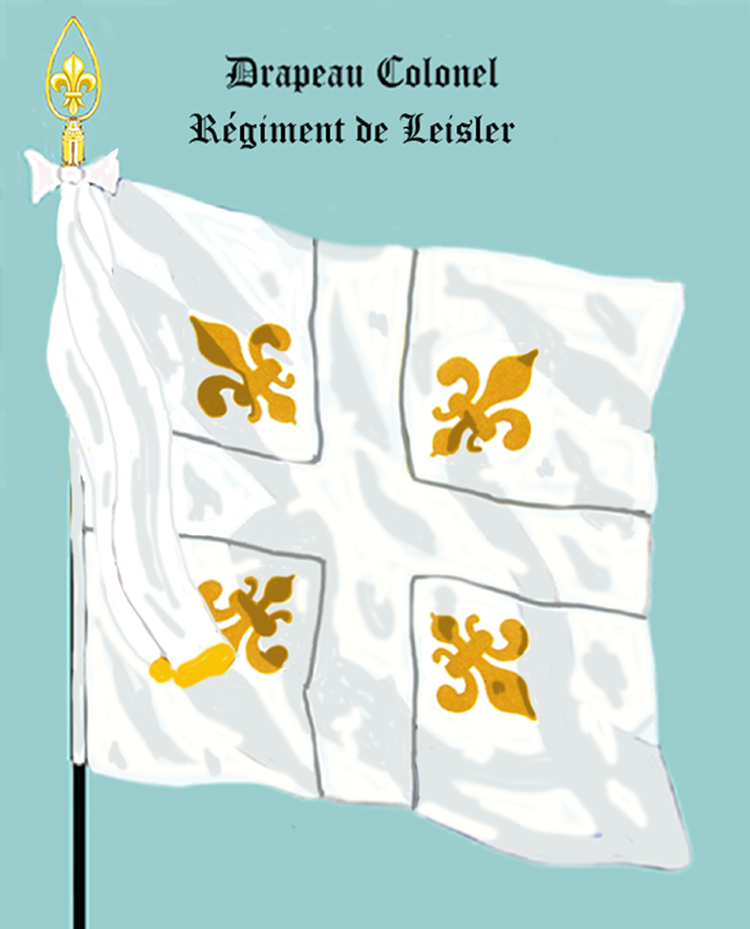
Colonel 1760

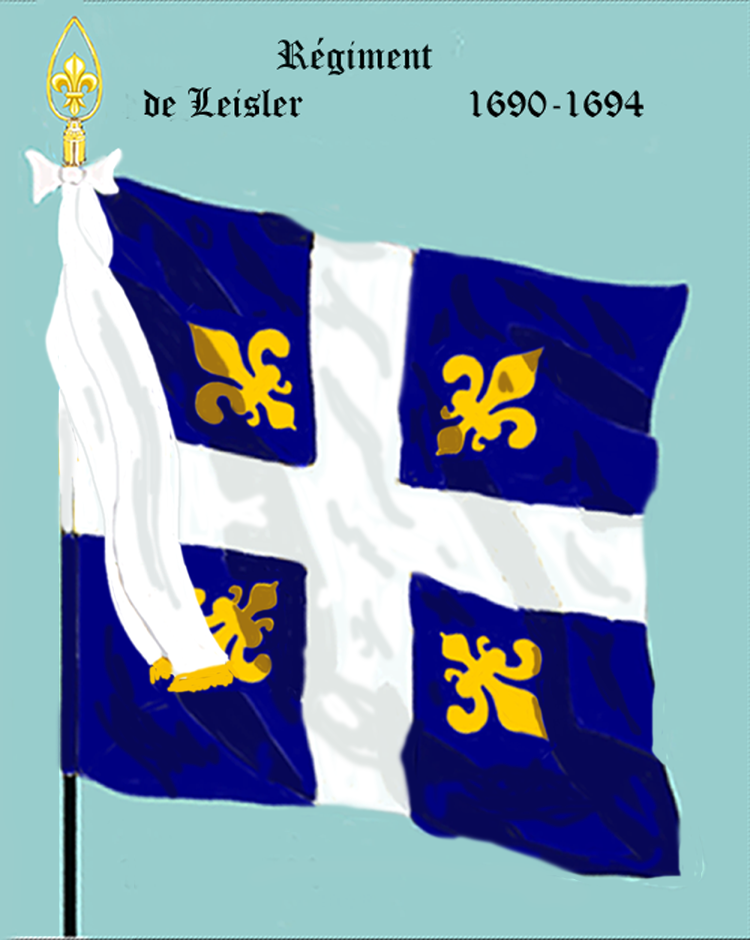
Rég Leisler,Sparre, Lenck and Appelgrehn

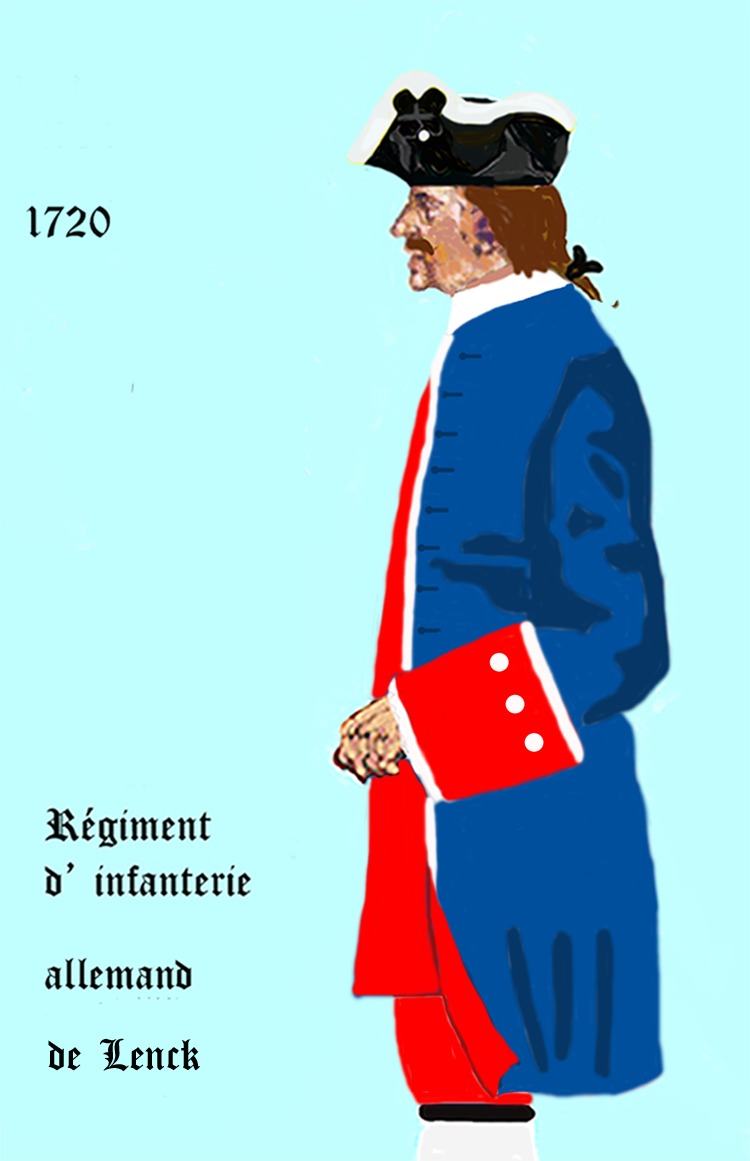
Rég Lenck 1720

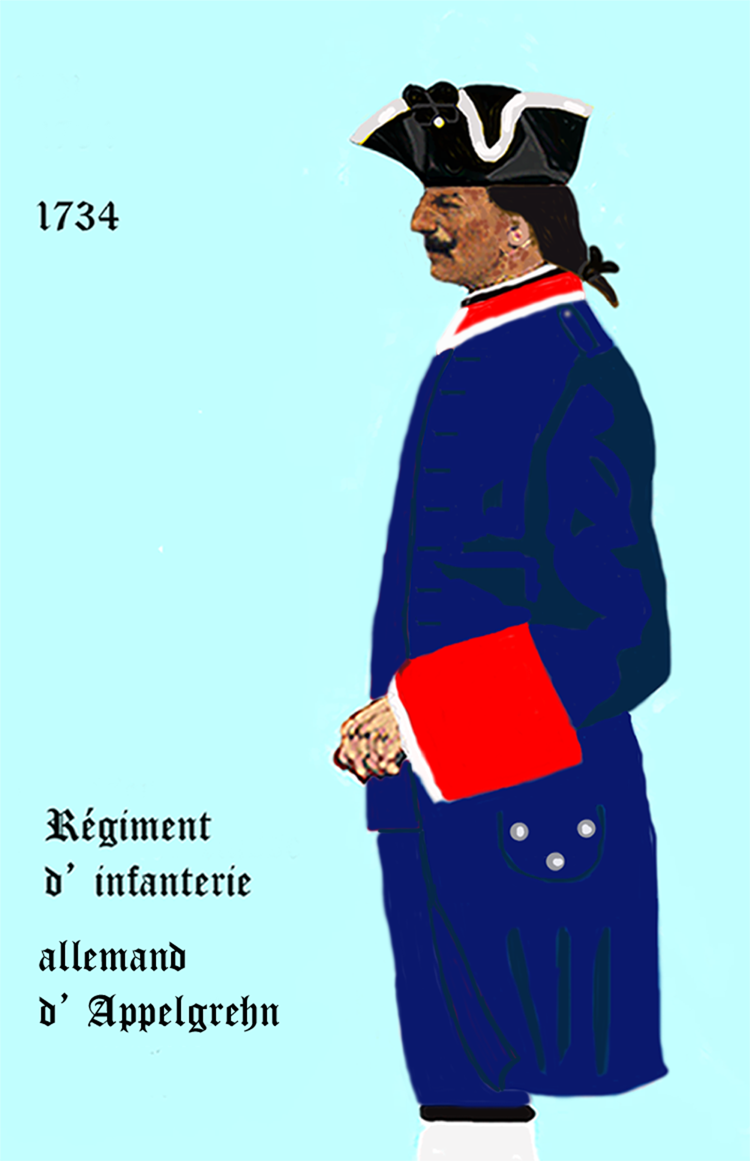
Appelgrehn

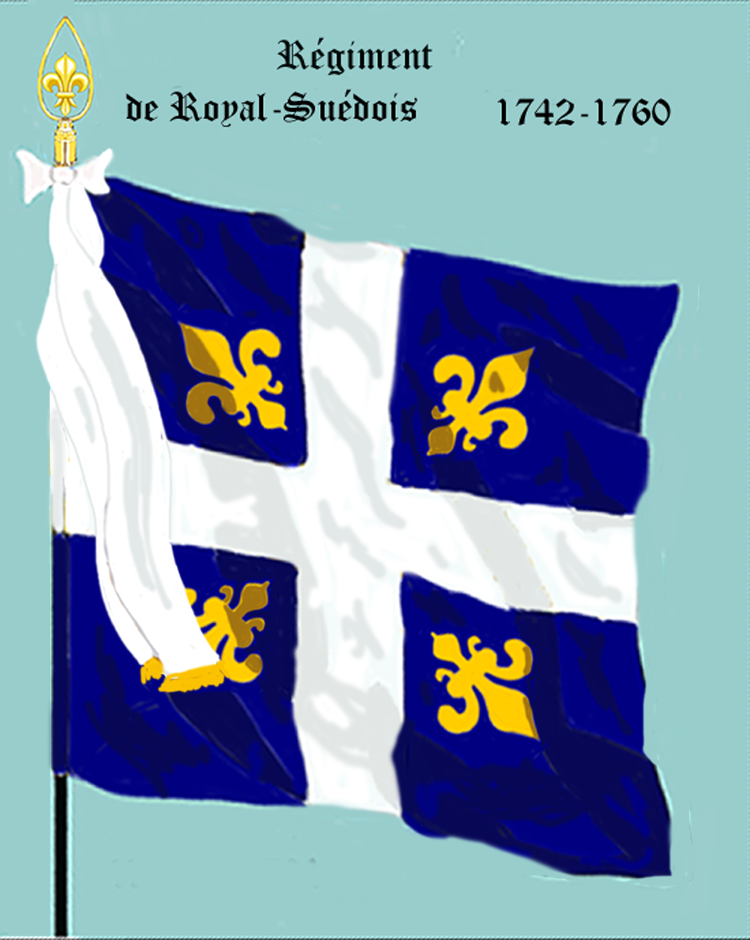
Royal-Suédois 1742–1760

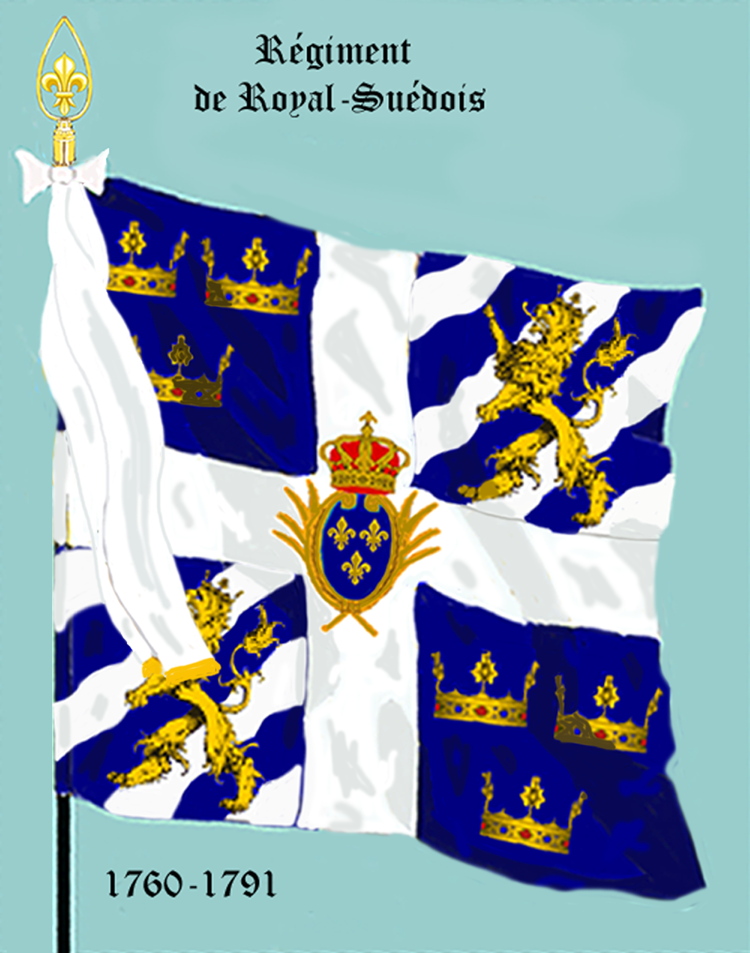
Royal Suédois 1760–1791

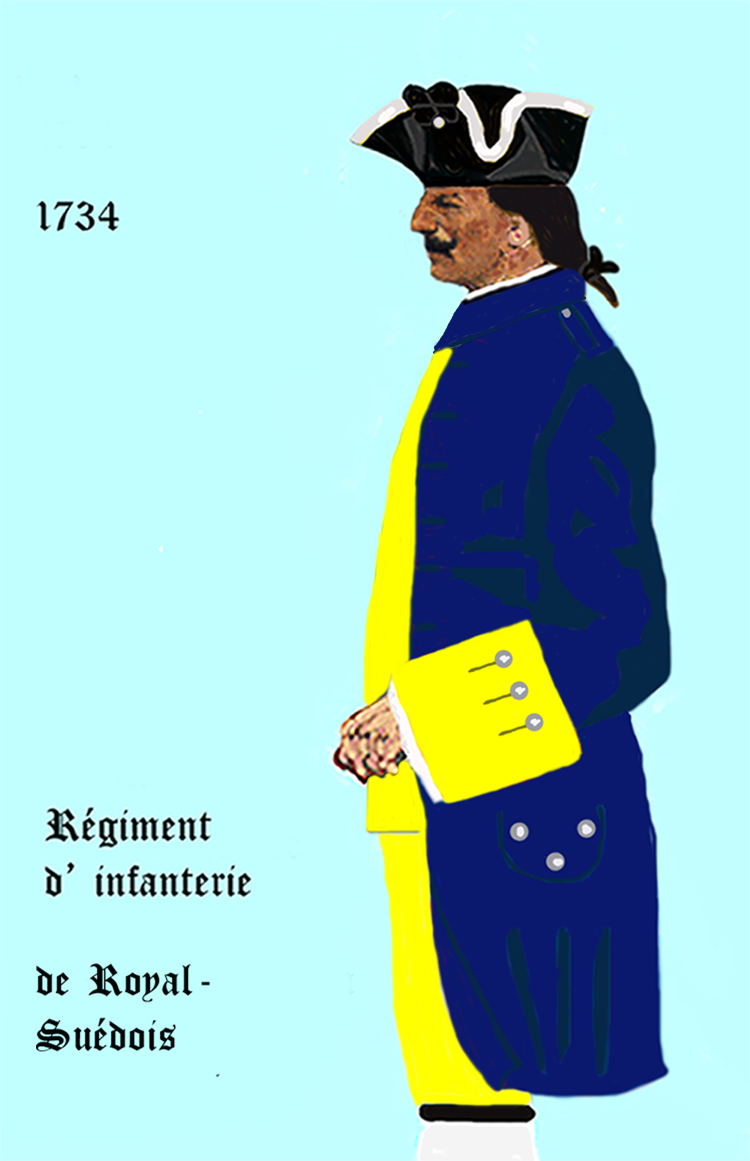
Royal Suédois

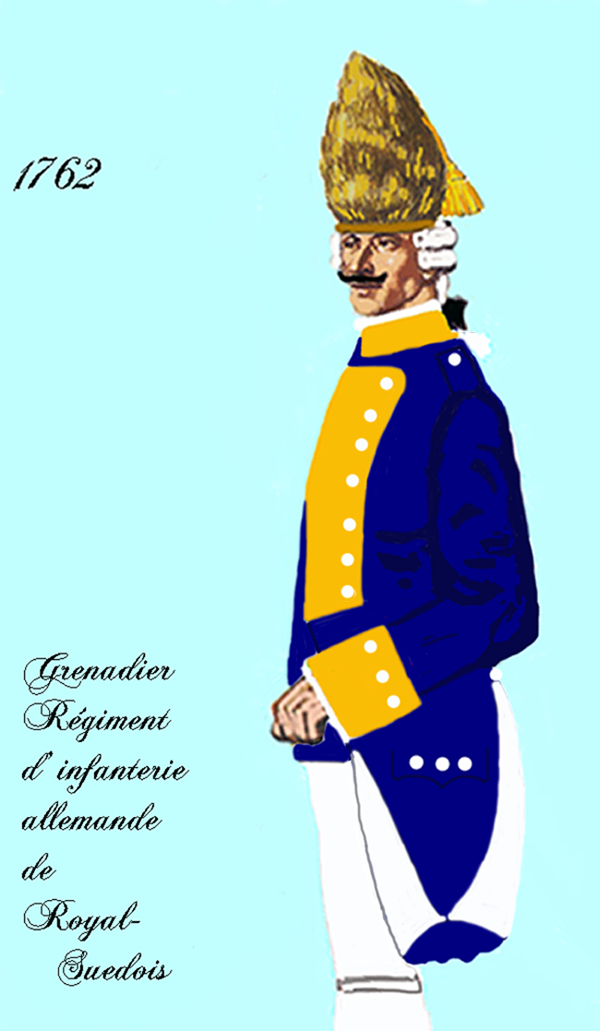
Royal Suédois

Régiment de Königsmarck (Konigsmarck)
Création 1680
→ 1686: Régiment de Surbeck
→ 1693: Régiment de Fürstemberg (Furstemberg)
→ 1697: Régiment de La Marck
→ 1791: 77ème régiment d’infanterie de ligne

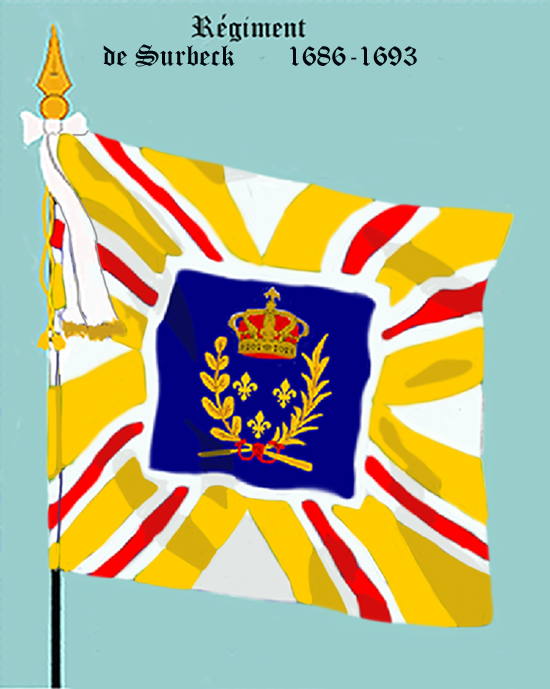
Rég de Surbeck à Rég de La Marck 1730

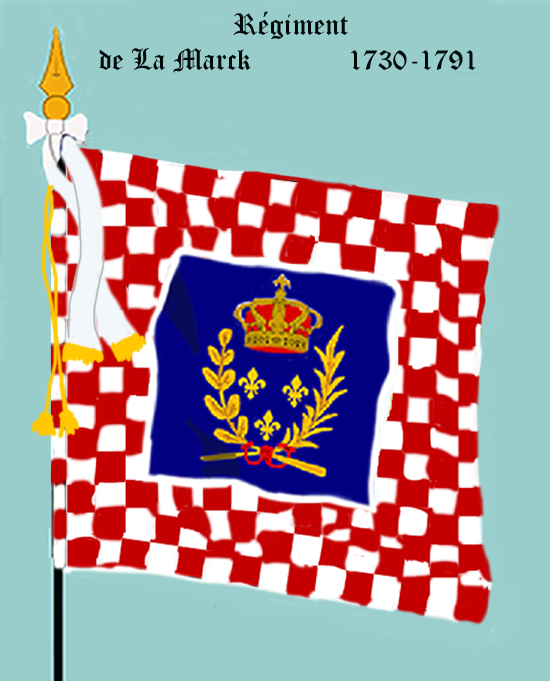
de La Marck 1730–1791

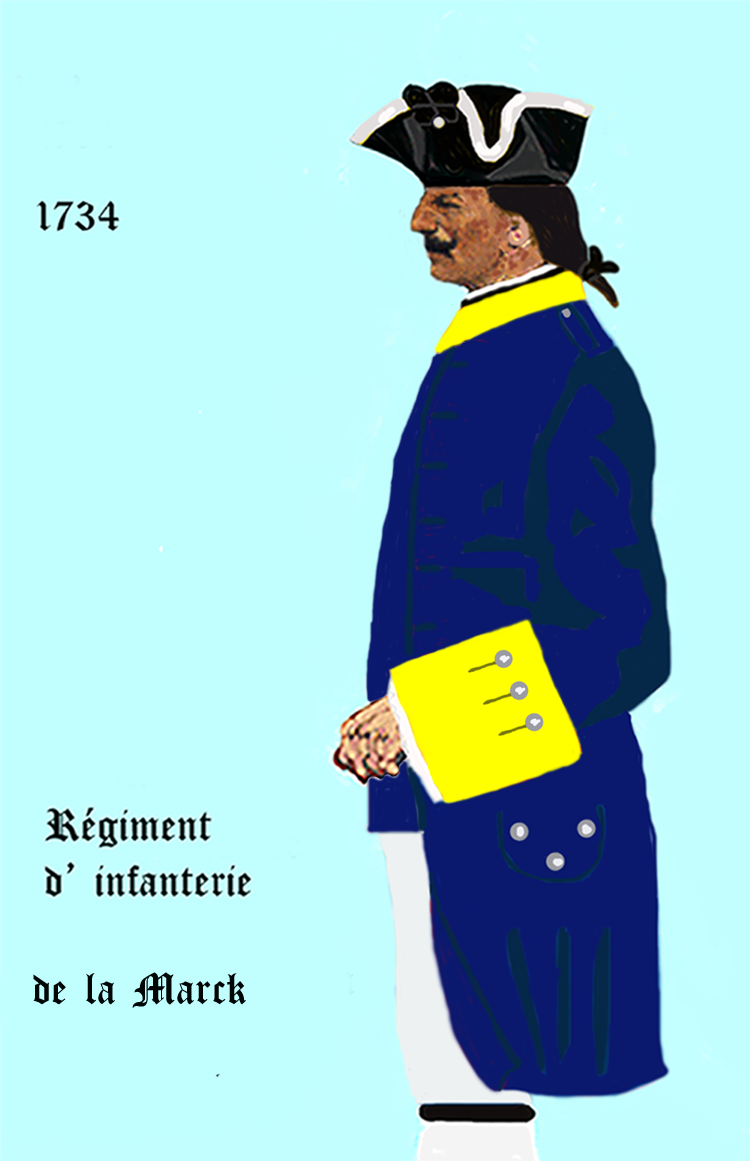
la Marck 1734

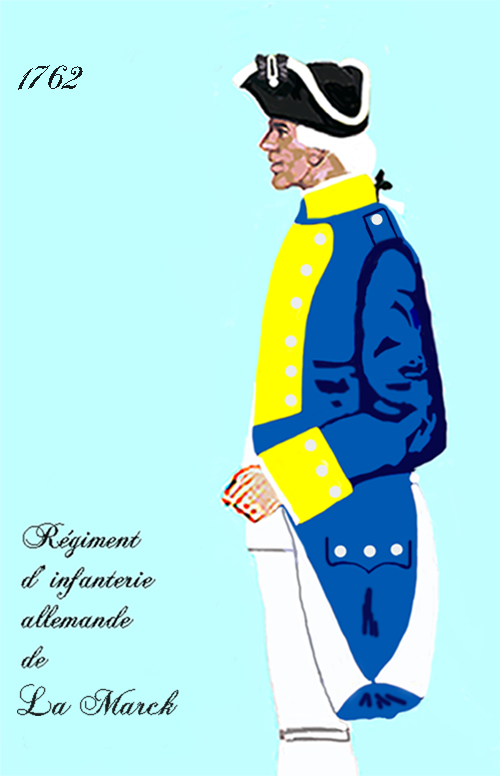
la Marck 1762–1767

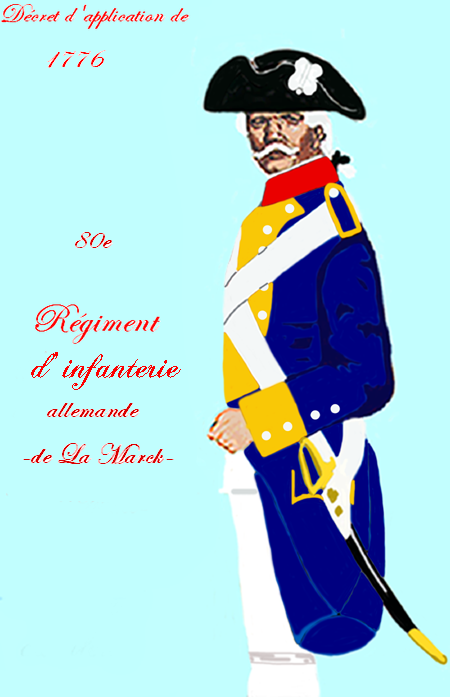
la Marck 1776–1791

Régiment de Royal Bavière
Raised 1709
→ 1780: Règiment de Royal Hesse Darmstadt
→ 1791: 94ème régiment d’infanterie de ligne

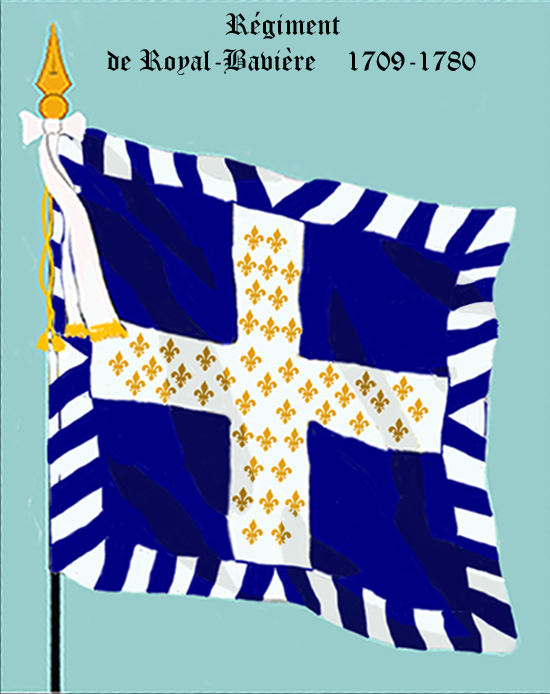
Rég Royal Bavière and Royal Hesse-Darmstadt

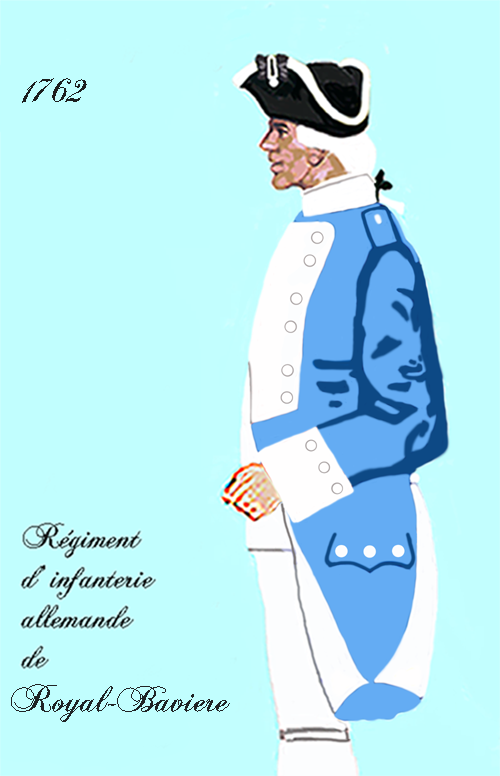
Royal Bavière

Régiment de Royal Deux Ponts
Raised 1757
→ 1791: 99ème régiment d’infanterie de ligne

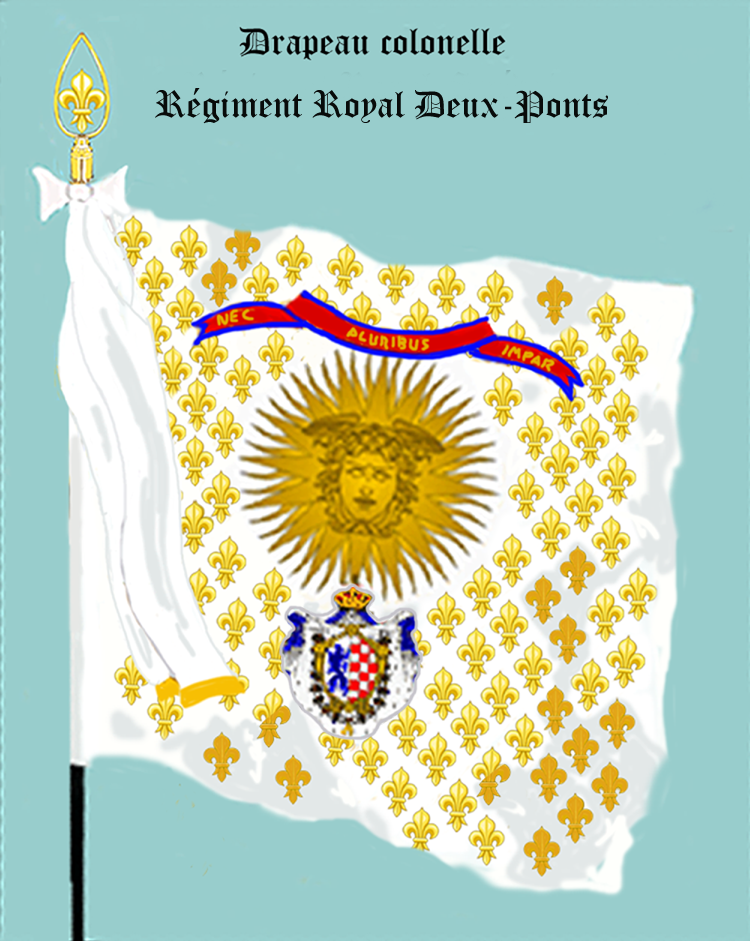
Colonel

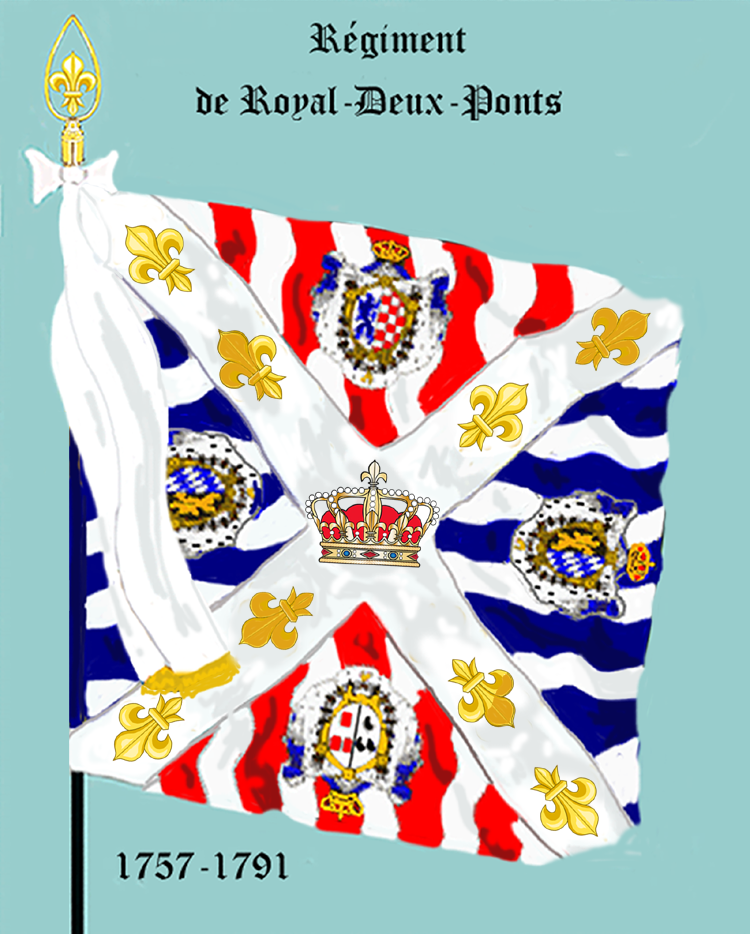
Royal Deux-Ponts

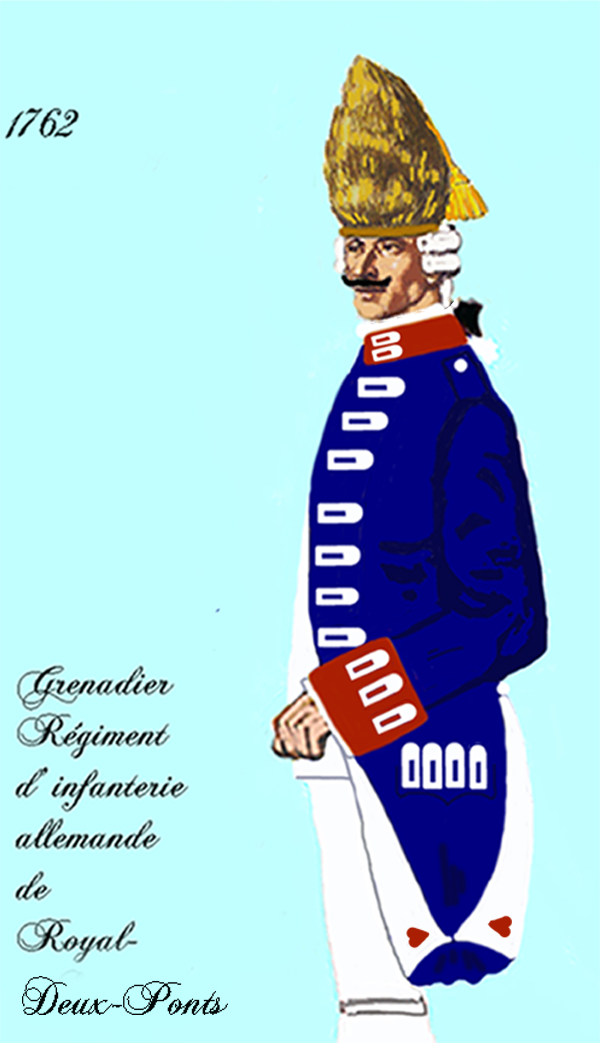
Royal Deux-Ponts 1762–1767

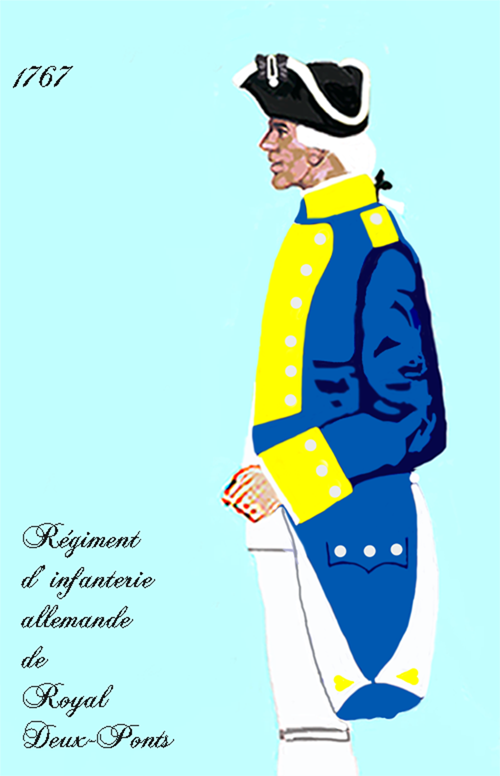
Royal Deux-Ponts 1767–1776

Régiment de Royal-Pologne
Raised 1747 - Disbanded : 1763

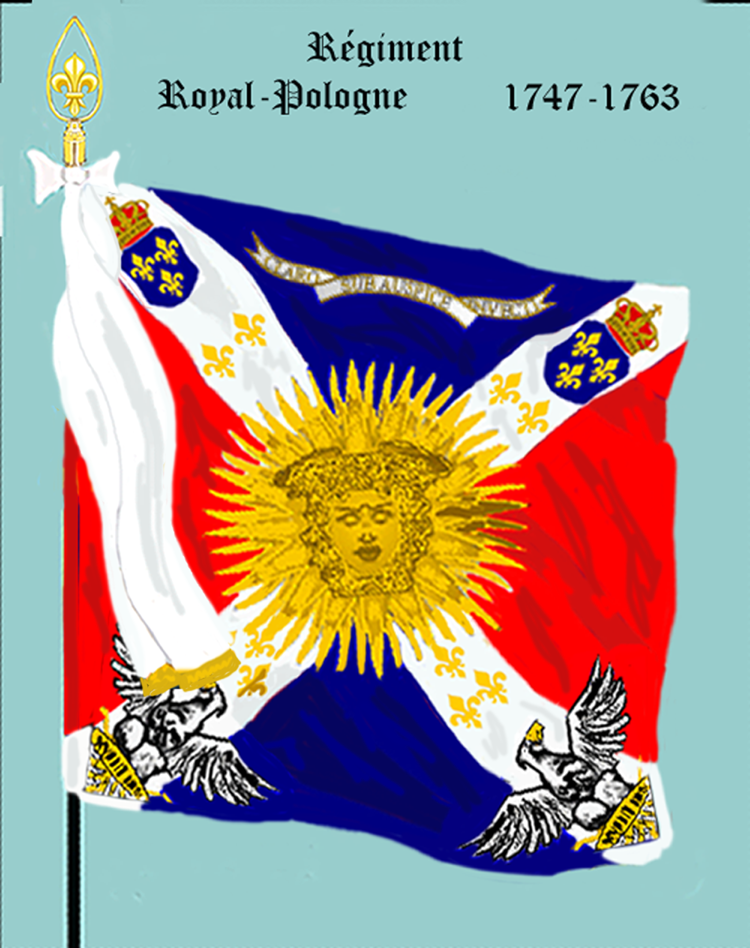
Royal Pologne

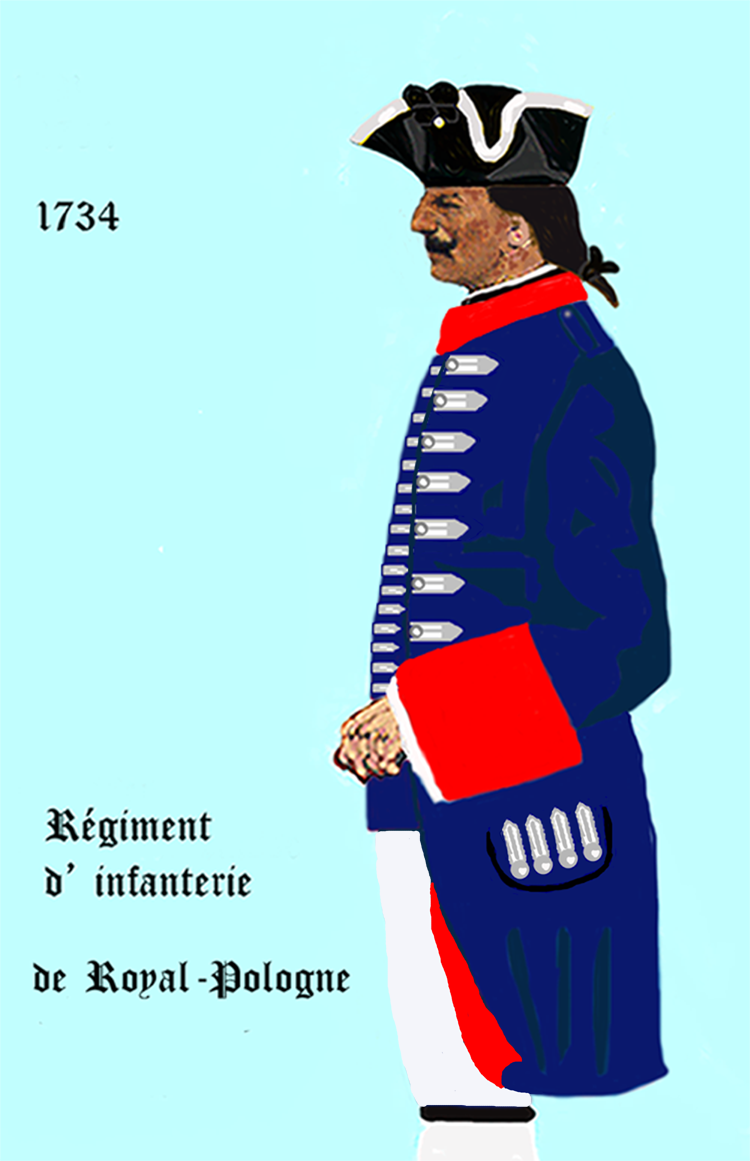
Royal Pologne 1734 - 1757

== Swiss regiments ==
Régiment de Stoppa le Jeune
Raised 1677
→ 1692: Régiment de Surbeck
→ 1714: Régiment de Hemel
→ 1729: Régiment de Bezenwald
→ 1741: Régiment de La Cour au Chantre
→ 1749: Régiment de Grandvillars
→ 1749: Régiment de Balthazar
→ 1754: Régiment de Planta
→ 1760: Régiment d’Arbonnier
→ 1763: Régiment de Jenner
→ 1774: Régiment d’Aulbonne
→ 1783: Régiment de Châteauvieux
→ 1791: 76ème régiment d’infanterie de ligne

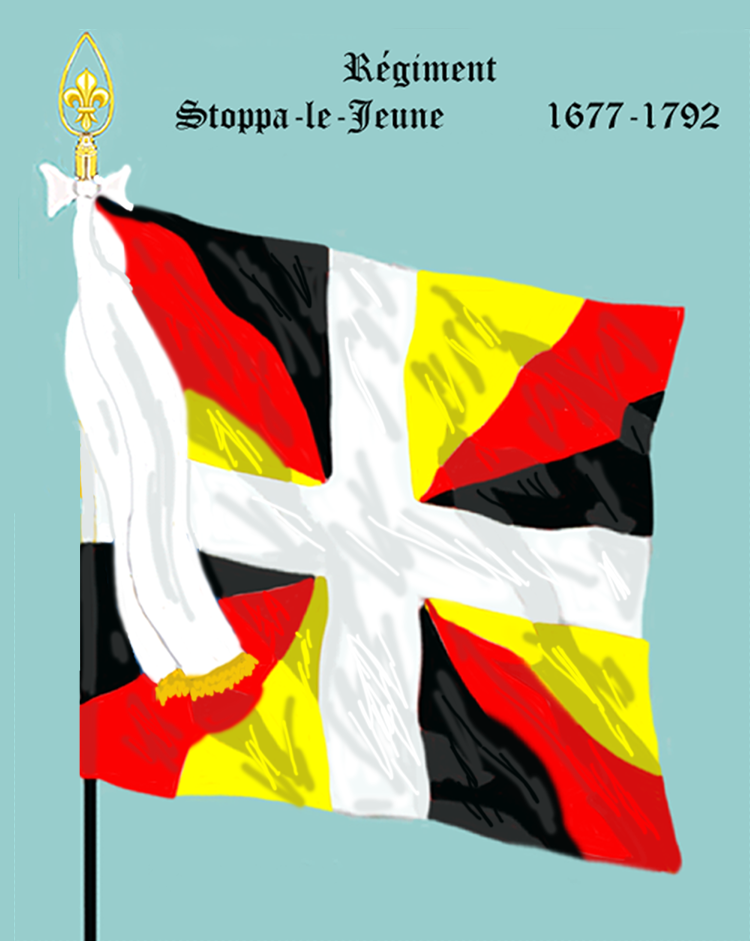
Stoppa le Jeune

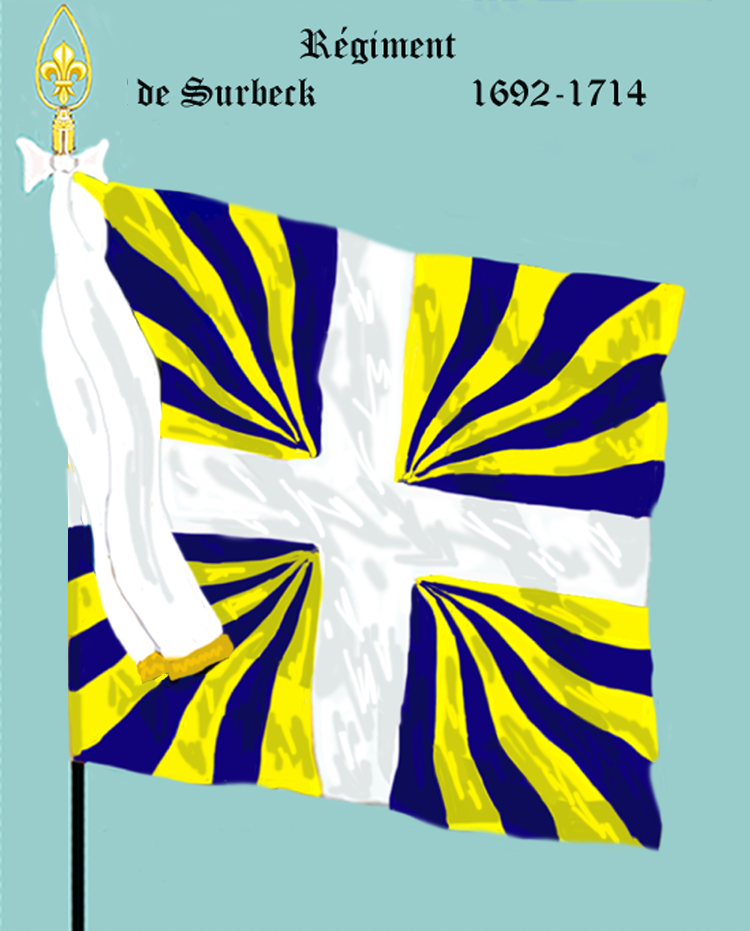
Rég Surbeck, La Cour au Chantre, Grandvillars, Balthazar

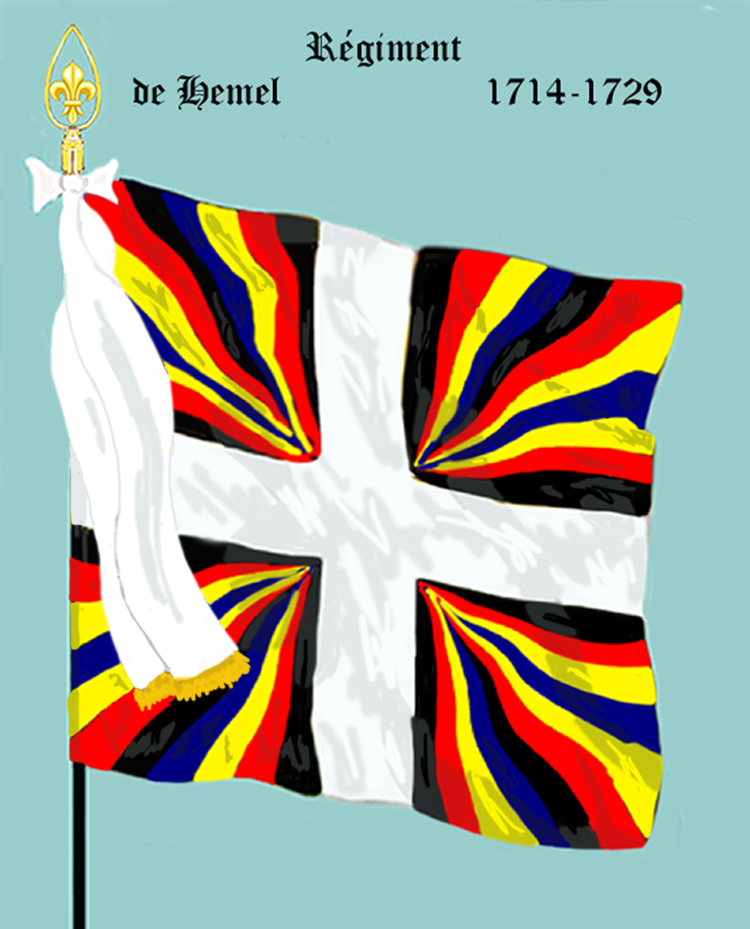
Rég Hemel, Planta, Abonnier

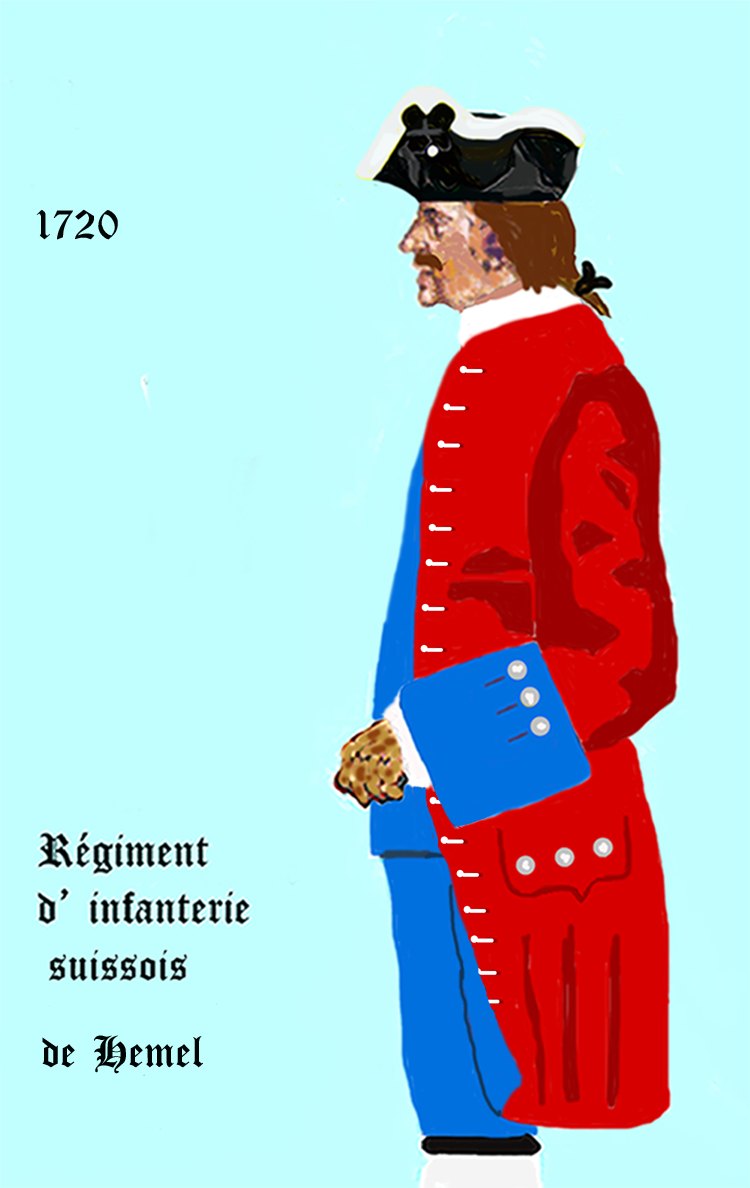
Hemel 1720–1729

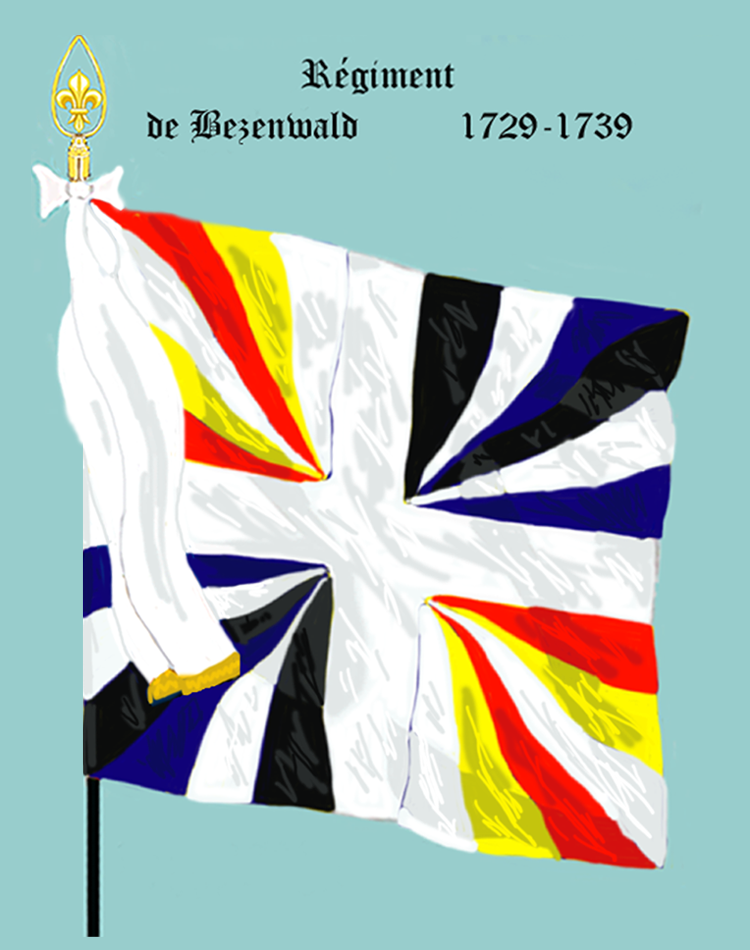
Bezenwald

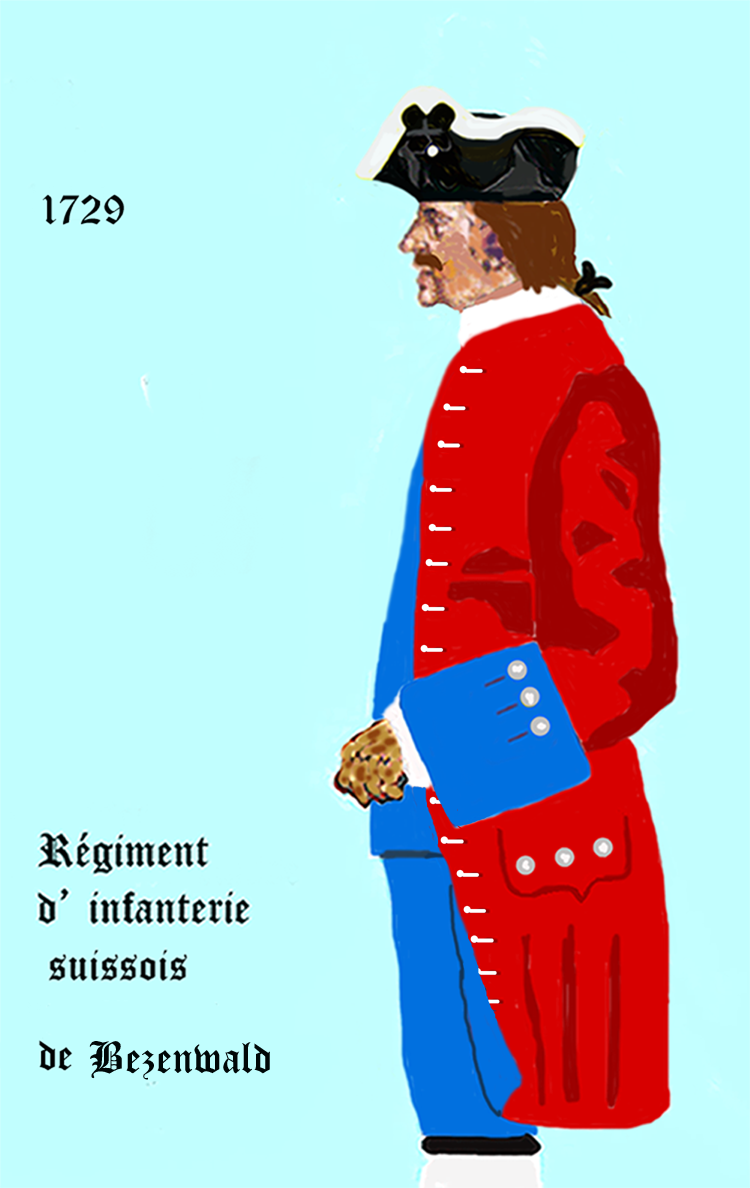
Bezenwald 1729–1734

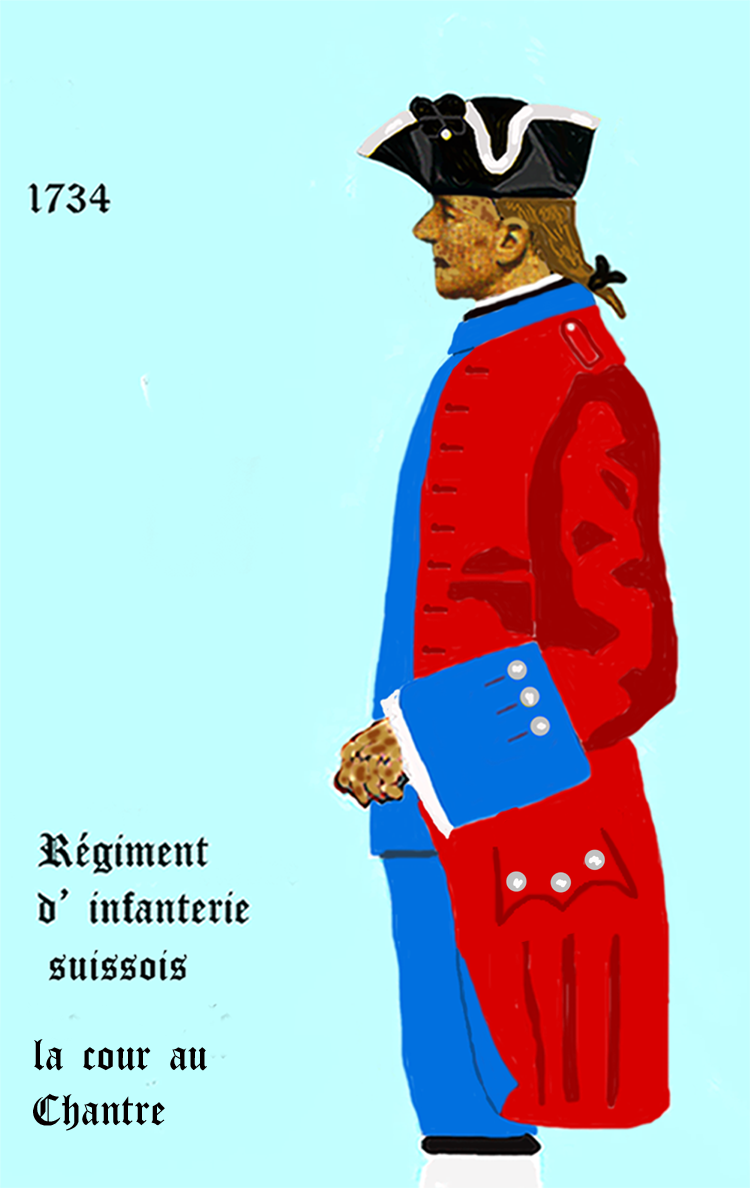
La Cour au Chantre 1734

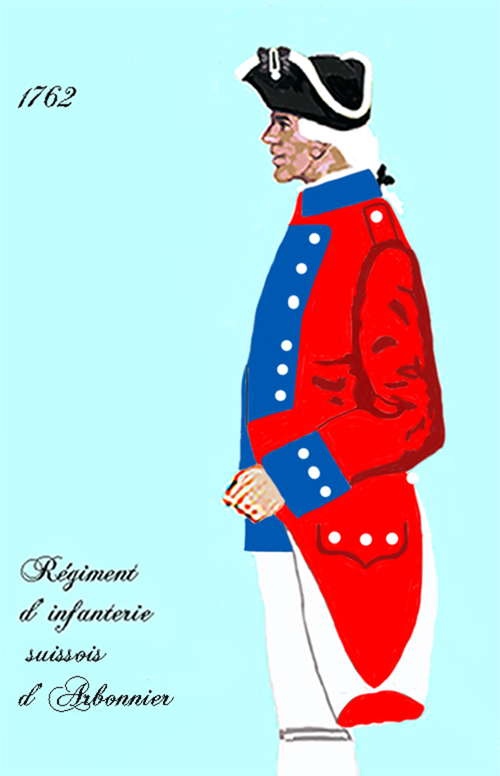
Abonnier 1762–1767

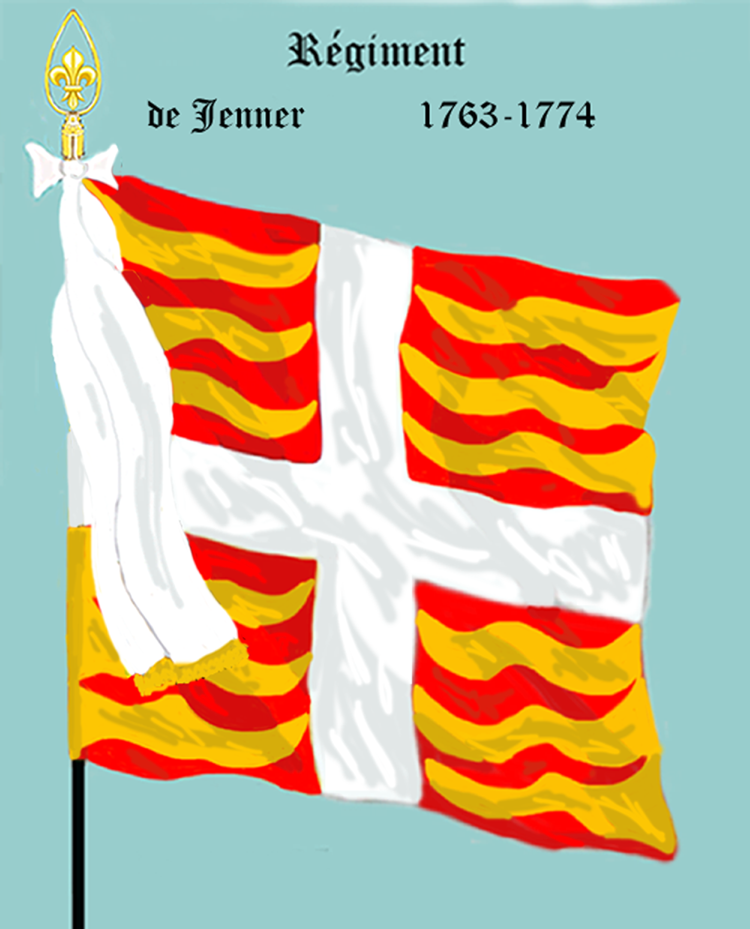
Rég de Jenner, d'Aulbonne, & de Châteauvieux

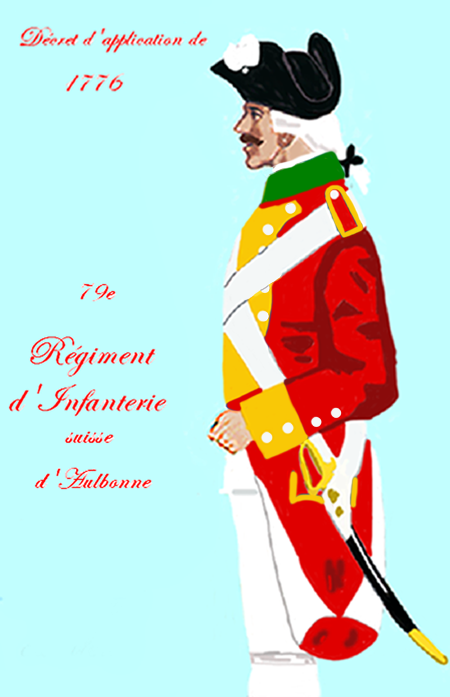
Aulbonne 1776

Régiment de Greder
Raised1673
→ 1714: Régiment d’Affry
→ 1734: Régiment de Wittmer
→ 1757: Régiment de Waldner
→ 1783: Régiment de Vigier
→ 1791: 69ème régiment d’infanterie de ligne

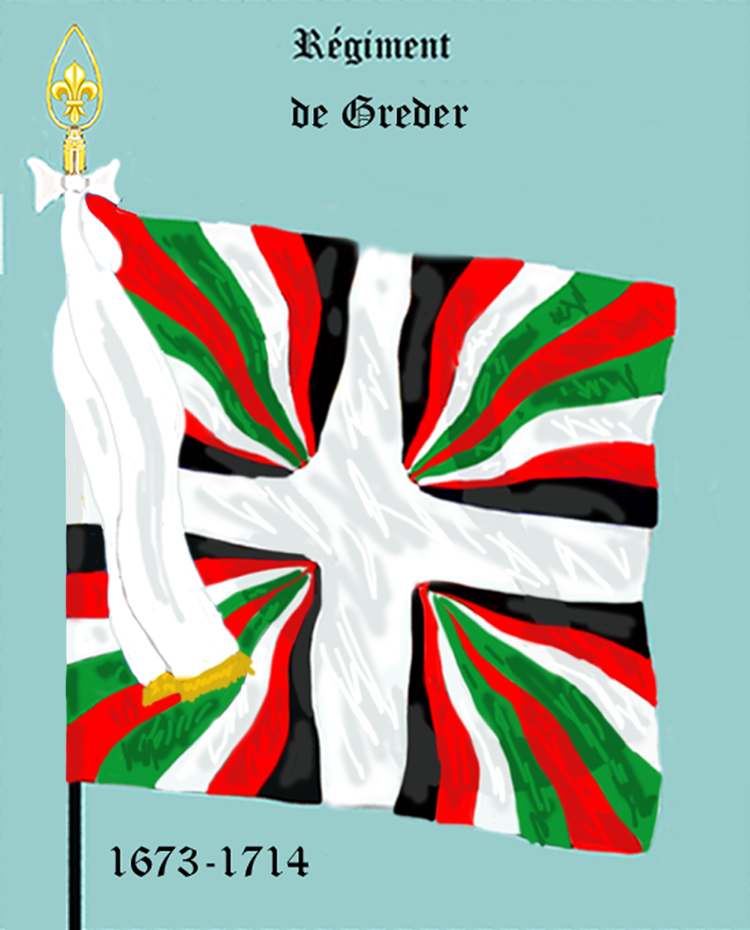
Greder

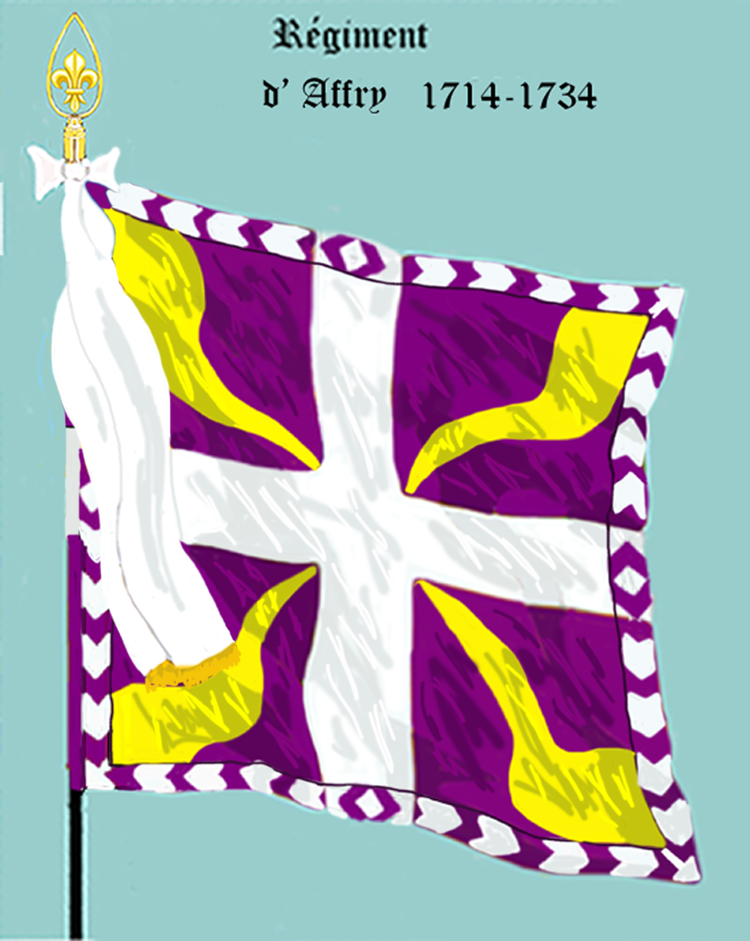
Affry

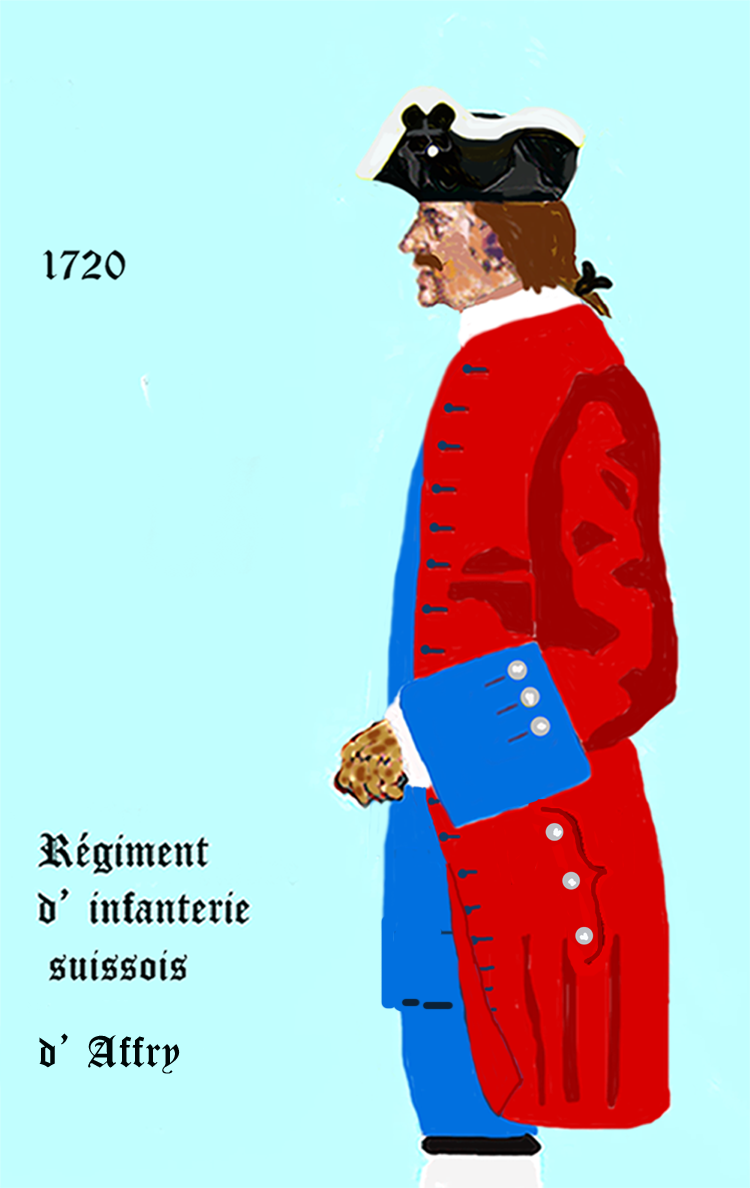
Affry 1729

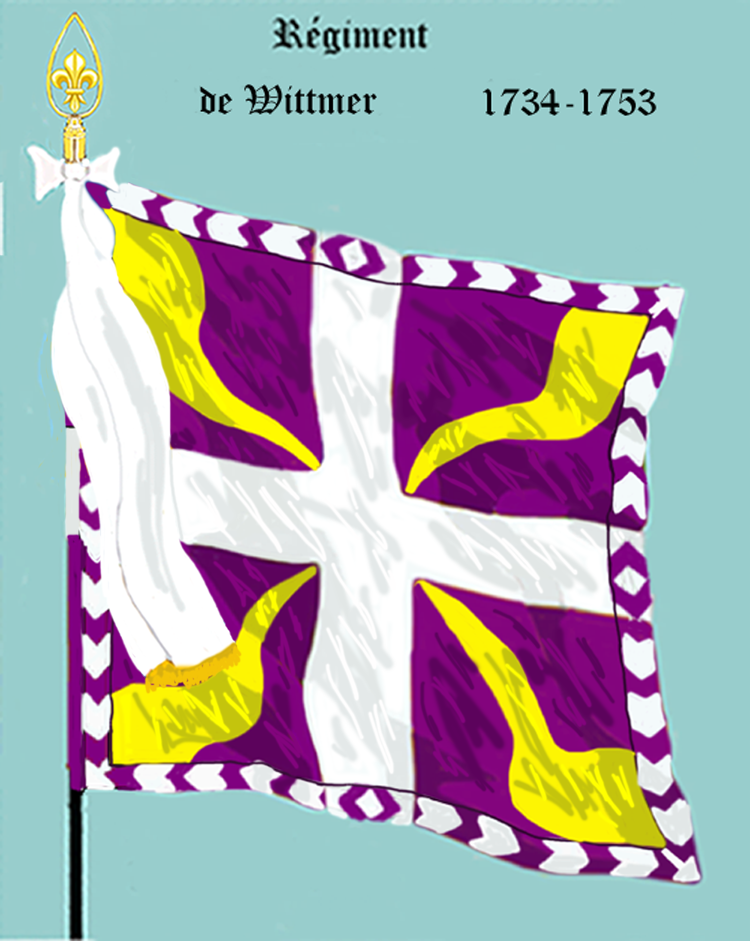
Wittmer 1734

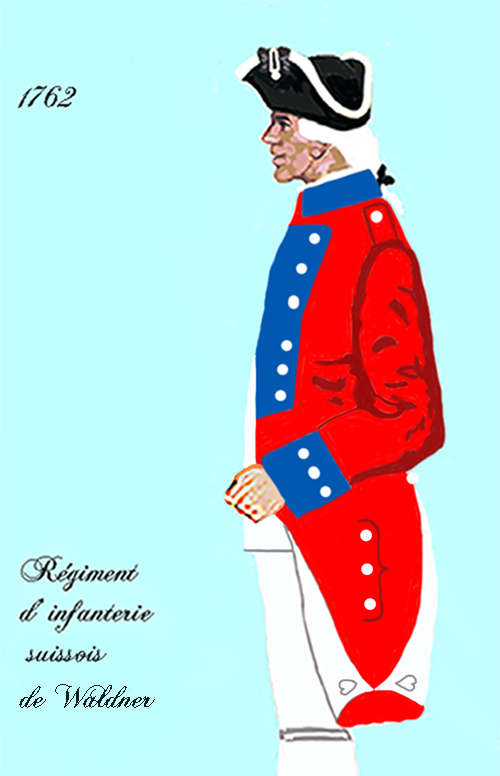
Waldner 1762

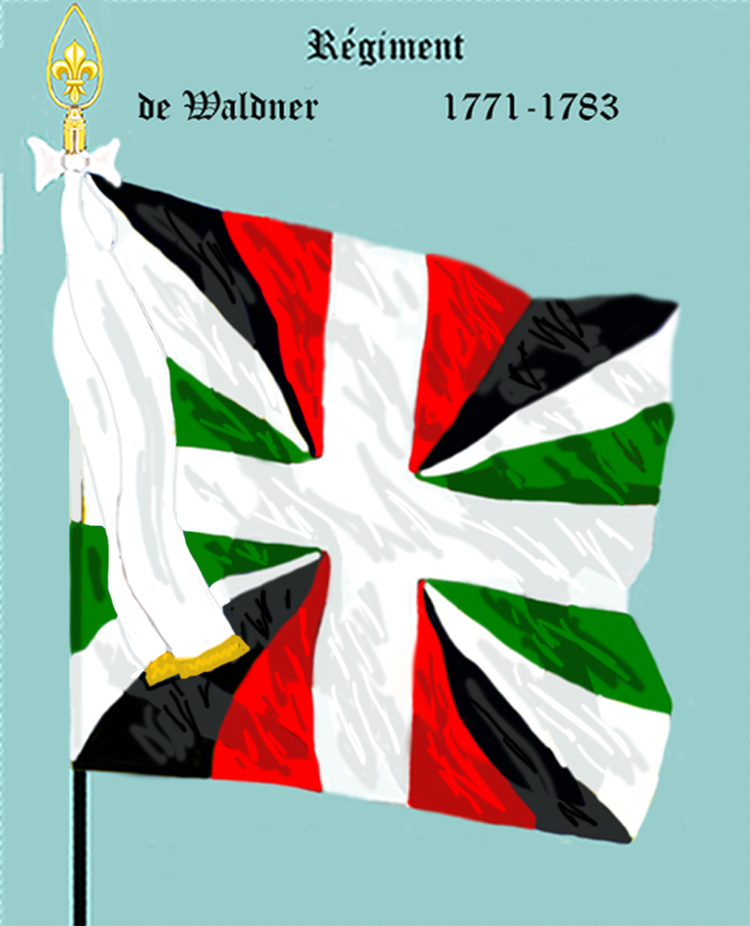
Waldner 1771

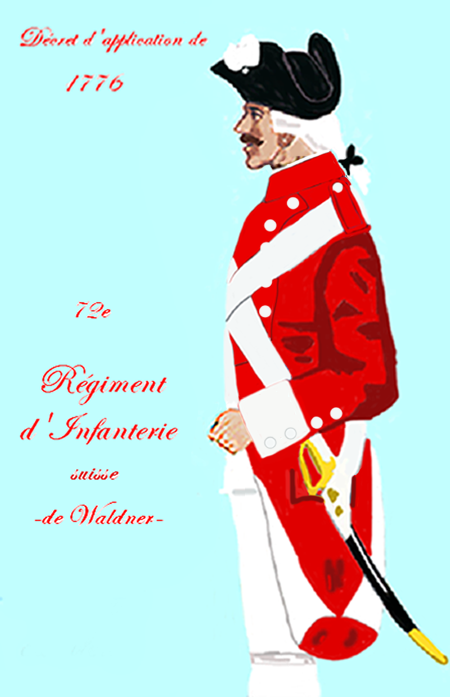
Waldner 1776

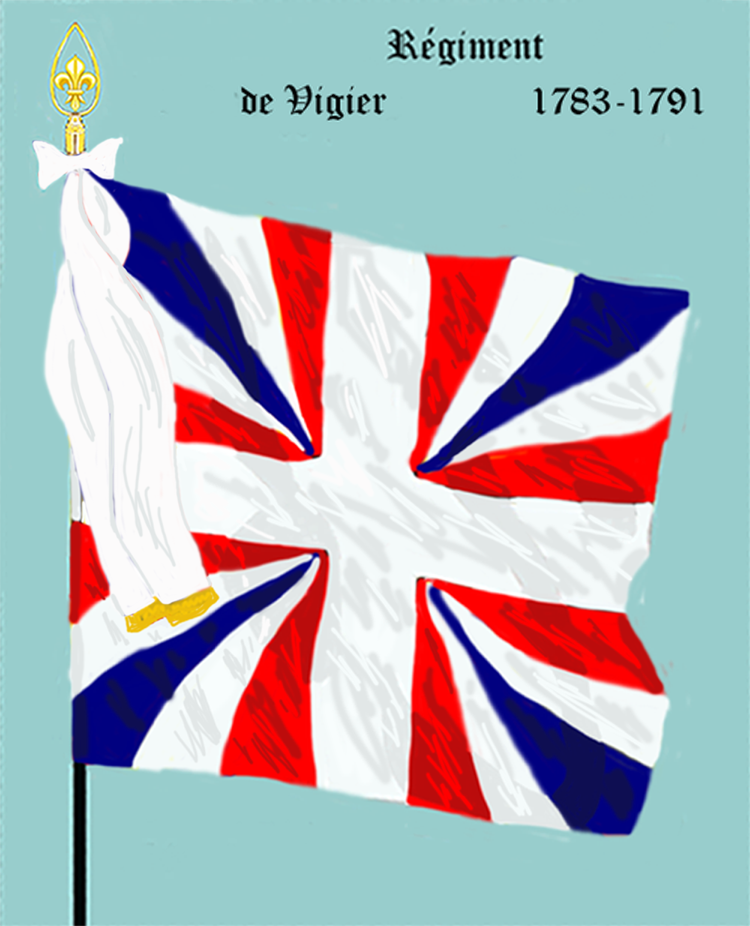
Vigier 1783

Régiment de Salis
Raised 1672
→ 1690: Régiment de Pollier
→ 1692: Régiment de Reynold
→ 1702: Régiment de Castellas (Castella)
→ 1722: Régiment de Bettens
→ 1739: Régiment de Monin
→ 1756: Régiment de Reding
→ 1763: Régiment de Pfyffer
→ 1768: Régiment de Sonnenberg
→ 1791: 65ème régiment d’infanterie de ligne

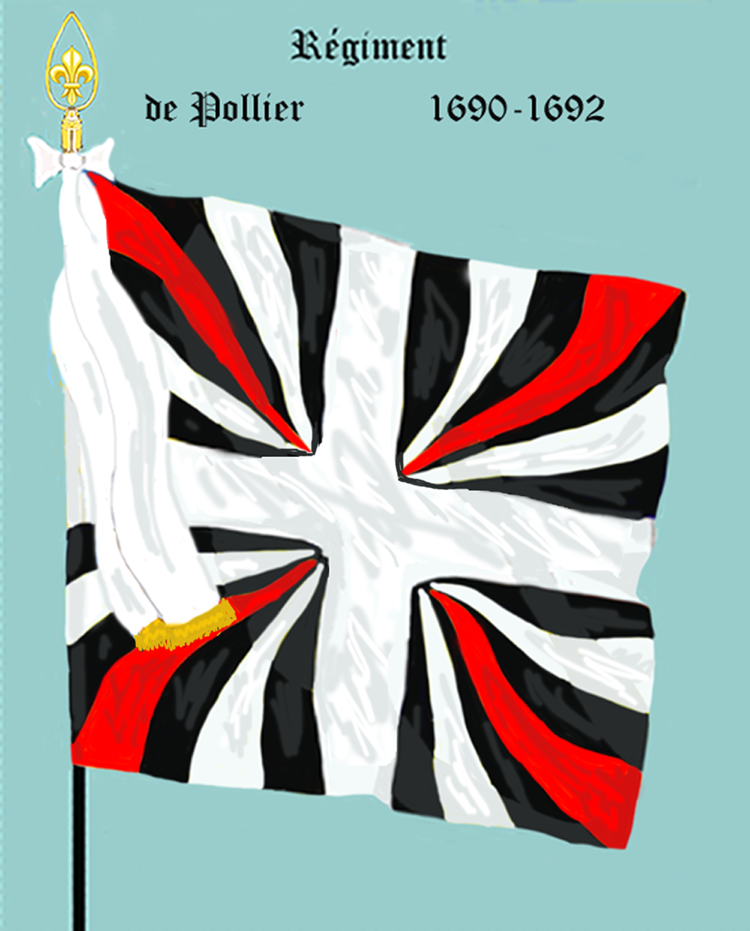
Pollier

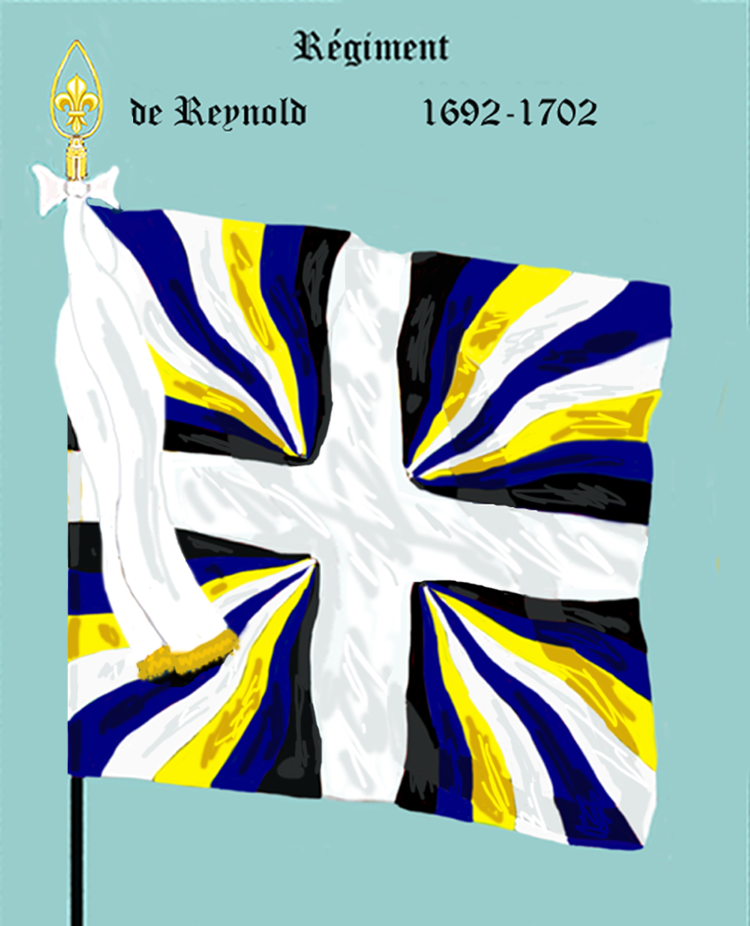
Reynold

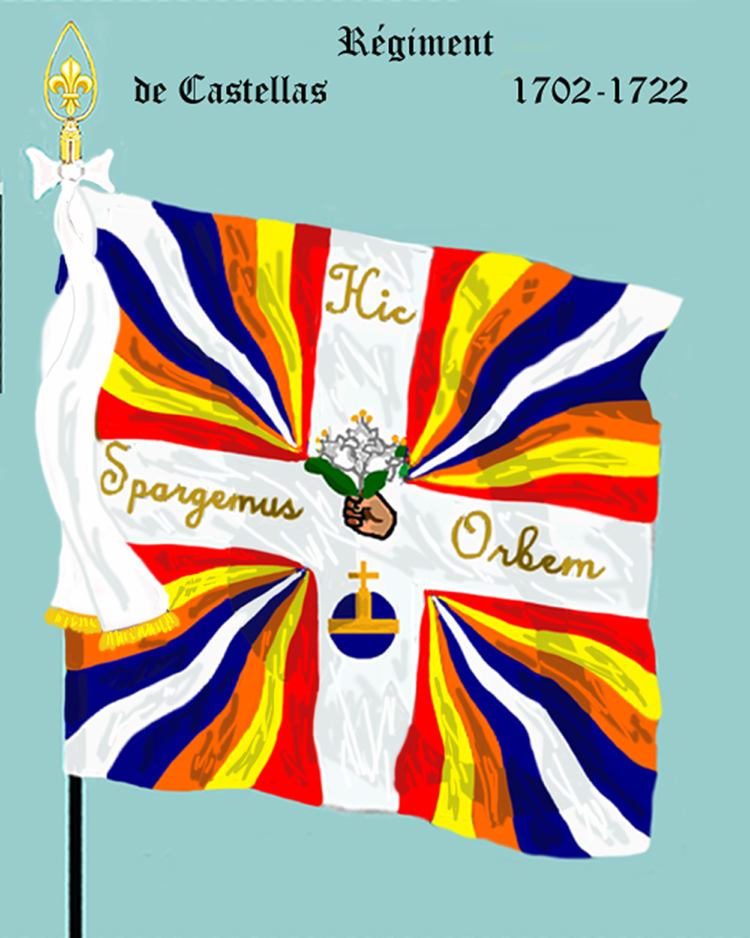
Castellas

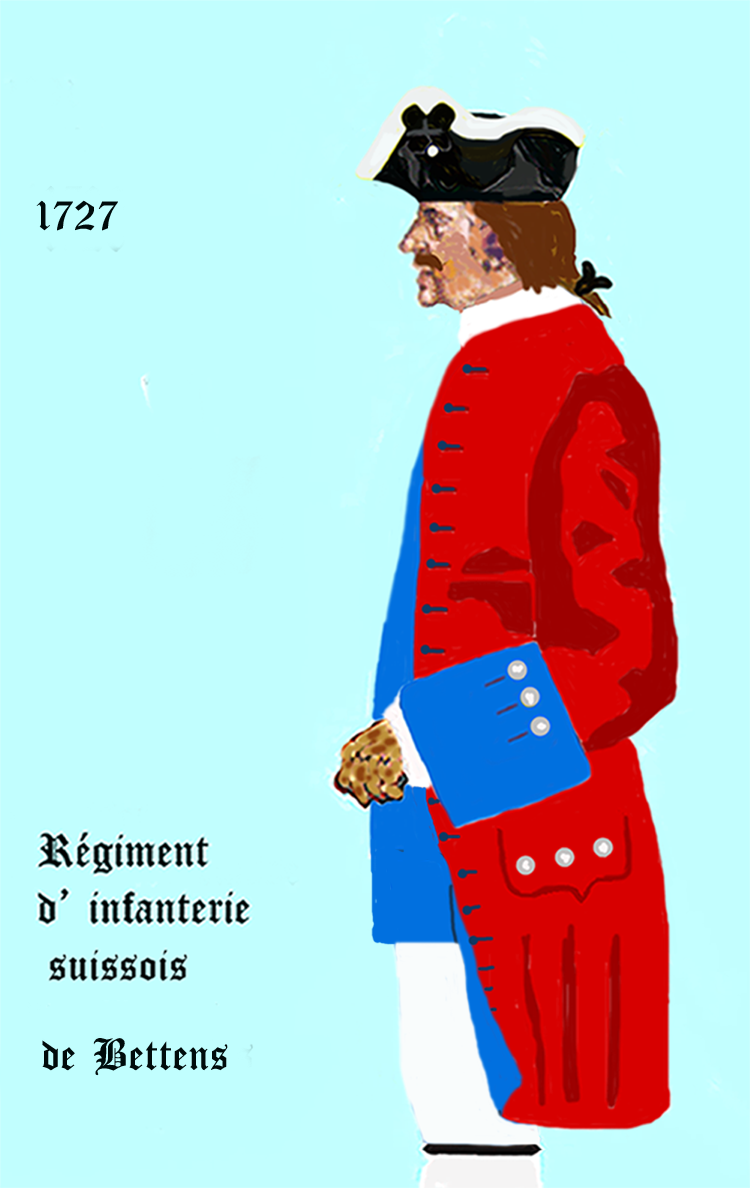
Bettens 1727

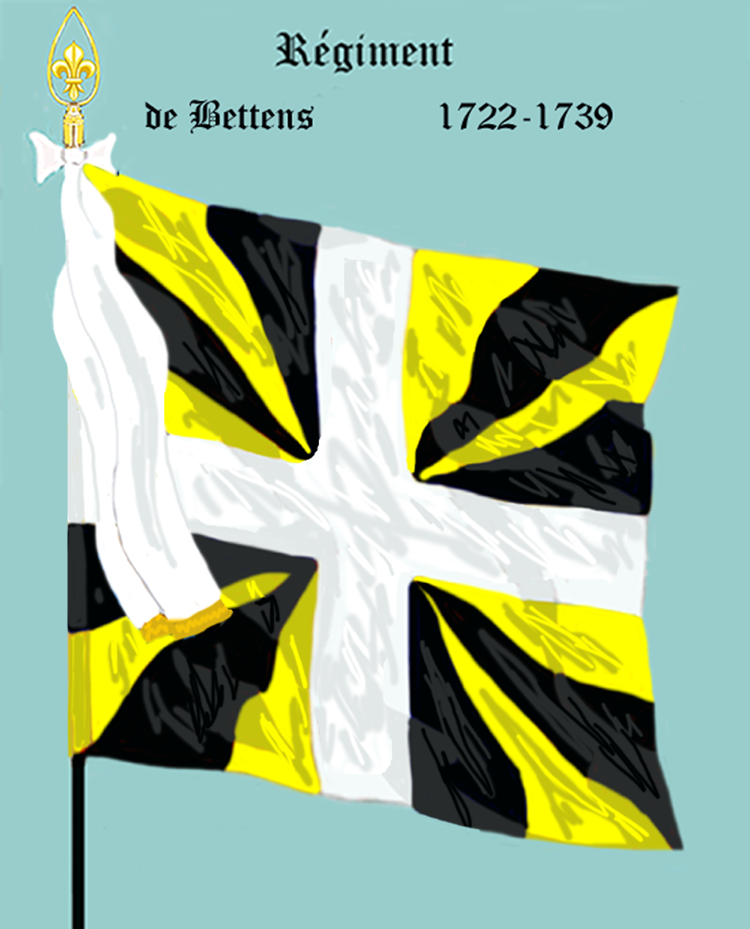
Bettens

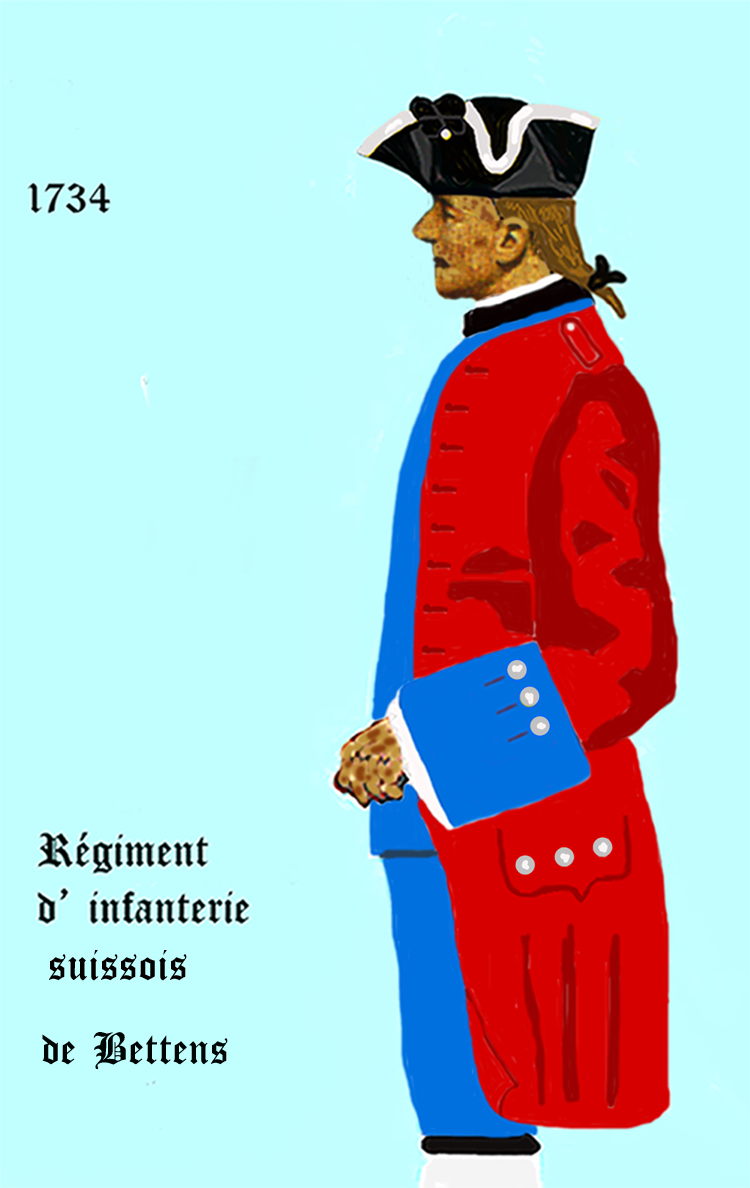
Bettens 1734

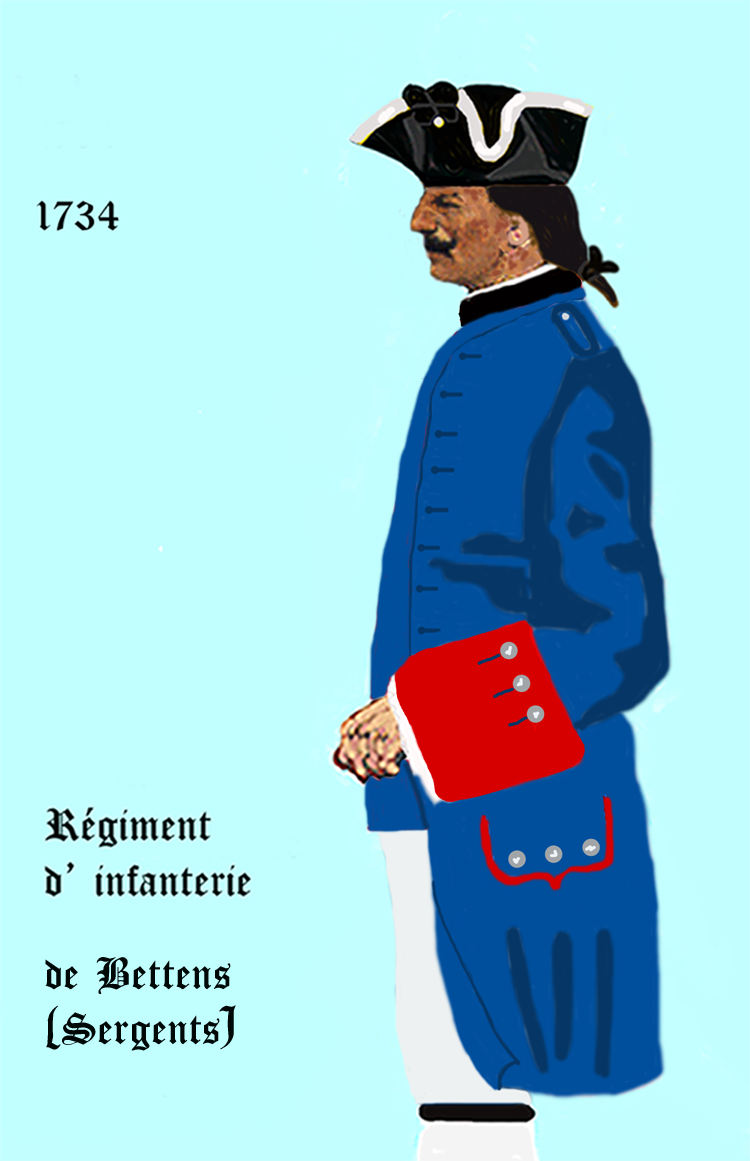
Bettens (sergeants 1734

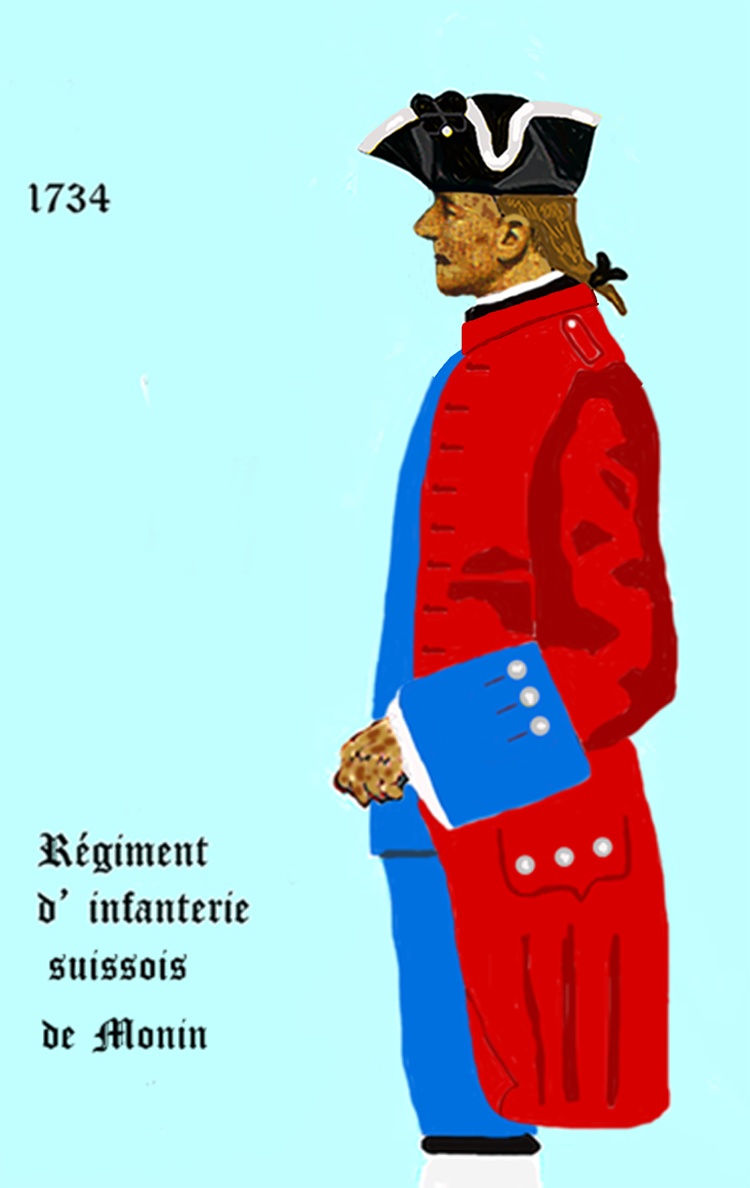
Monnin 1739

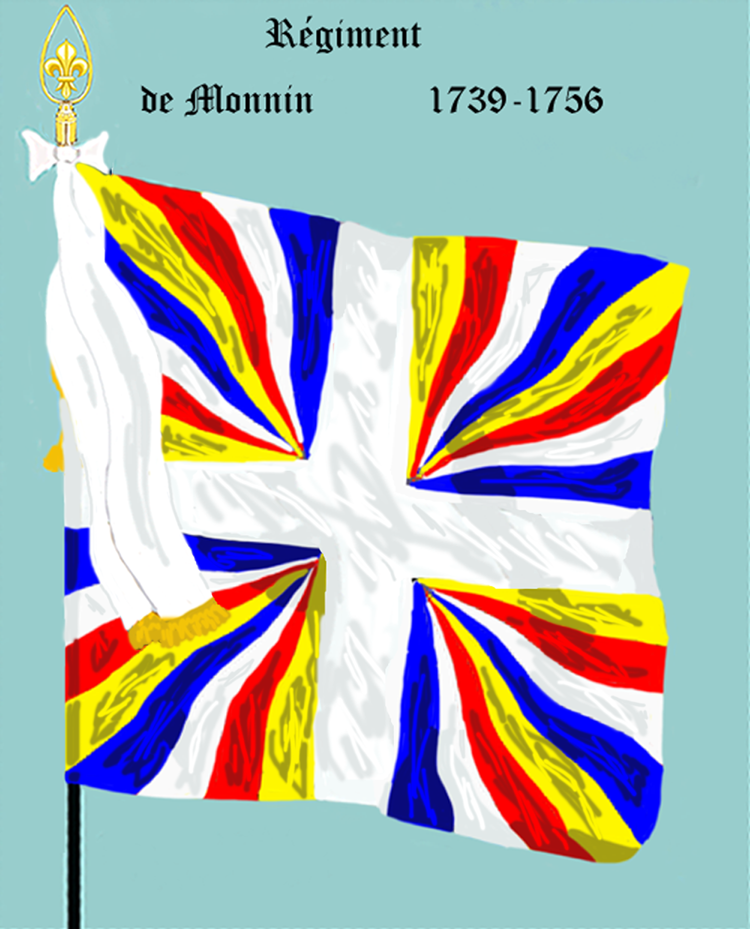
Monnin

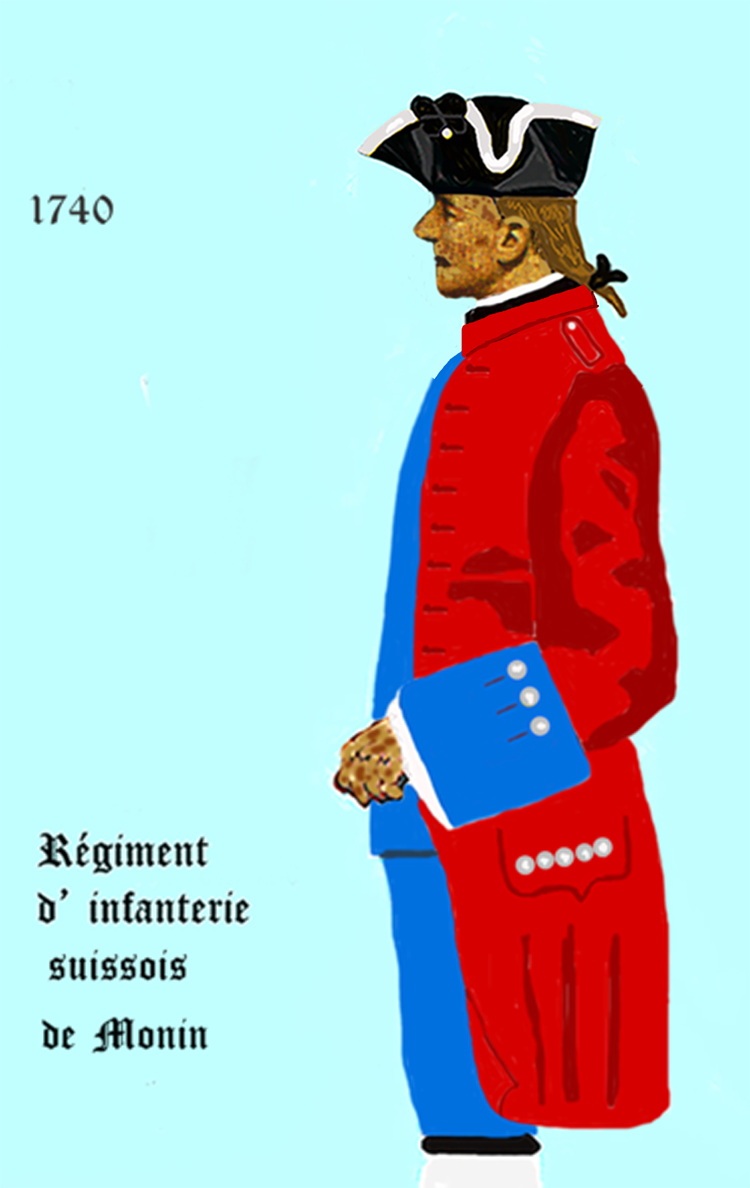
Monin 1740

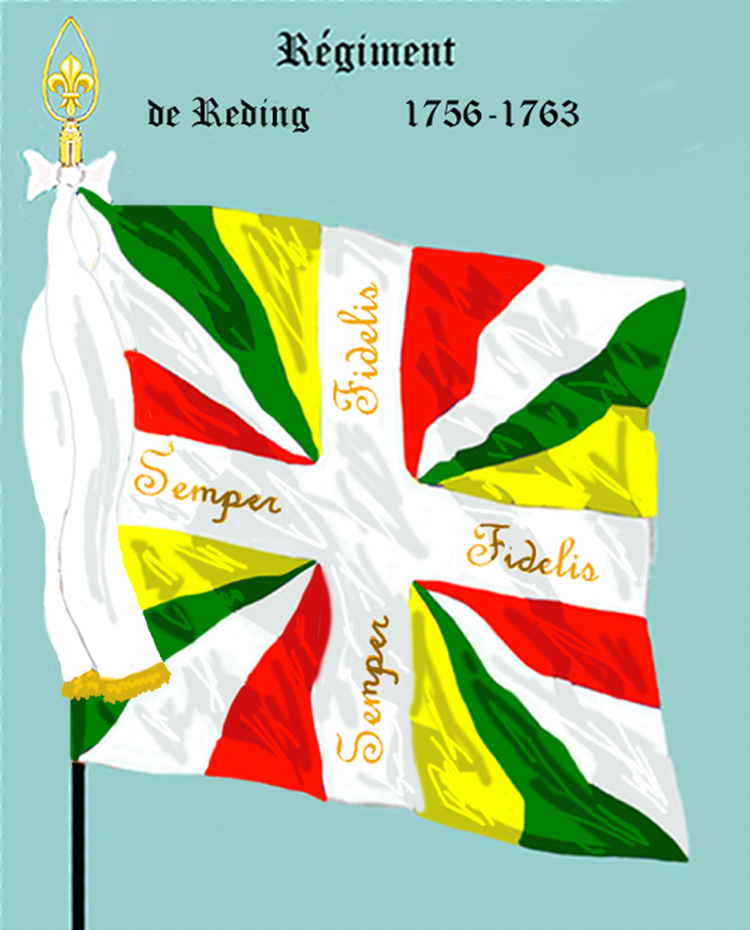
de Reding 1756

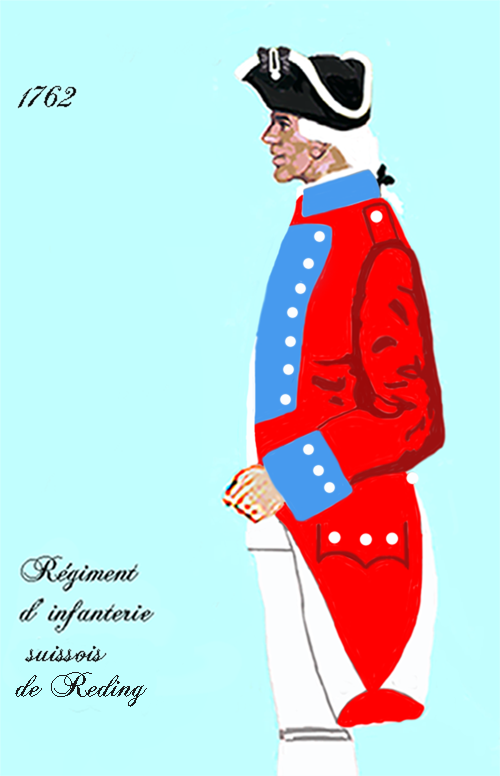
Reding 1762

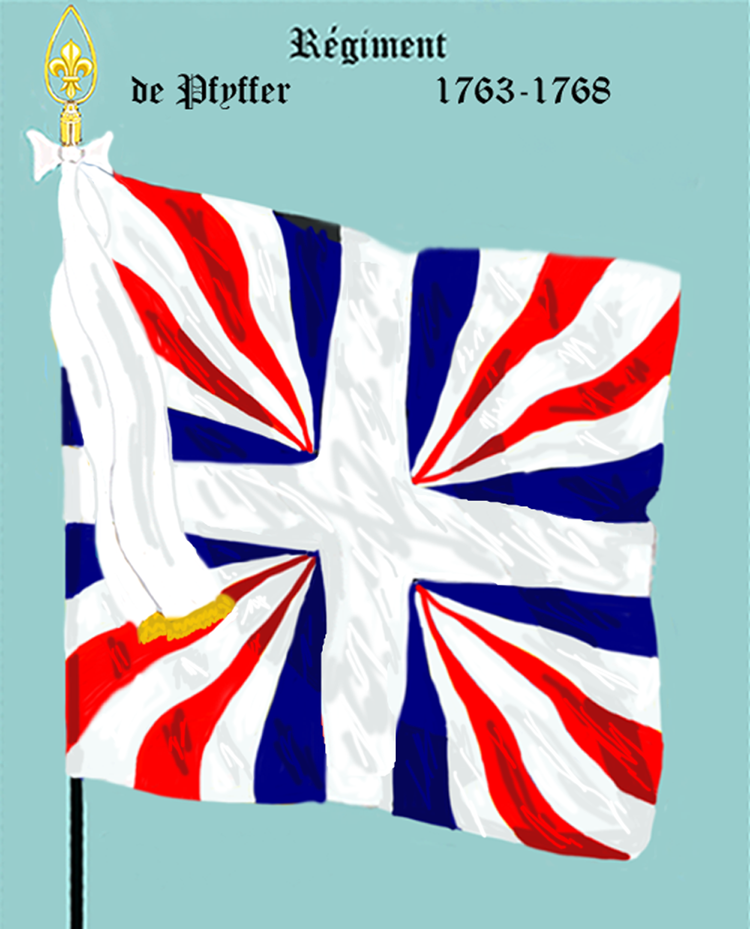
Pfyffer

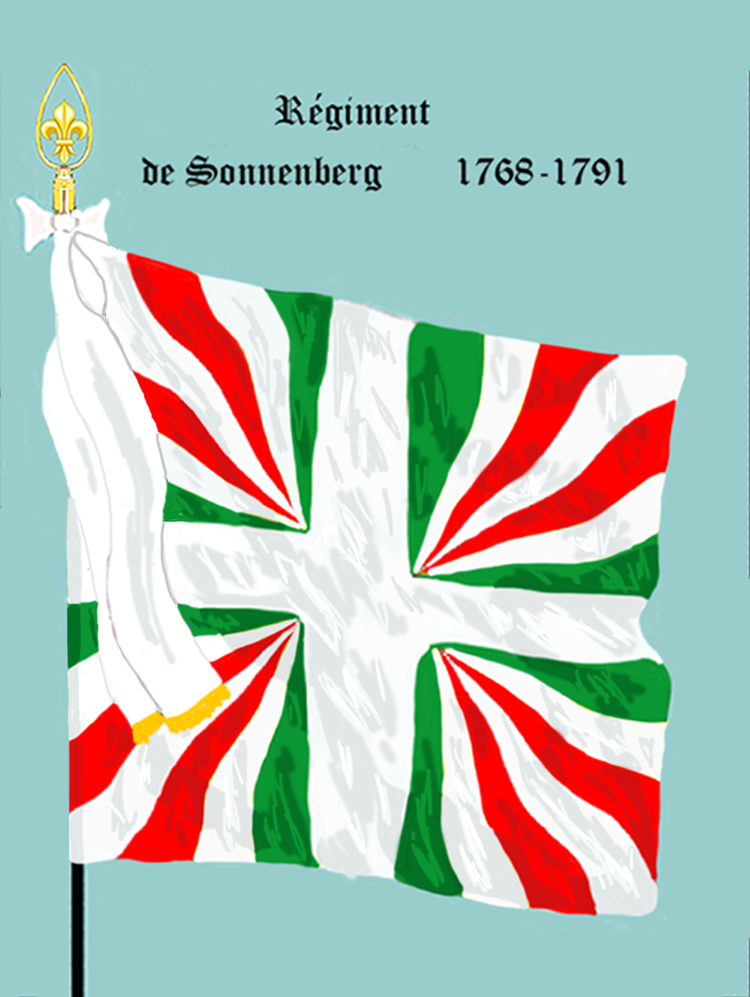
Sonnenberg

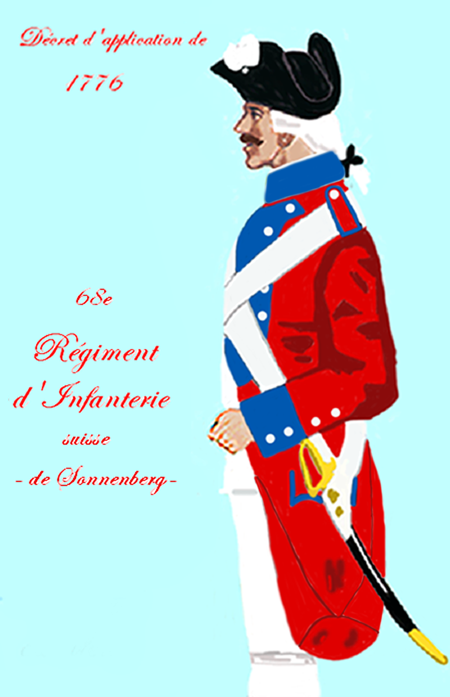
Sonnenberg 1776

Régiment d’Erlach
Raised 1671
→ 1694: Régiment de Manuel
→ 1701: Régiment de Villars-Chandieu
→ 1728: Régiment de May
→ 1739: Régiment de Bettens
→ 1751: Régiment de Jenner
→ 1762: Régiment d’Erlach
→ 1782: Régiment d’Ernest
→ 1791: 63ème régiment d’infanterie de ligne

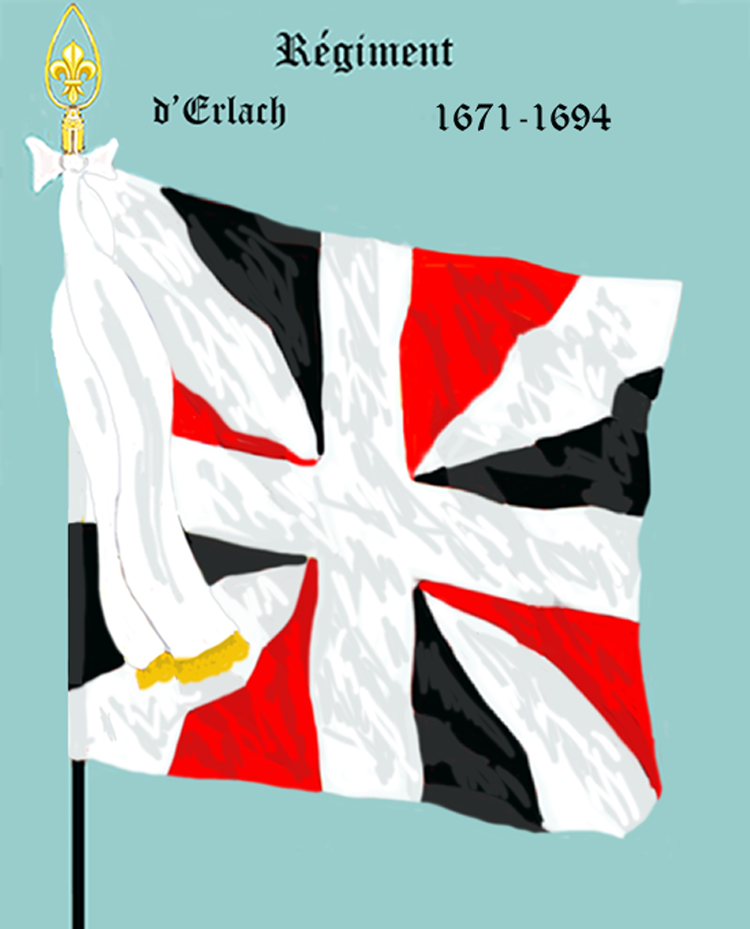
Erlach 1671

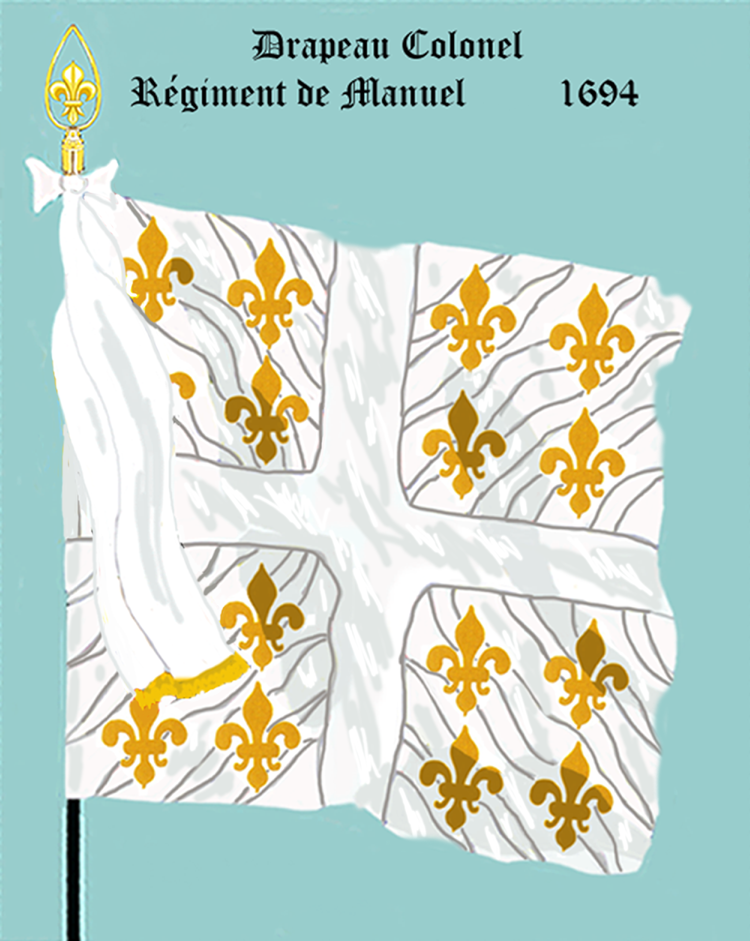
Colonel 1694–1701

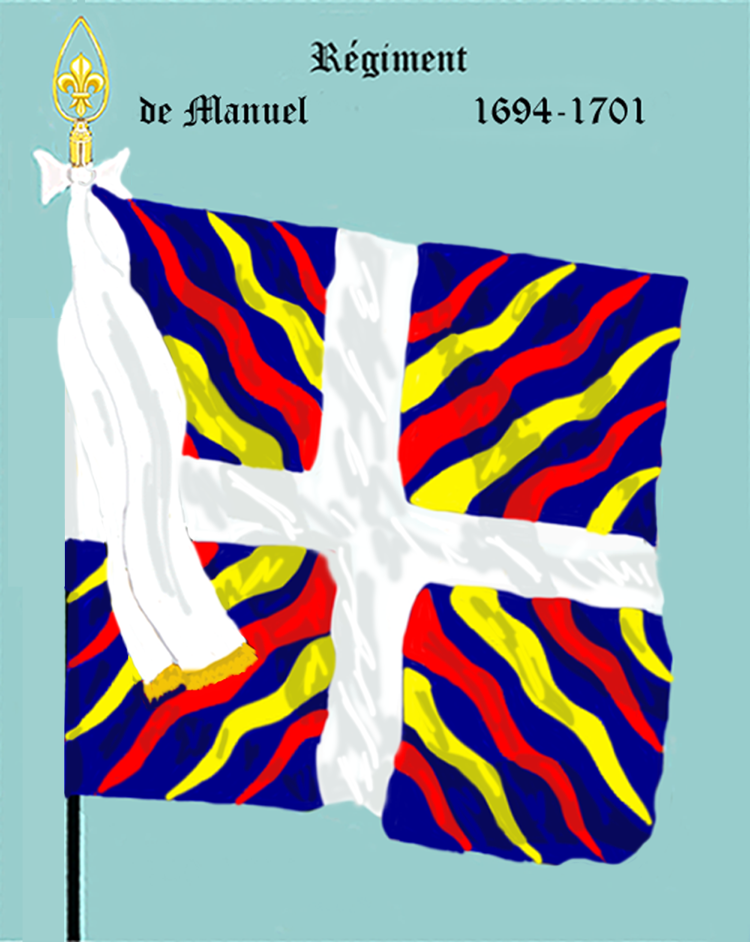
Manuel

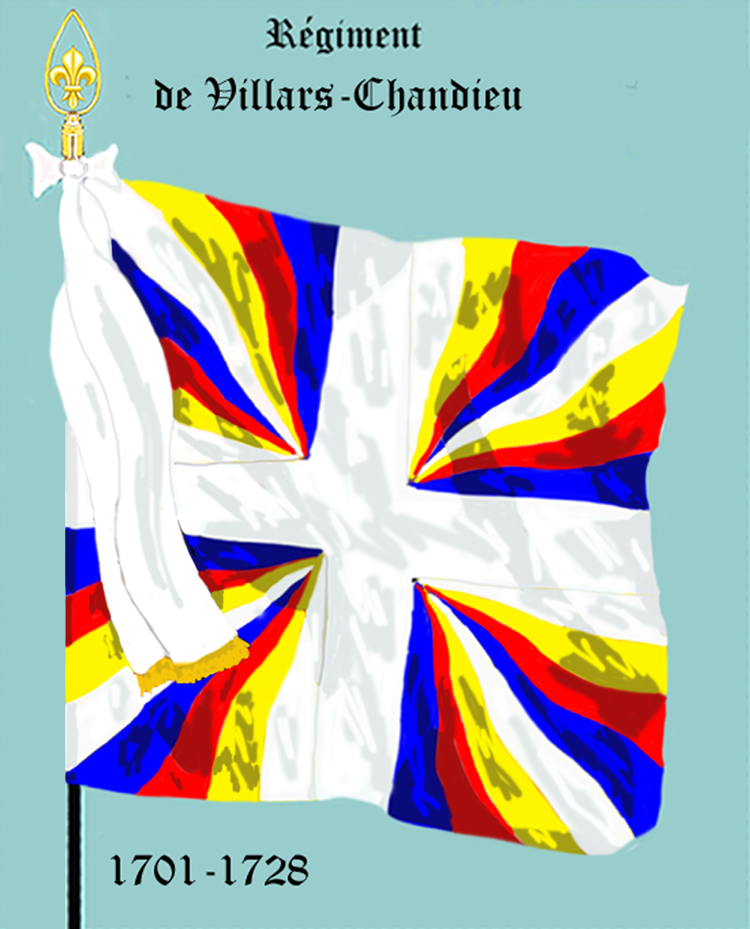
Villars-Chandieu

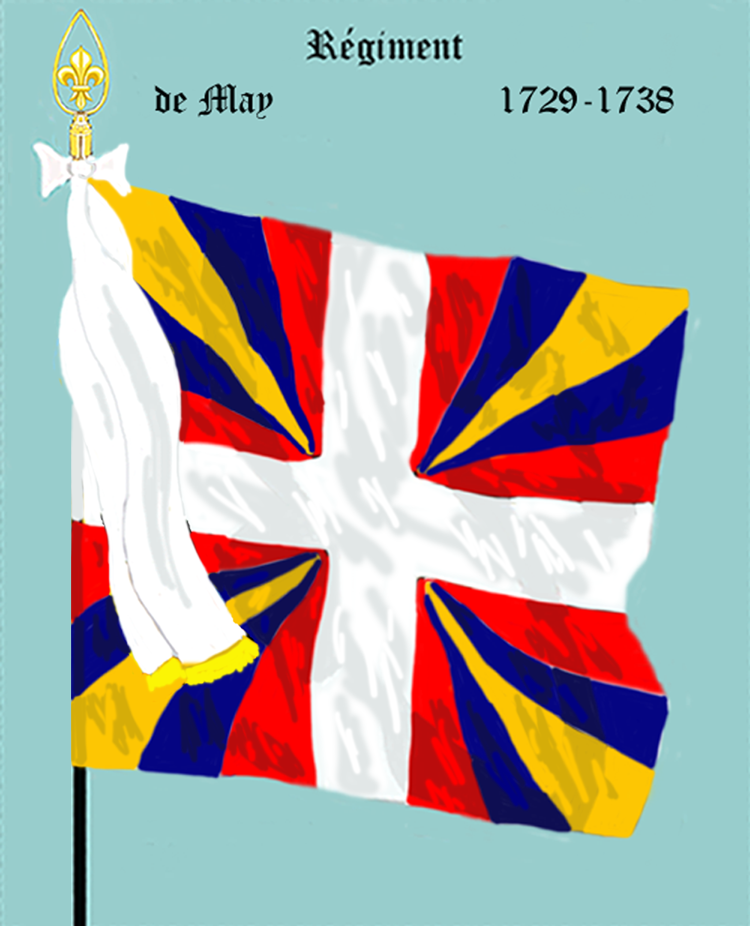
de May

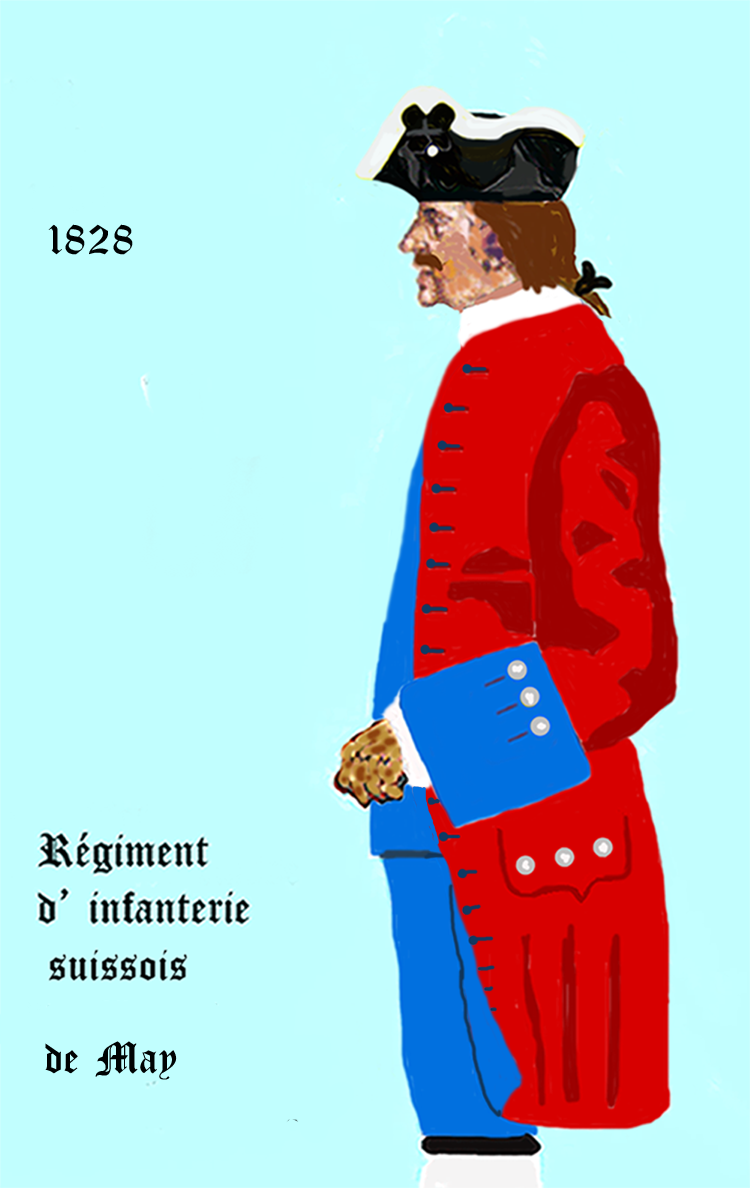
May 1729

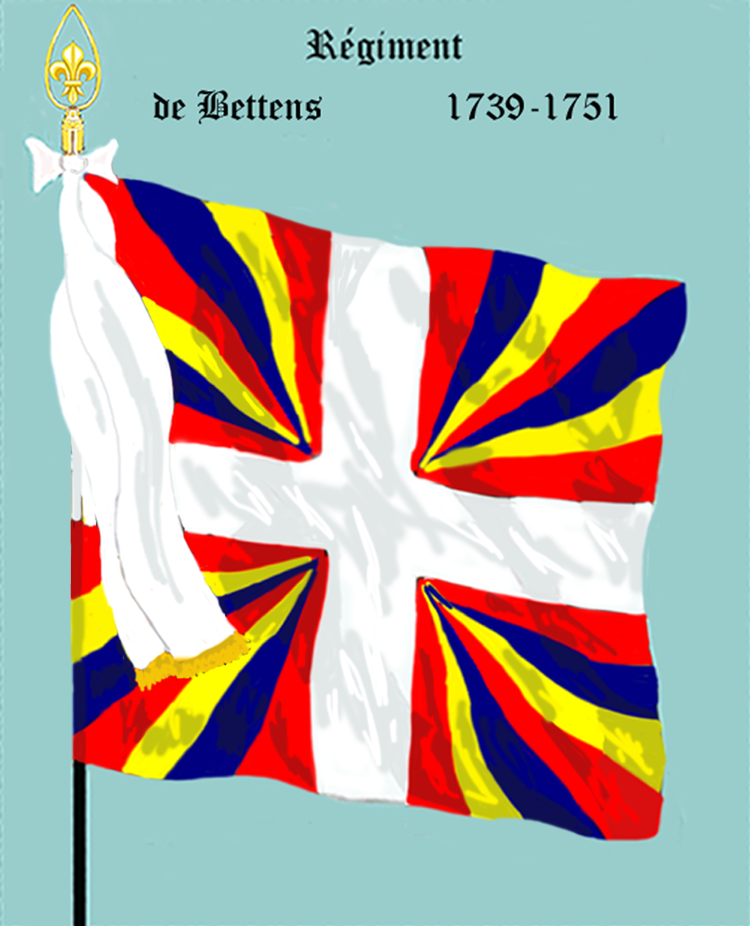
Bettens 1739

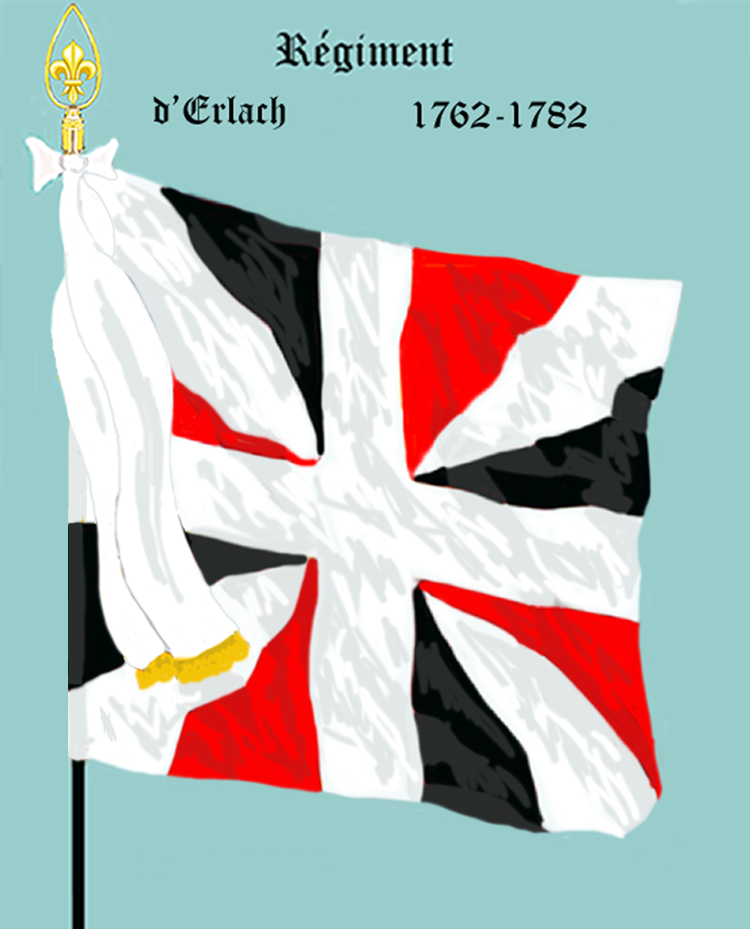
Erlach 1762

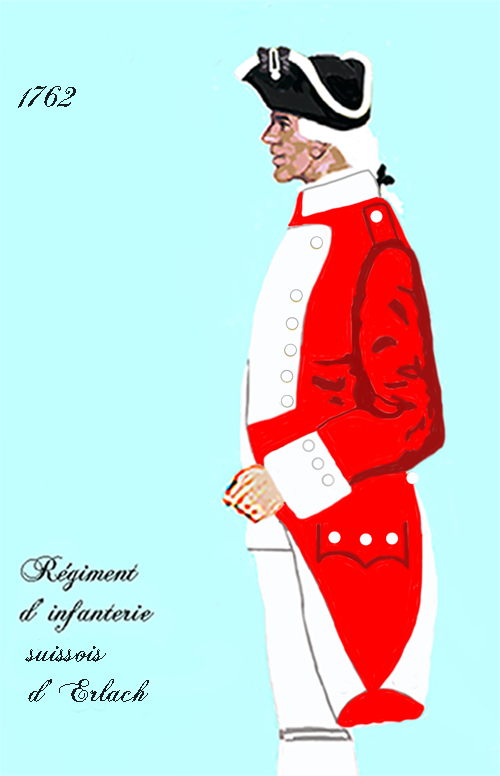
Erlach 1762

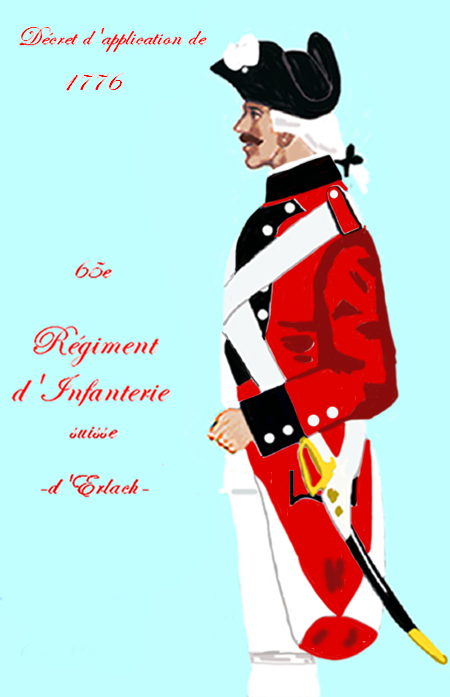
Erlach 1776

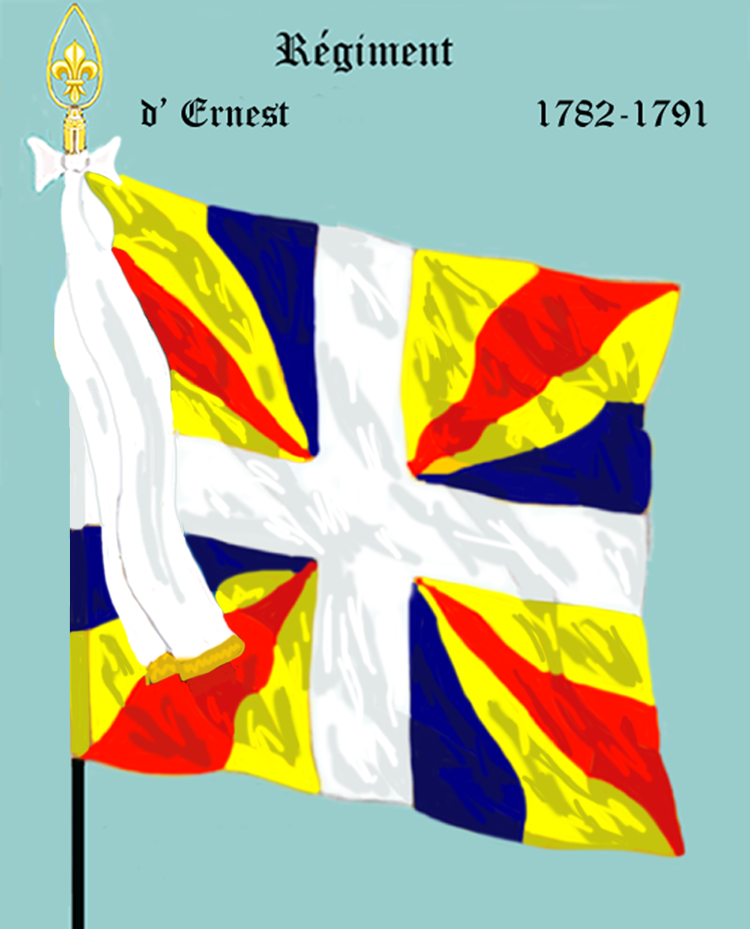
Ernest

Régiment de Stoppa le Vieux
Raised 1672
→ 1701: Régiment de Brendle
→ 1738: Régiment de Seedorf
→ 1752: Régiment de Boccard
→ 1782: Régiment de Salis-Samade
→ 1791: 64ème régiment d’infanterie de ligne

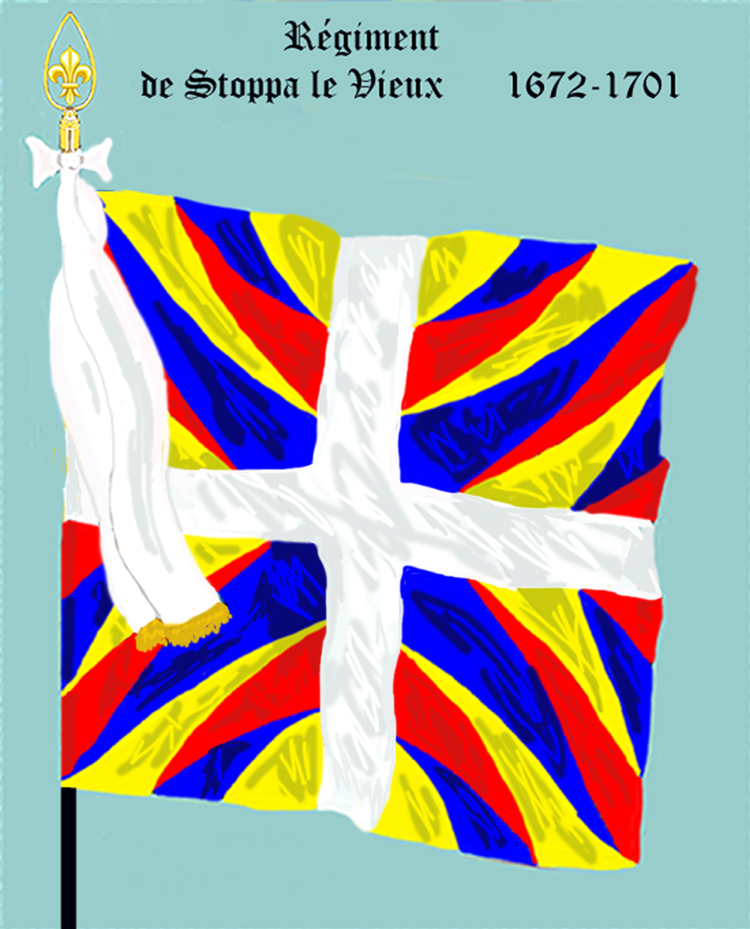
Stoppa le Vieux

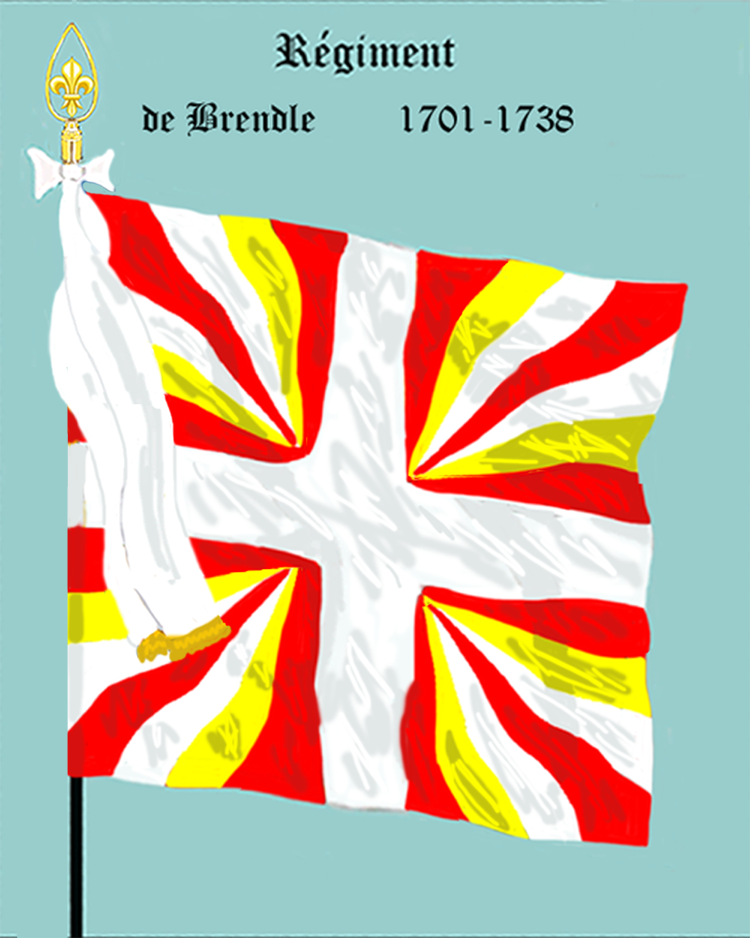
de Brendle

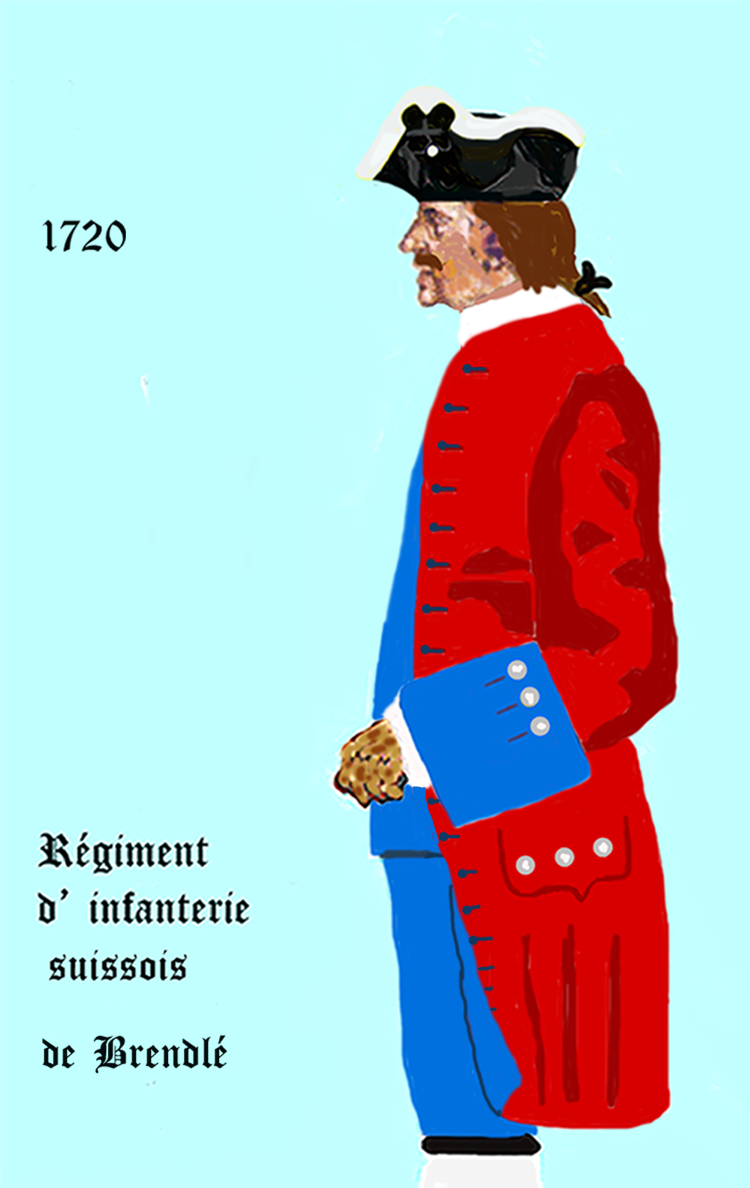
Brendle 1720

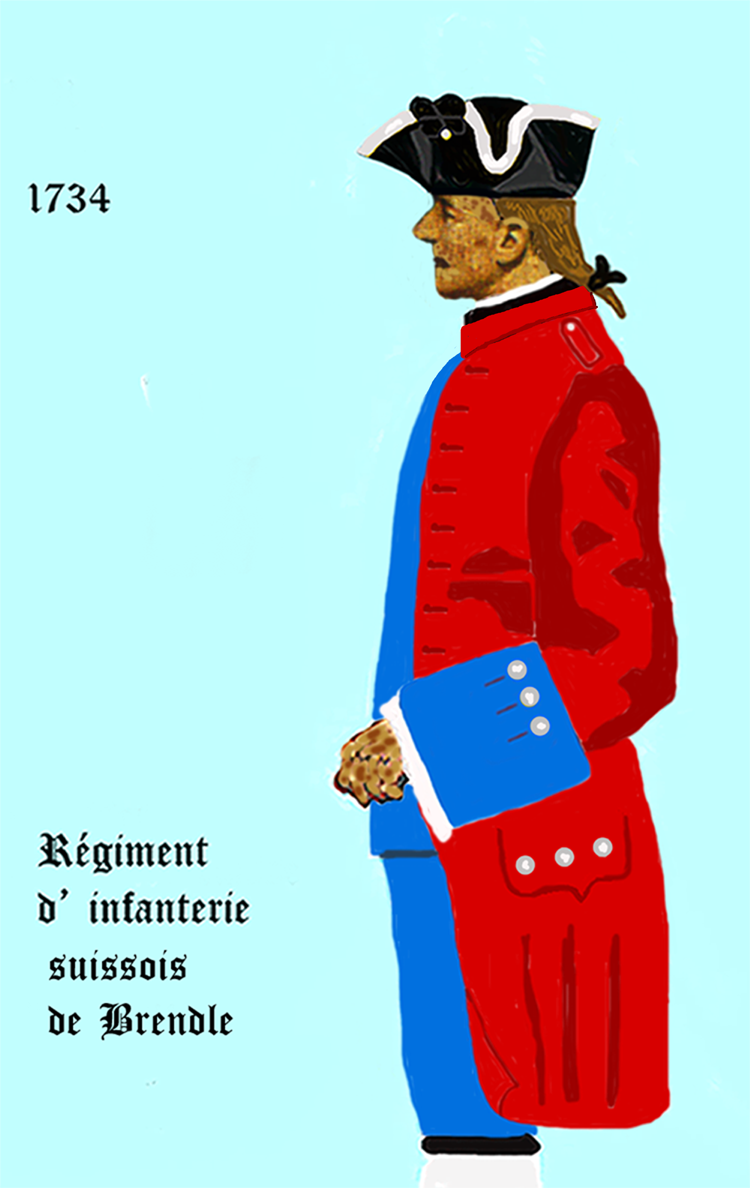
Brendle 1734

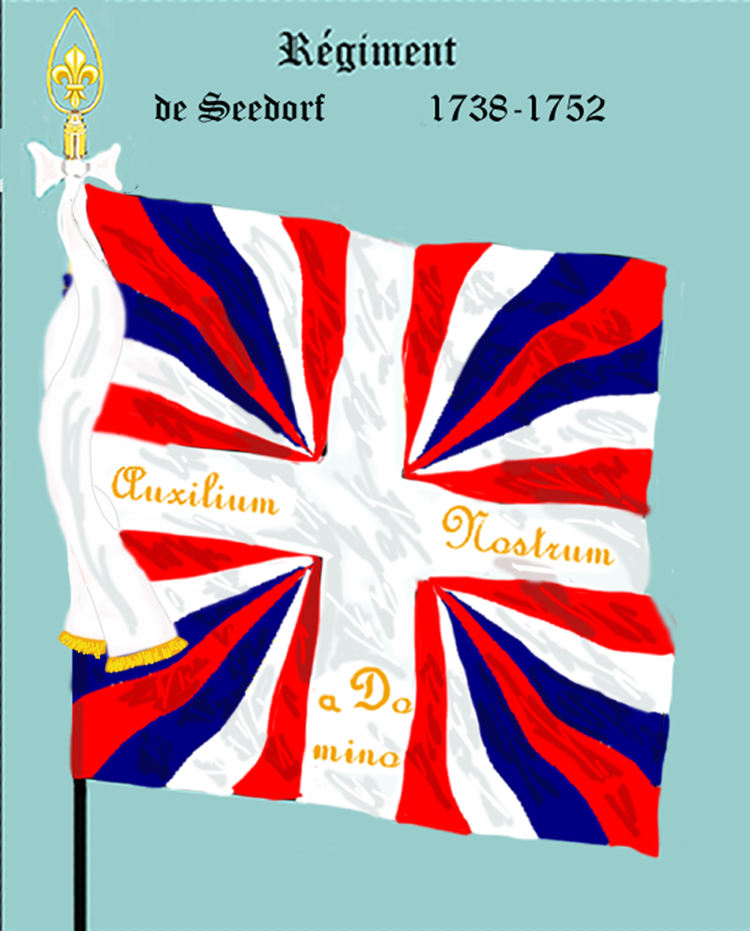
Seedorf

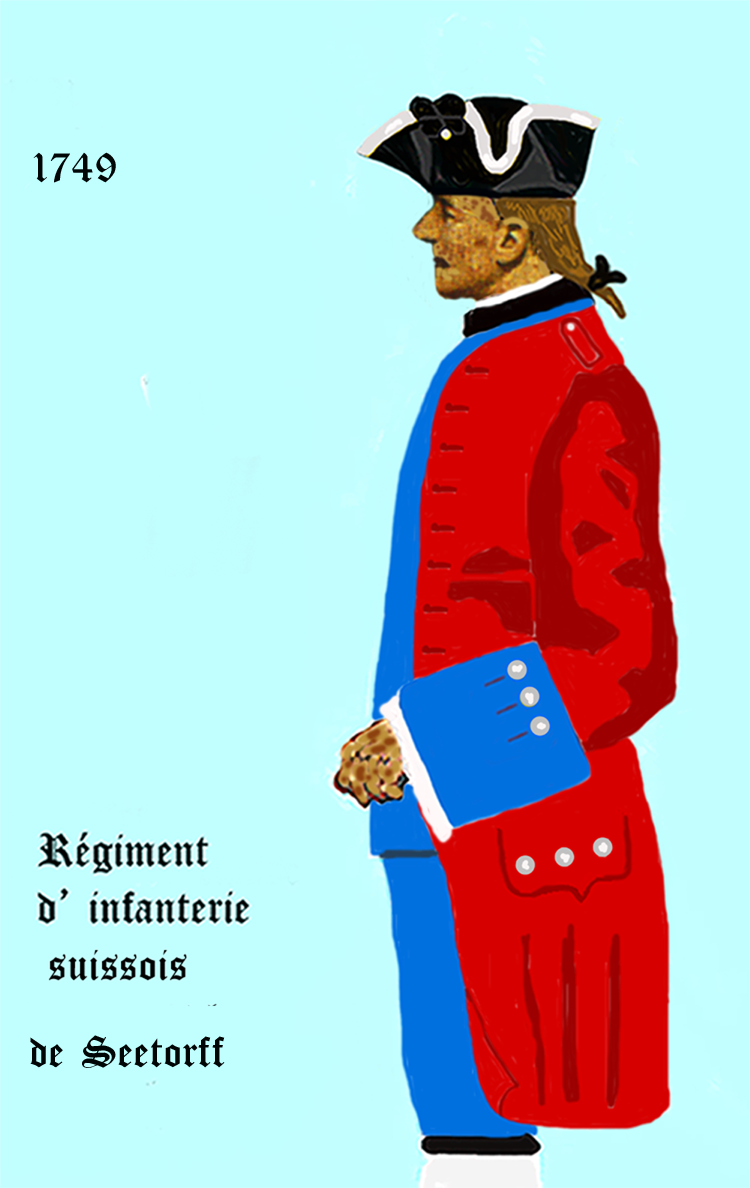
Seedorf 1749

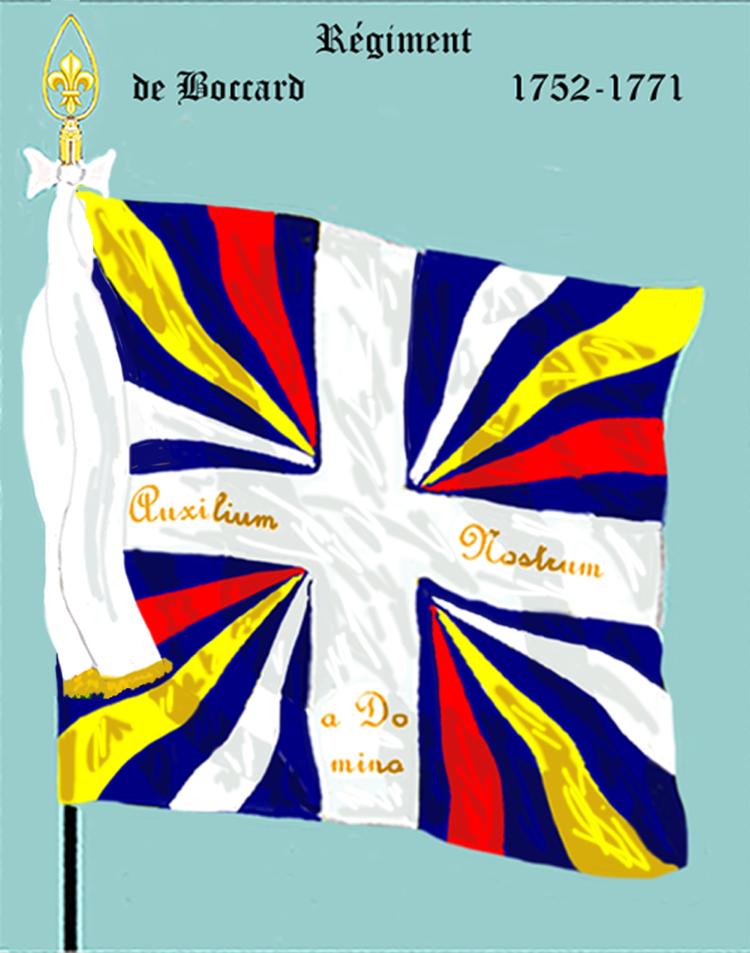
Boccard

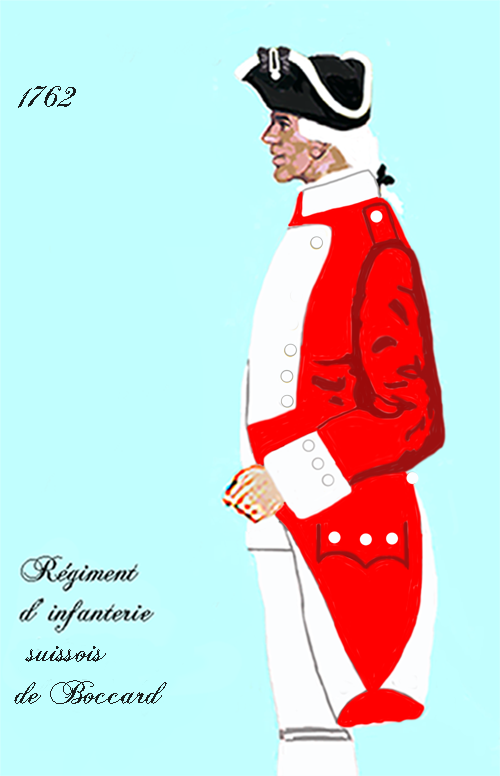
Boccard 1762–1776

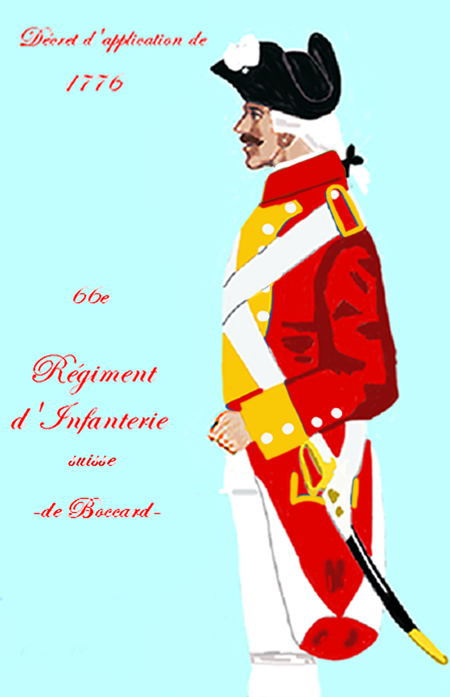
Boccard 1776

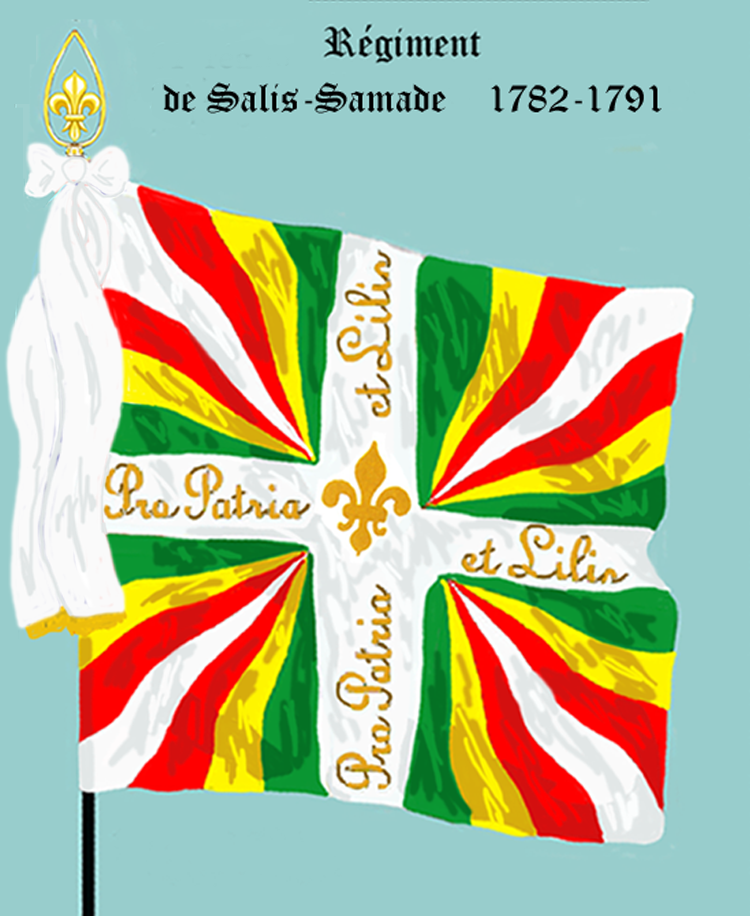
Salis-Samade

Régiment de Salis-Soglio
Raised 1690
→ 1702: Régiment de May
→ 1715: Régiment du Buisson
→ 1721: Régiment de Diesbach
→ 1791: 85ème régiment d’infanterie de ligne

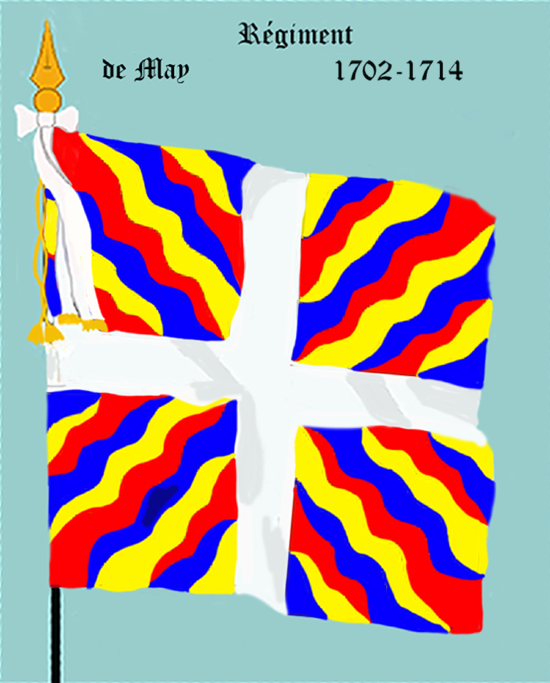
de May

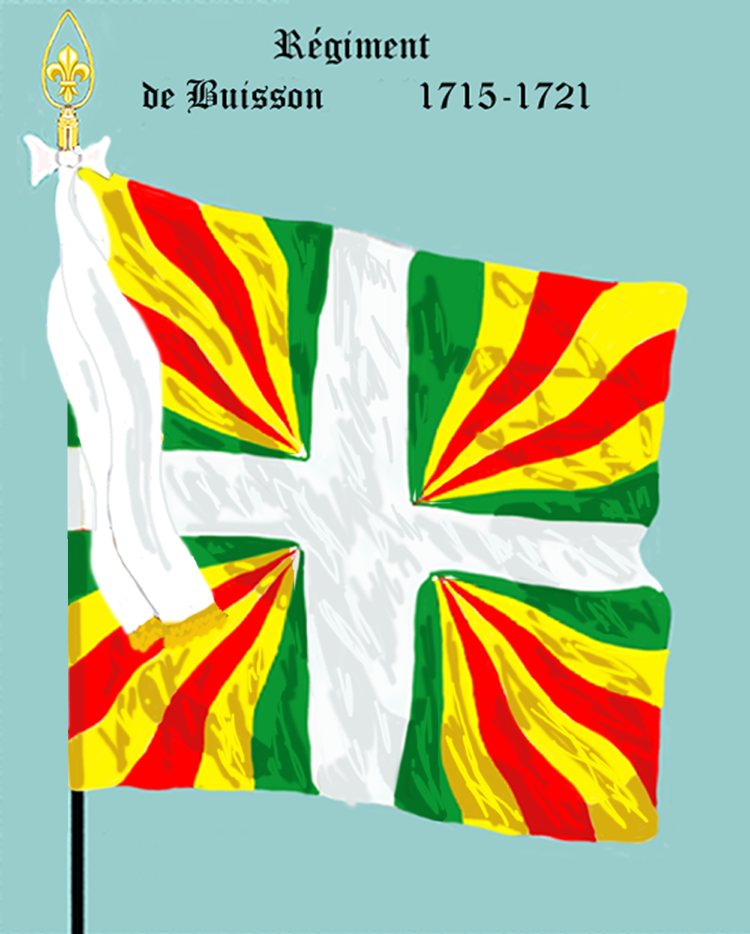
de Buisson

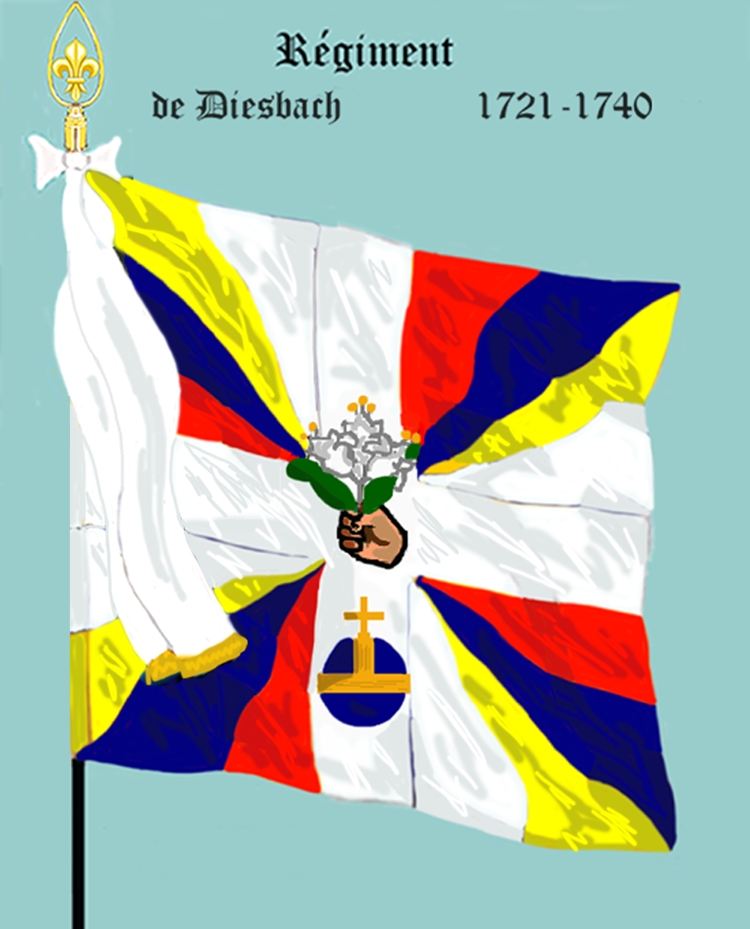
de Diesbach 1721–1740

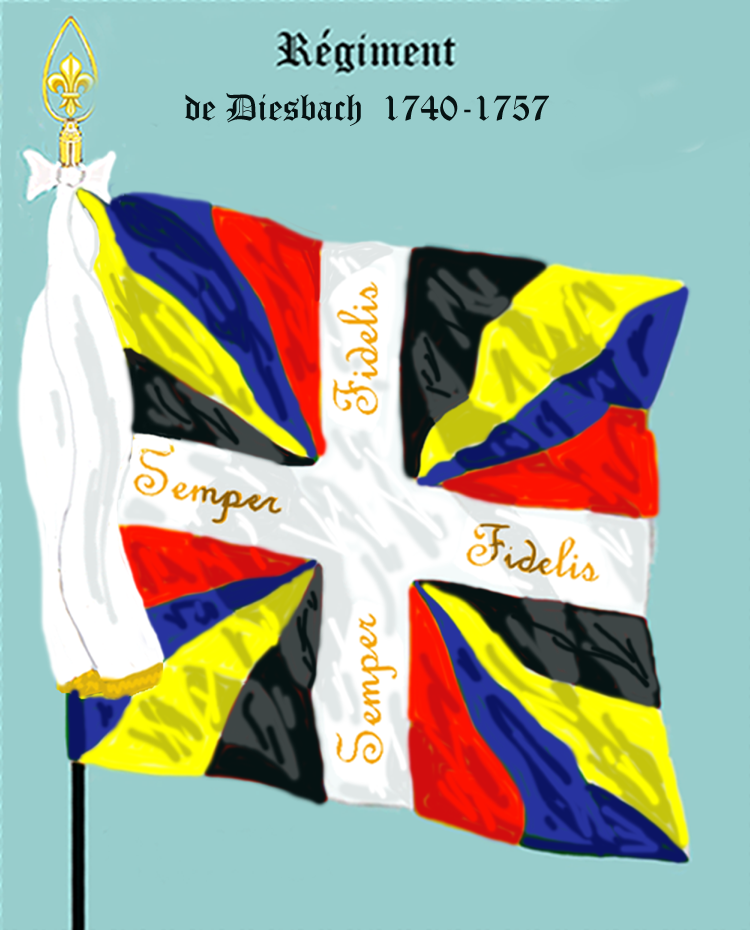
Rég de Diesbach 1740–1757

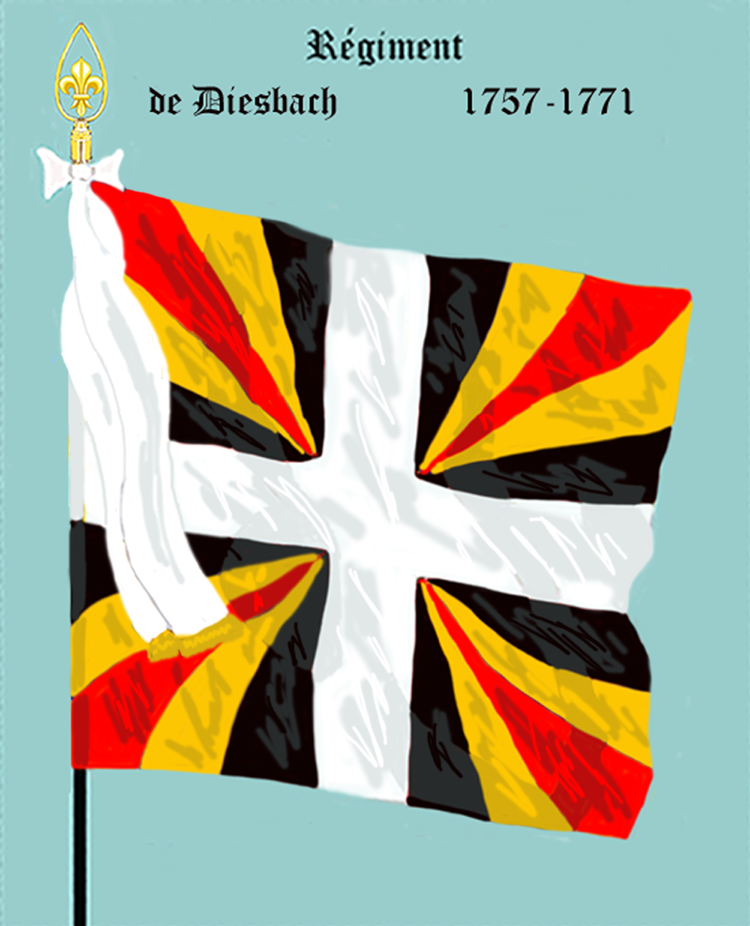
Rég de Diesbach 1757–1771

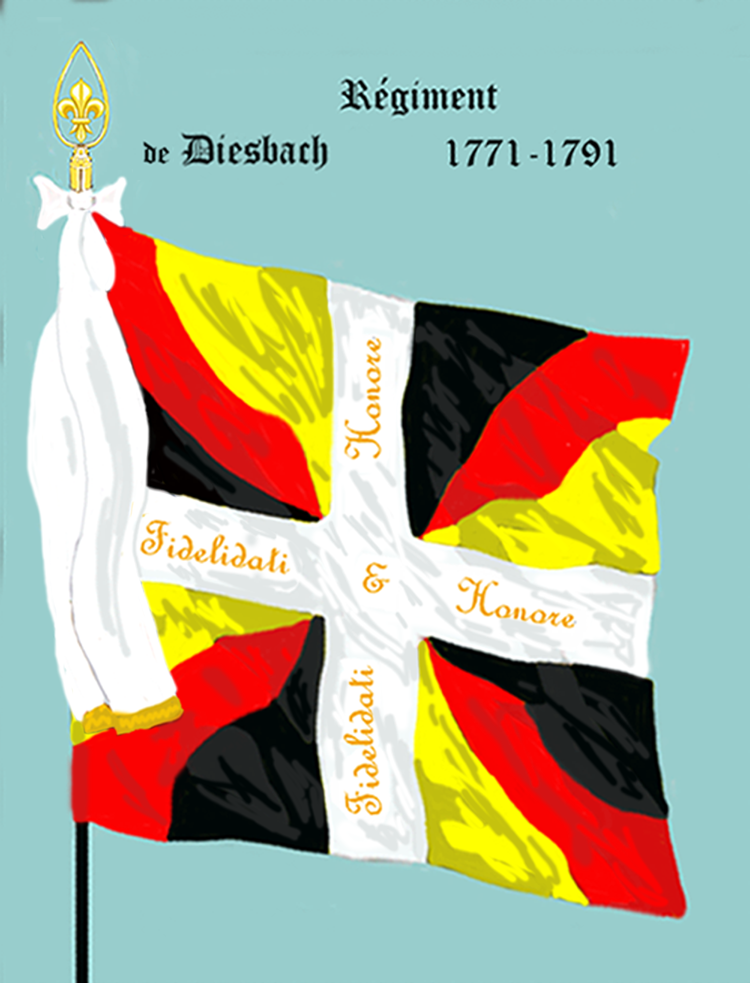
de Diesbach 1771–1791

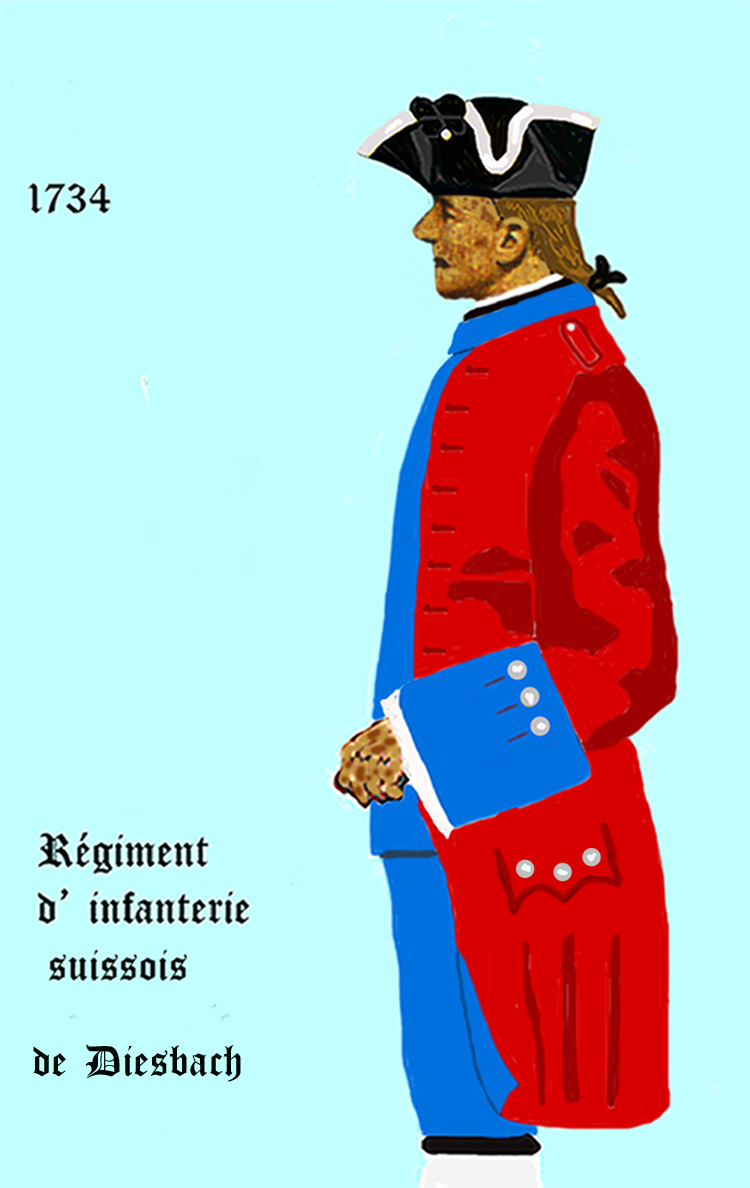
de Diesbach 1734

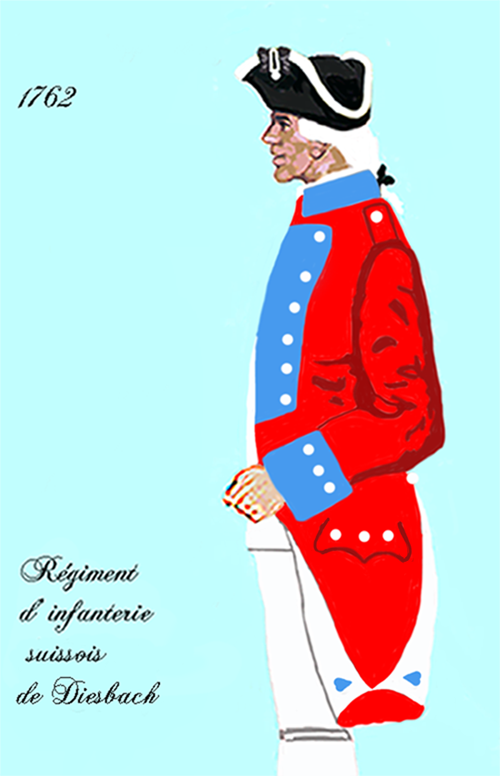
de Diesbach 1762

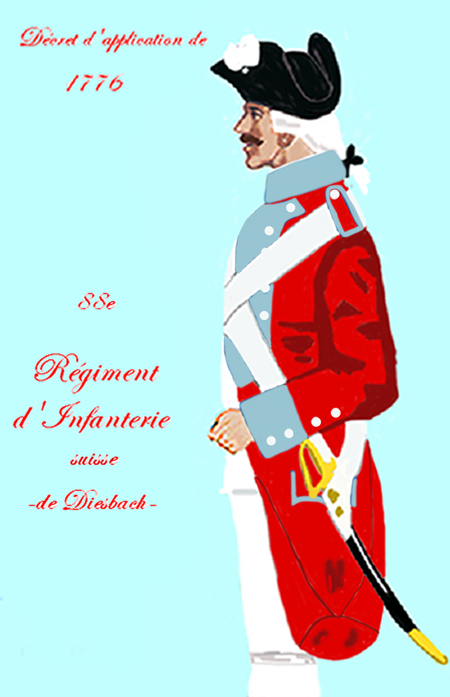
de Diesbach 1771

Régiment de Pfyffer
Raised 1672
→ 1689: Régiment d’Hessy
→ 1729: Régiment de Burky
→ 1737: Régiment de Tschudy
→ 1740: Régiment de Vigier
→ 1756: Régiment de Castellas
→ 1791: 66ème régiment d’infanterie de ligne

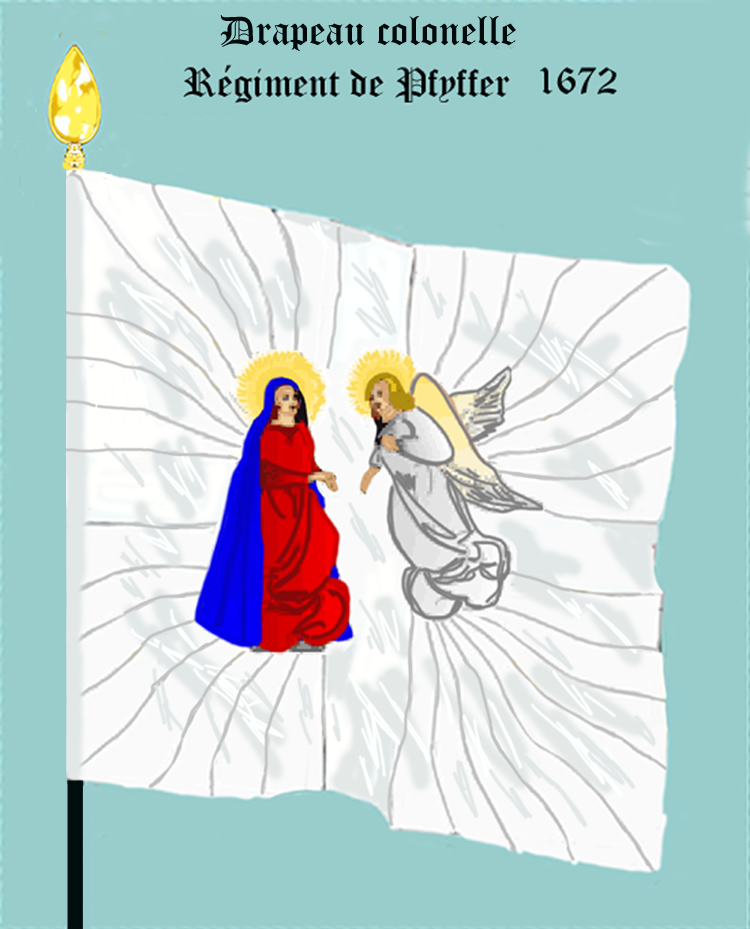
Colonel 1672 - 1689 (obverse)

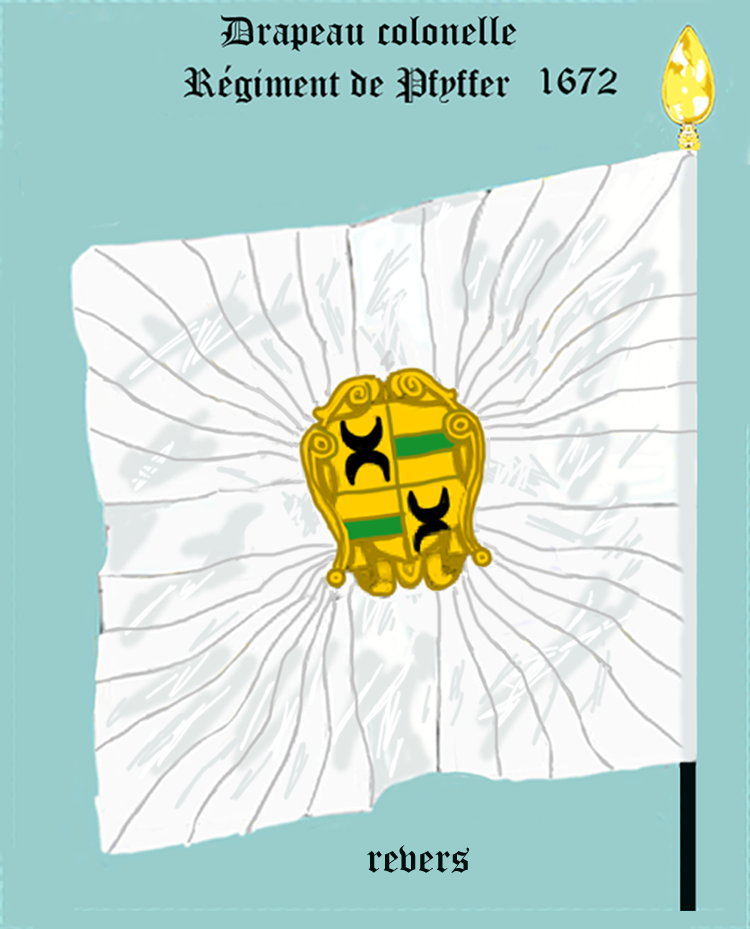
Colonel 1672 - 1689 (reverse)

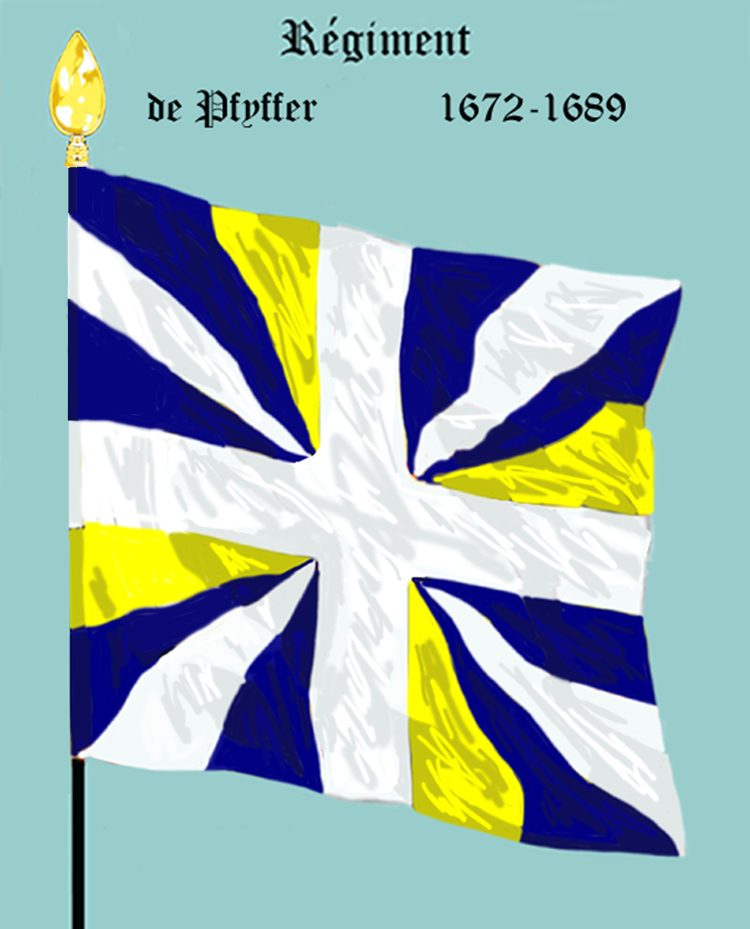
Pfyffer

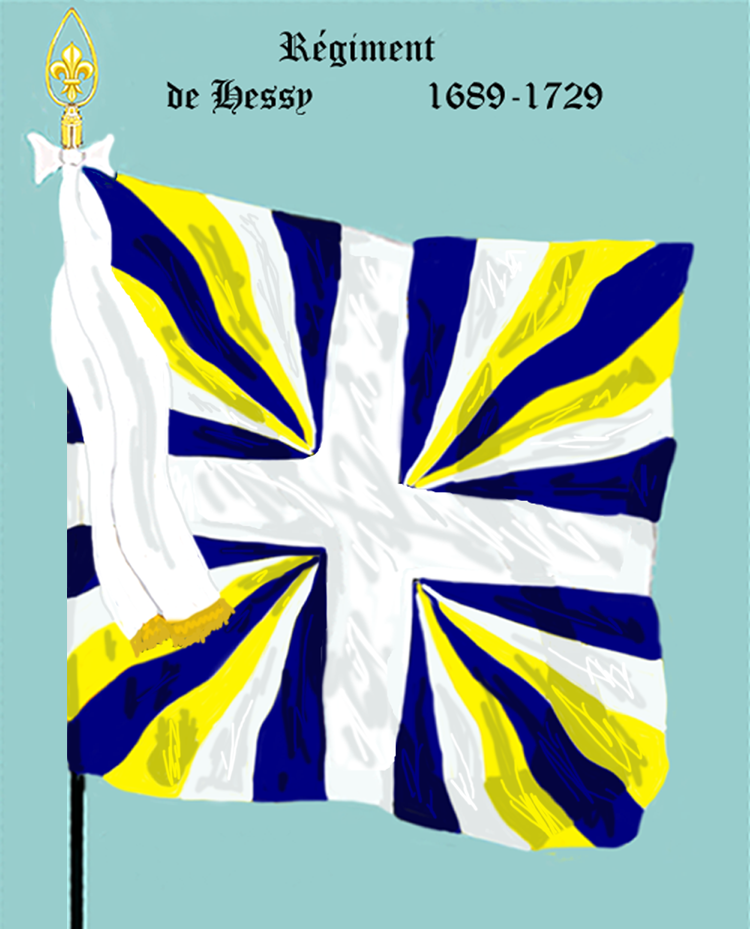
Hessy

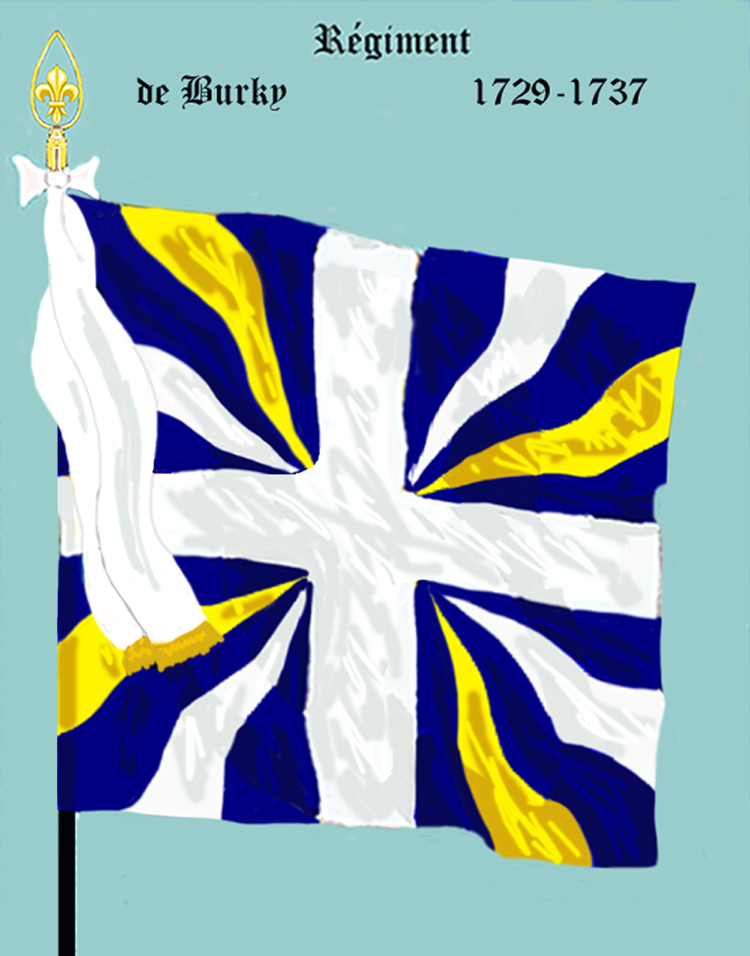
Burky

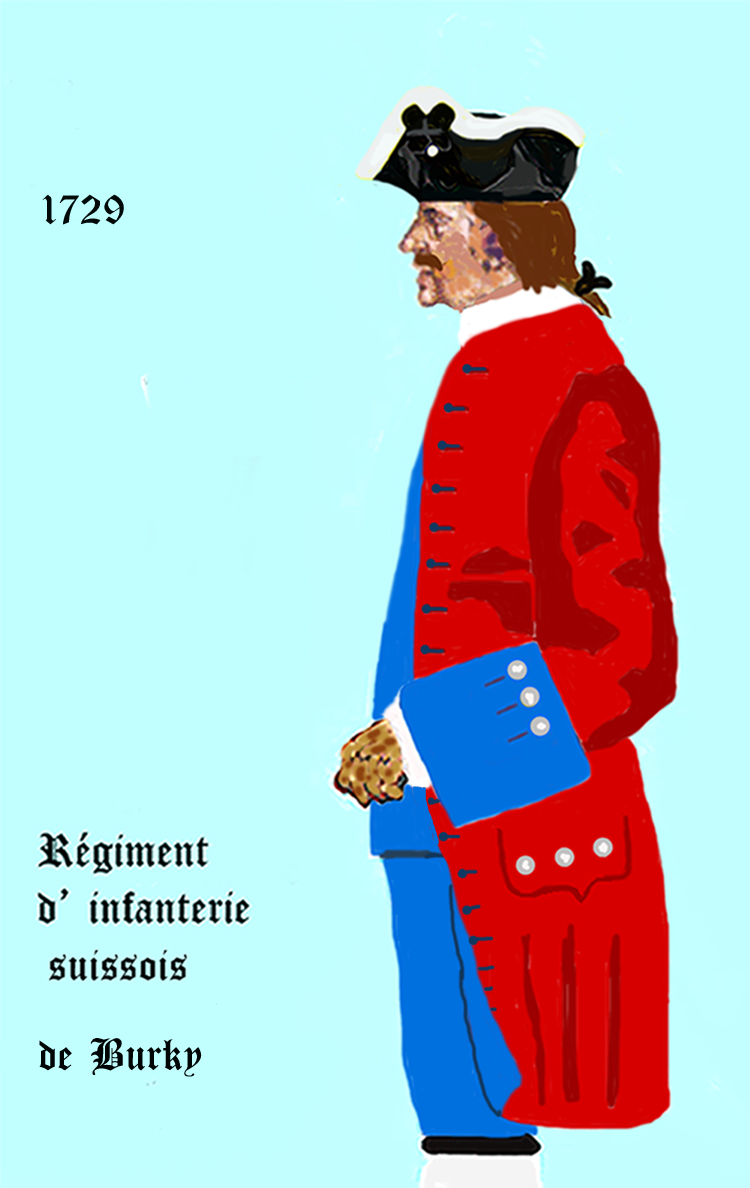
Burky 1729

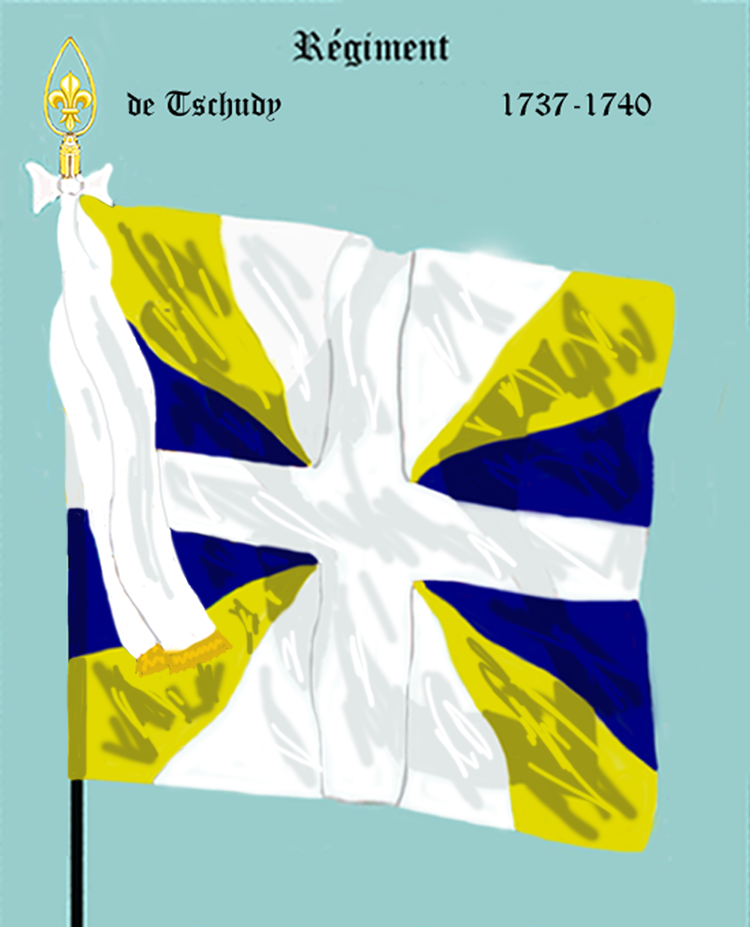
Tschudy

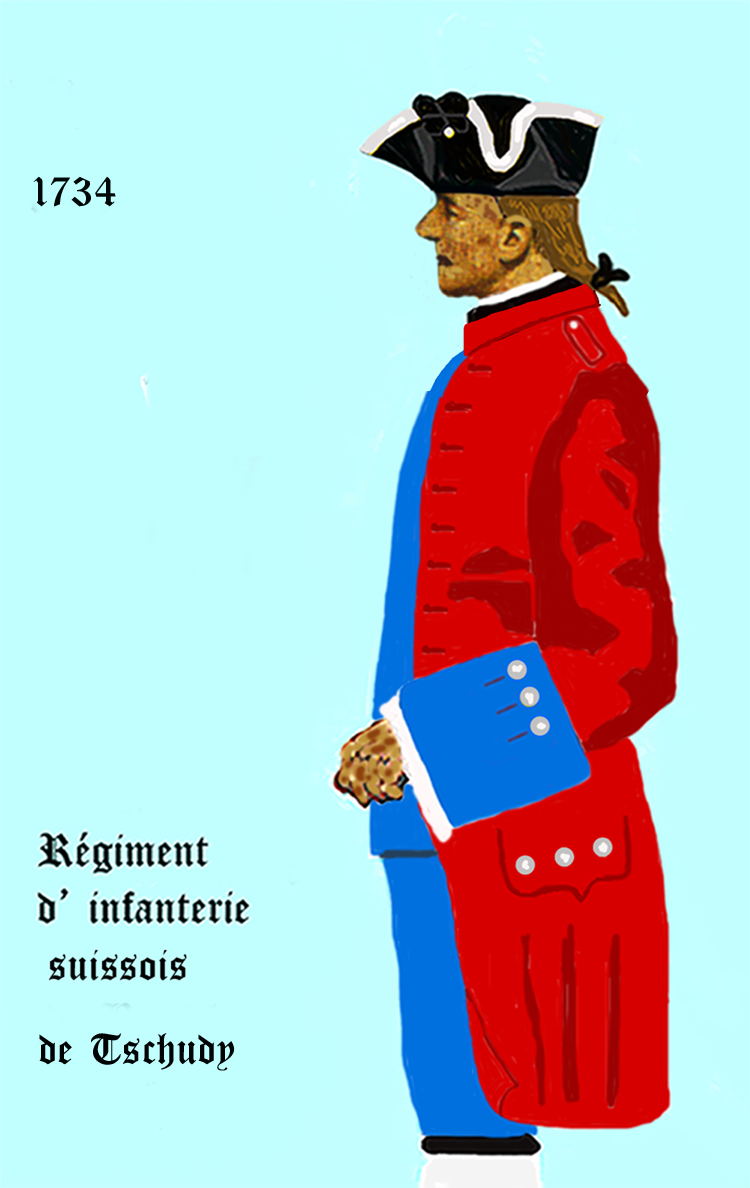
Tschudy 1734

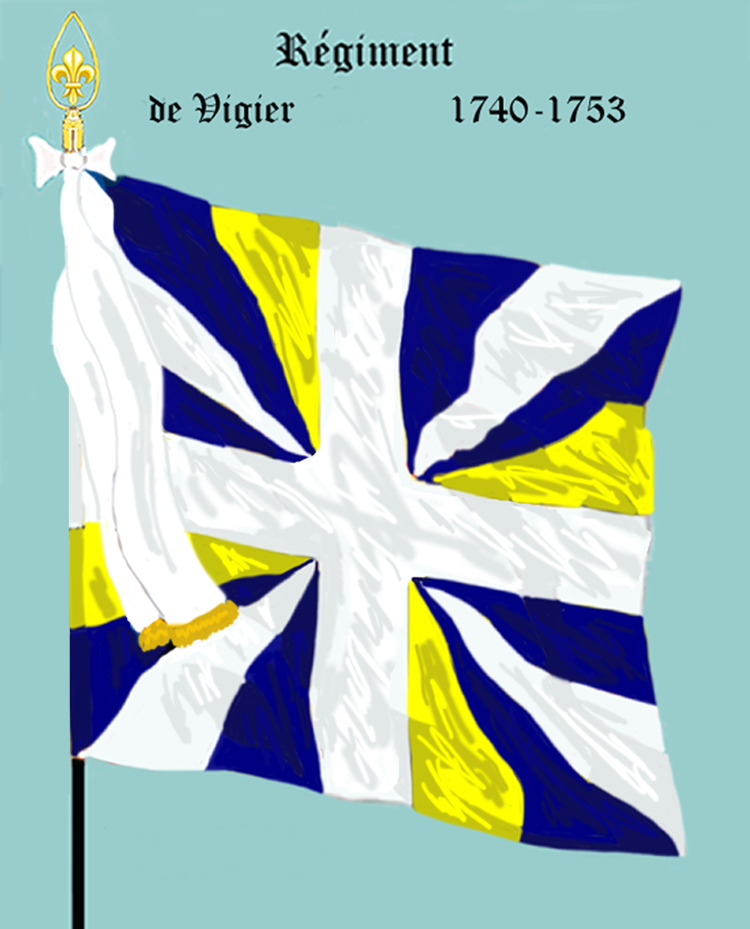
Vigier 1740–1743

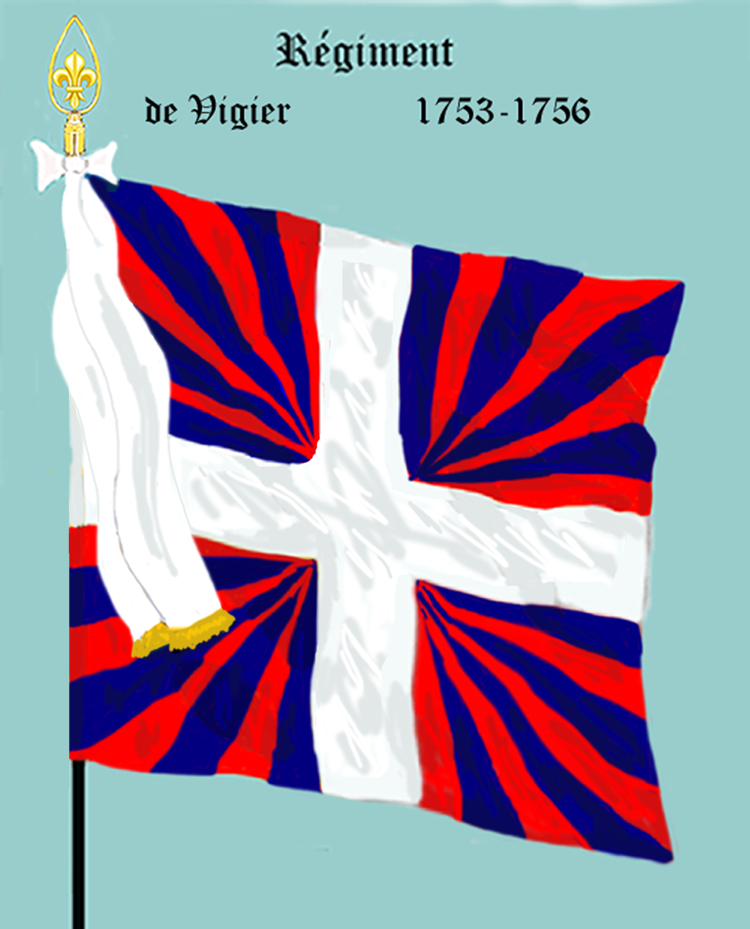
Vigier 1753–1756

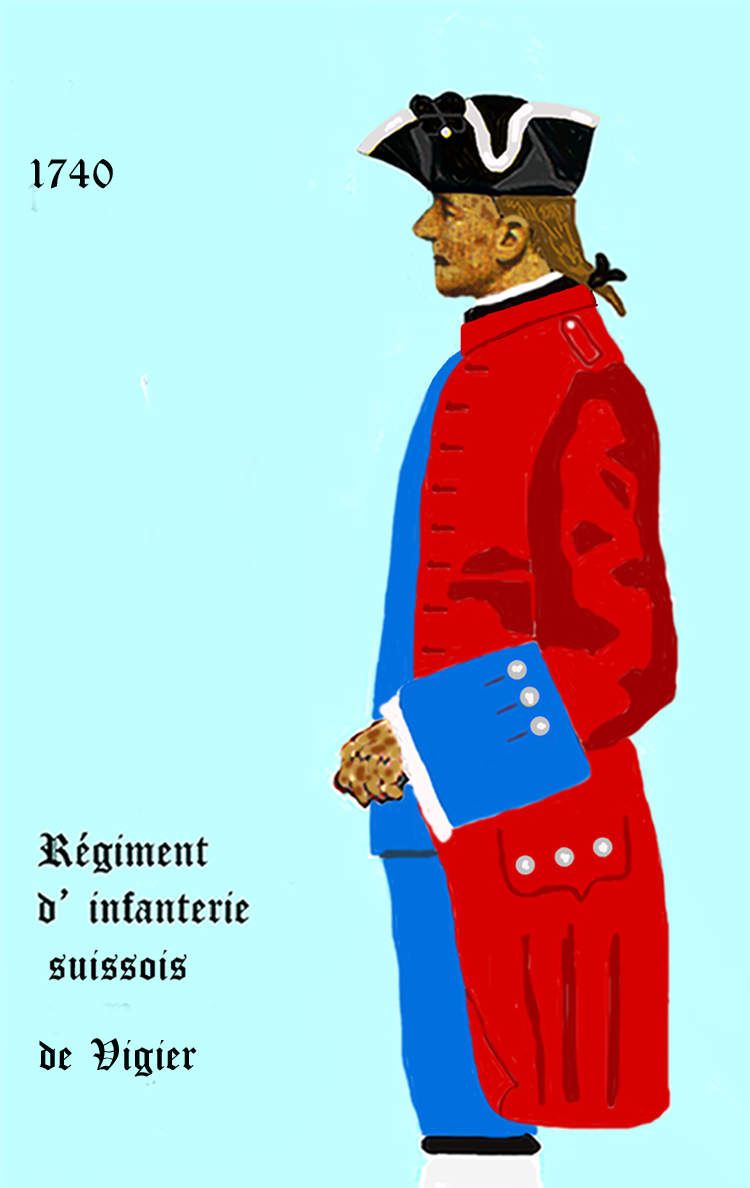
Vigier 1740

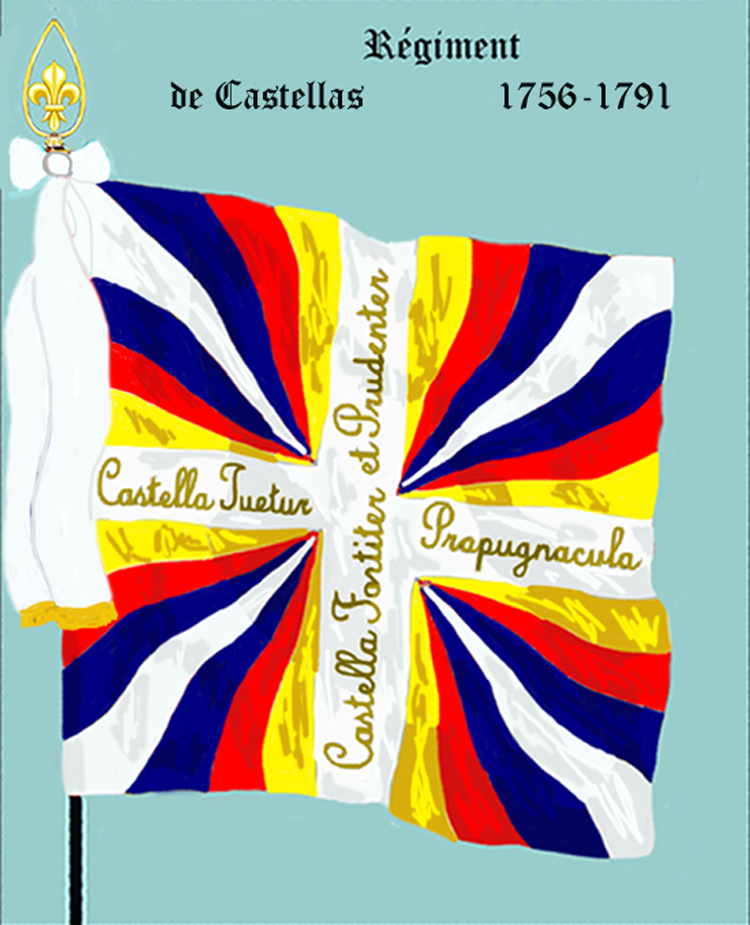
Castellas

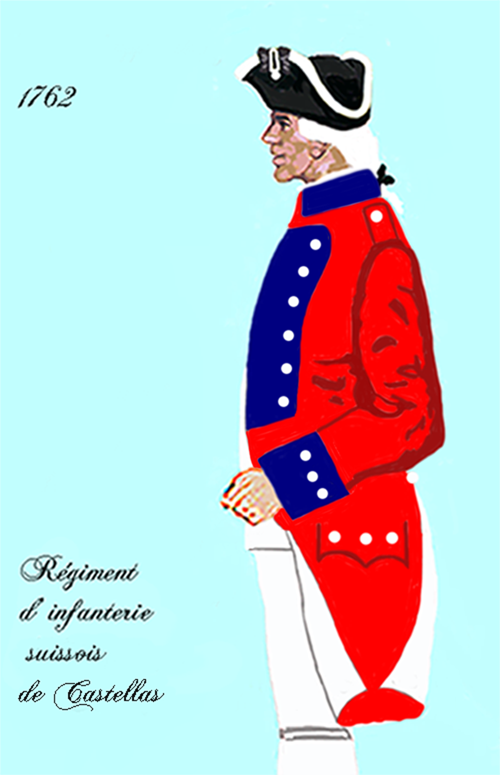
Castellas 1762

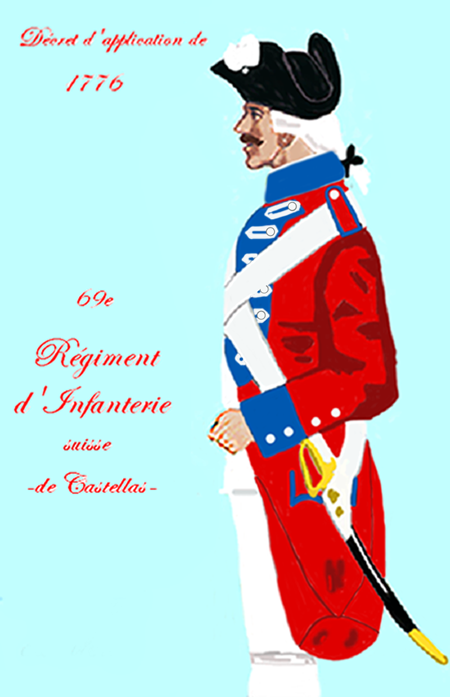
Castellas 1776

Régiment de Courten
Raised 1690
→ 1791: 86ème régiment d’infanterie de ligne

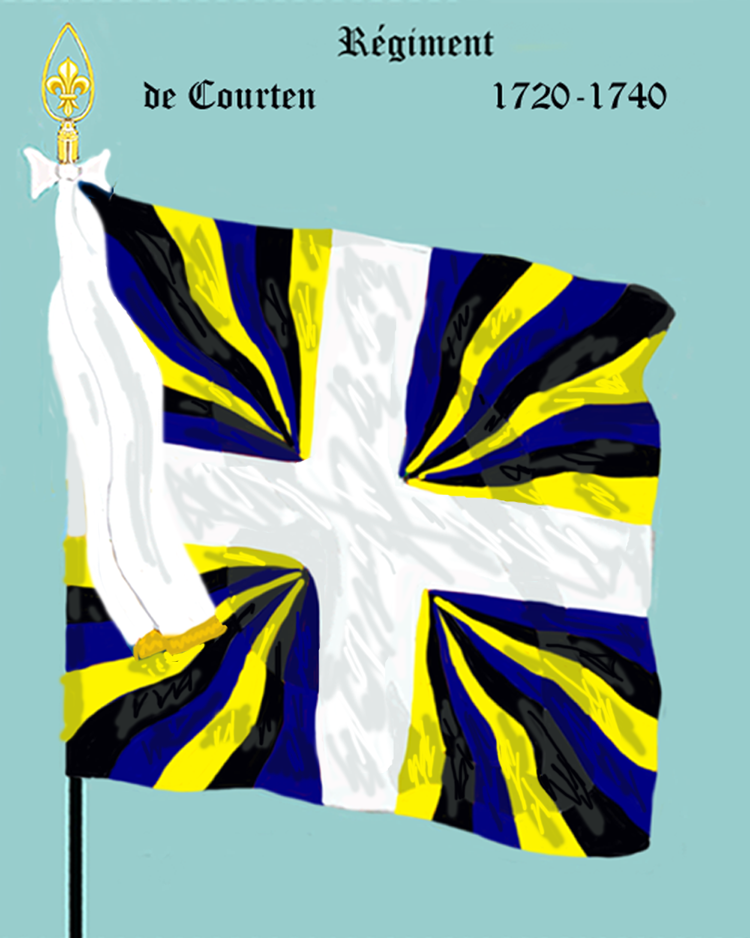
de Courten 1720–1740

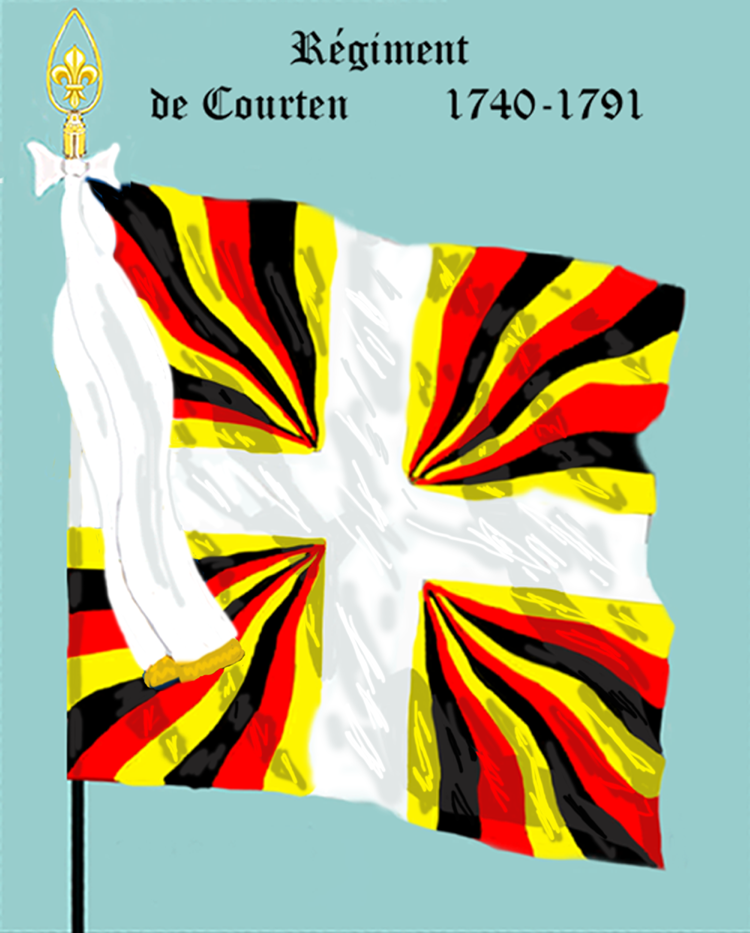
Courten

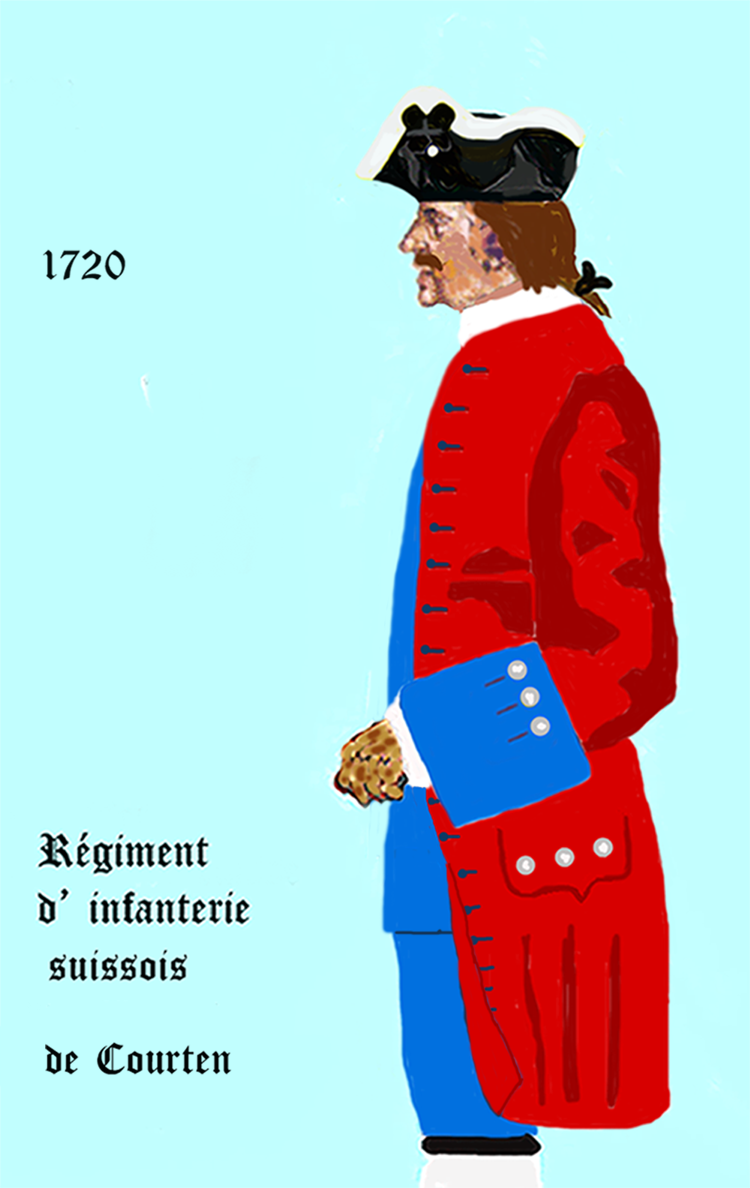
Courten 1720

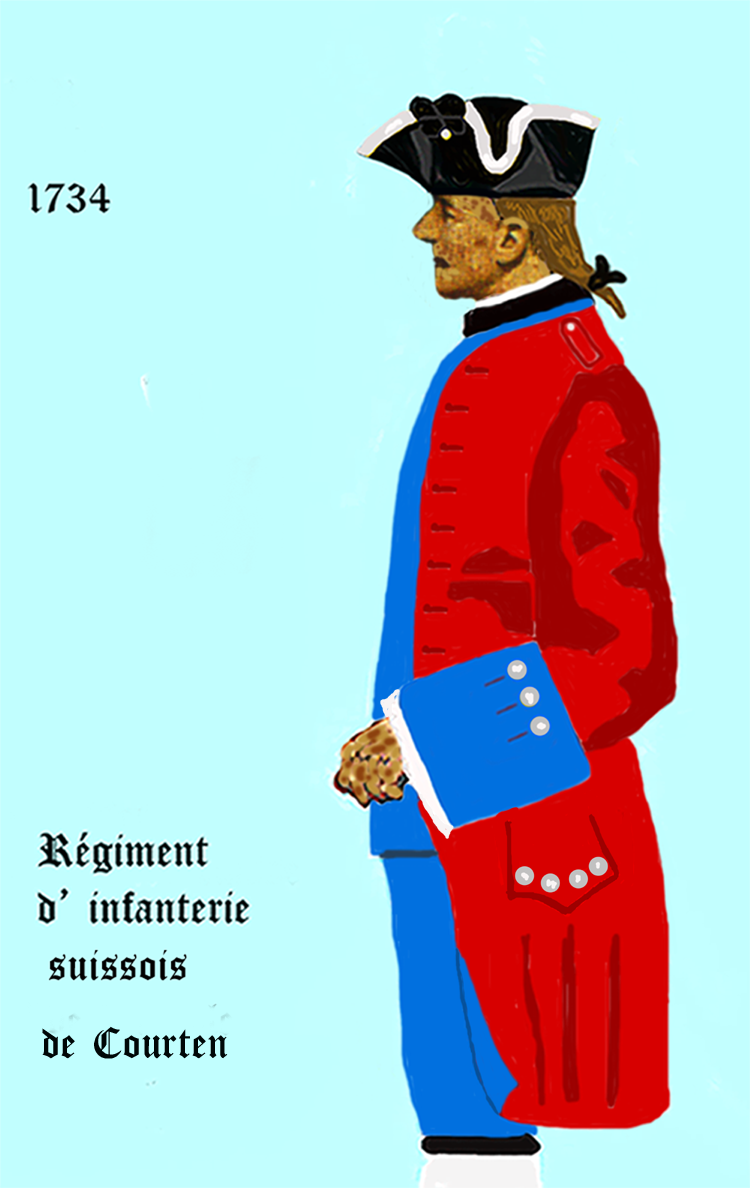
Courten 1734

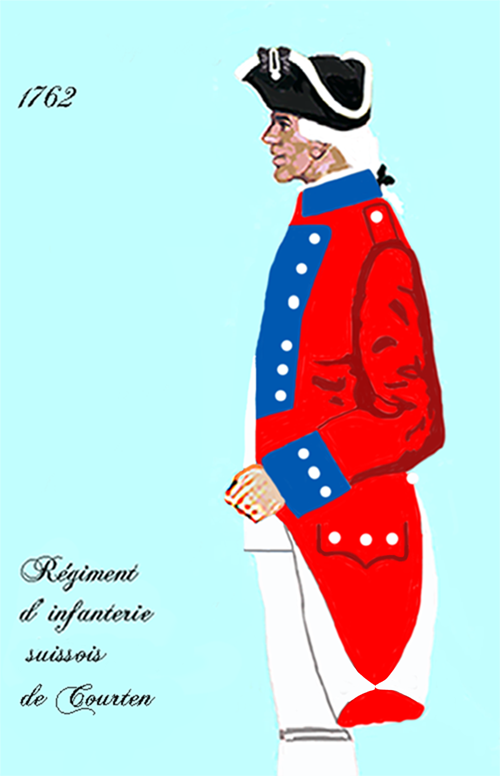
Courten 1762

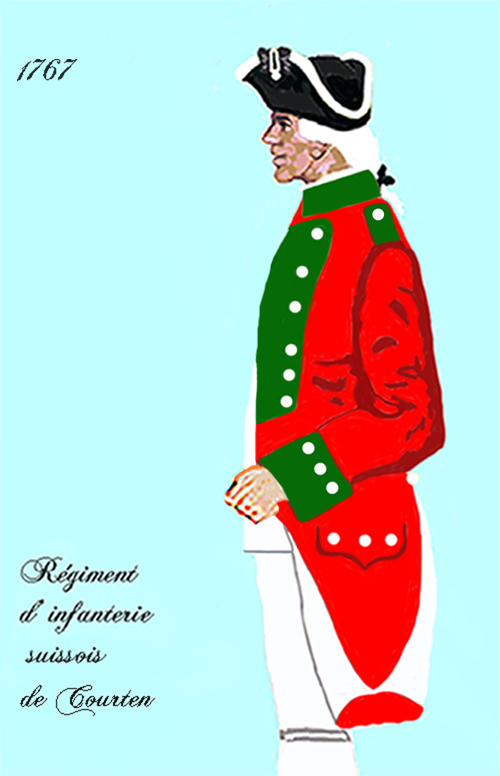
Courten 1767

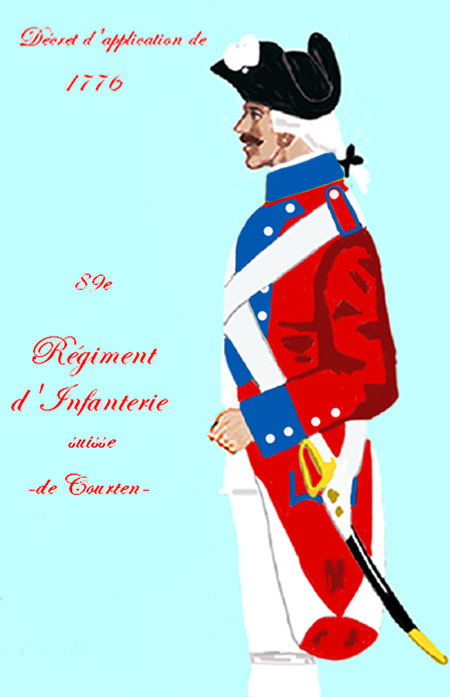
Courten 1776

Régiment d’Eptingen
Raised 1758
→ 1783: Régiment de Schönau (Schonau)
→ 1786: Régiment de Reinach
→ 1791: 100ème regiment d’infanterie de ligne

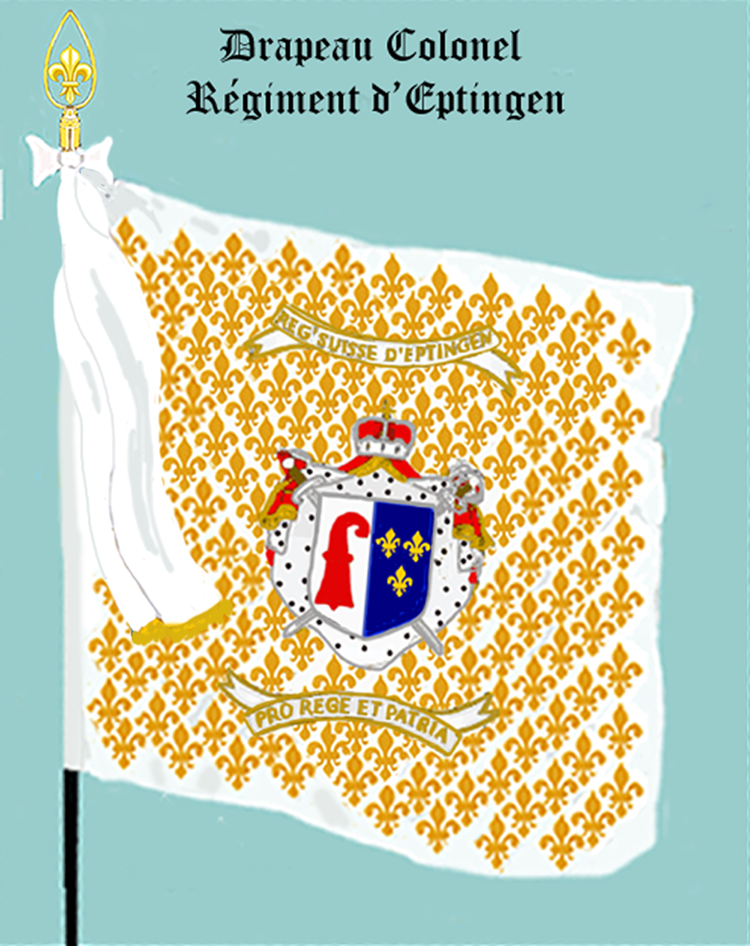
Colonel 1758-1783

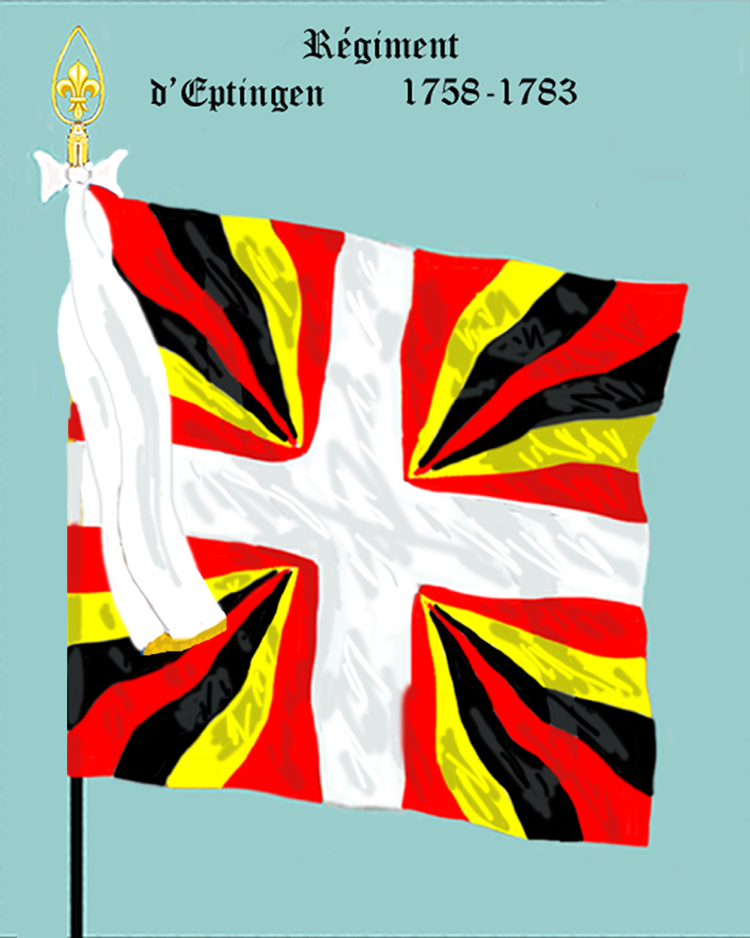
d'Eptingen

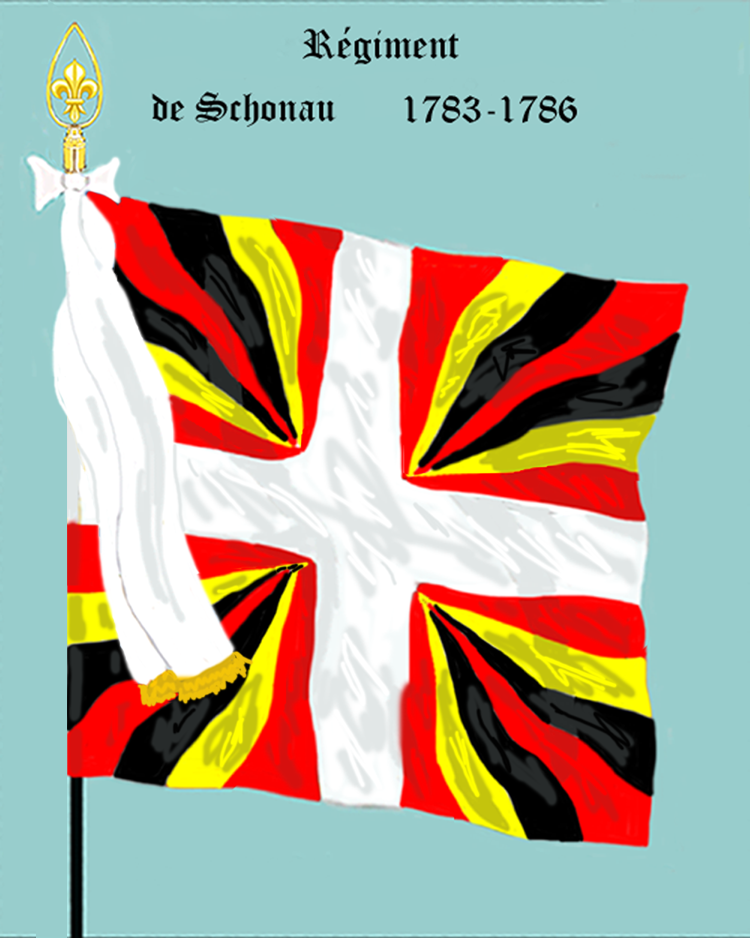
de Schönau (Schonau)

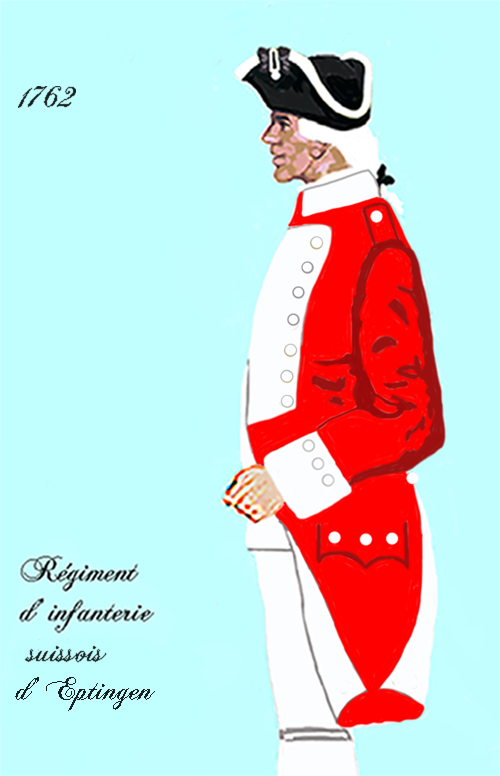
Eptingen 1762

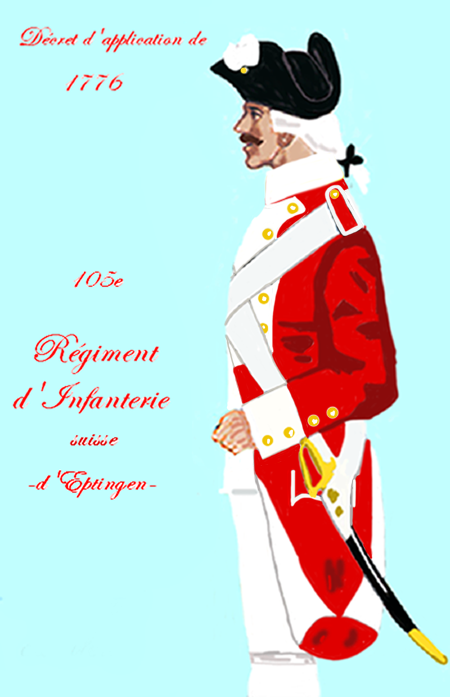
Eptingen 1776

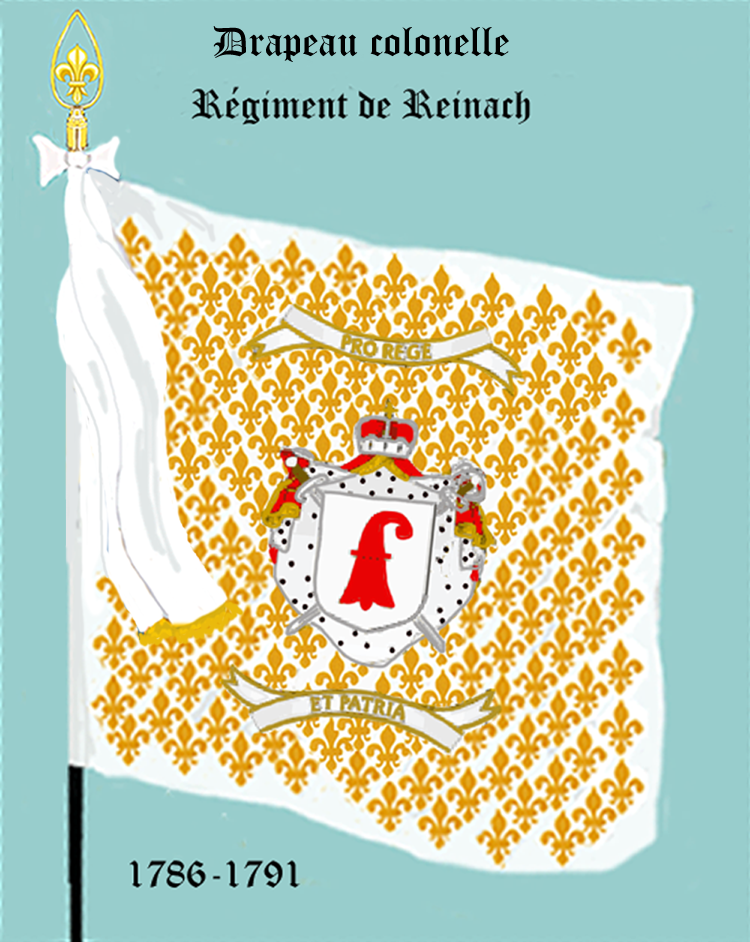
Colonel 1786–1791

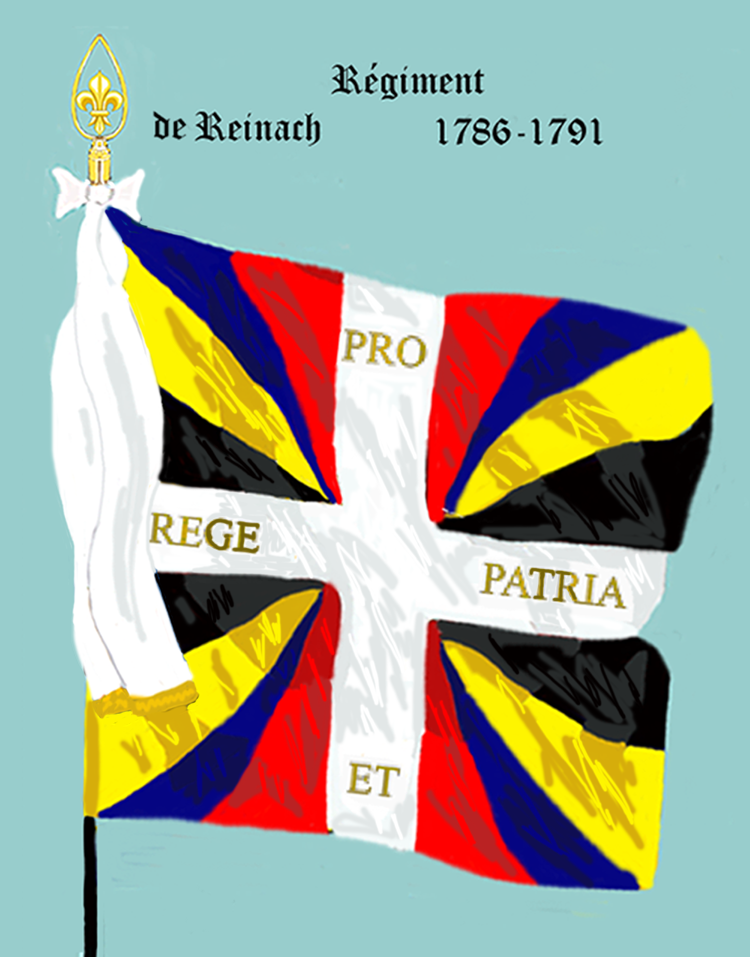
Reinach

Régiment de Karrer
Raised 1719
→ 1752: Régiment de Hallwyl
→ 1763 Merged with Régiment de Béarn (French regiment)

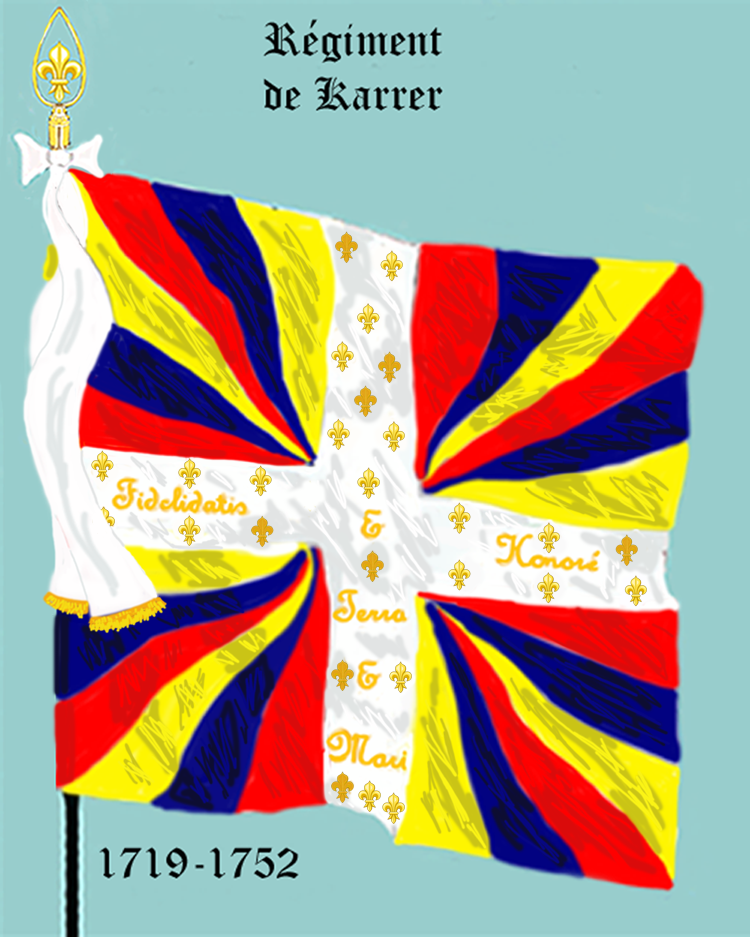
Karrer

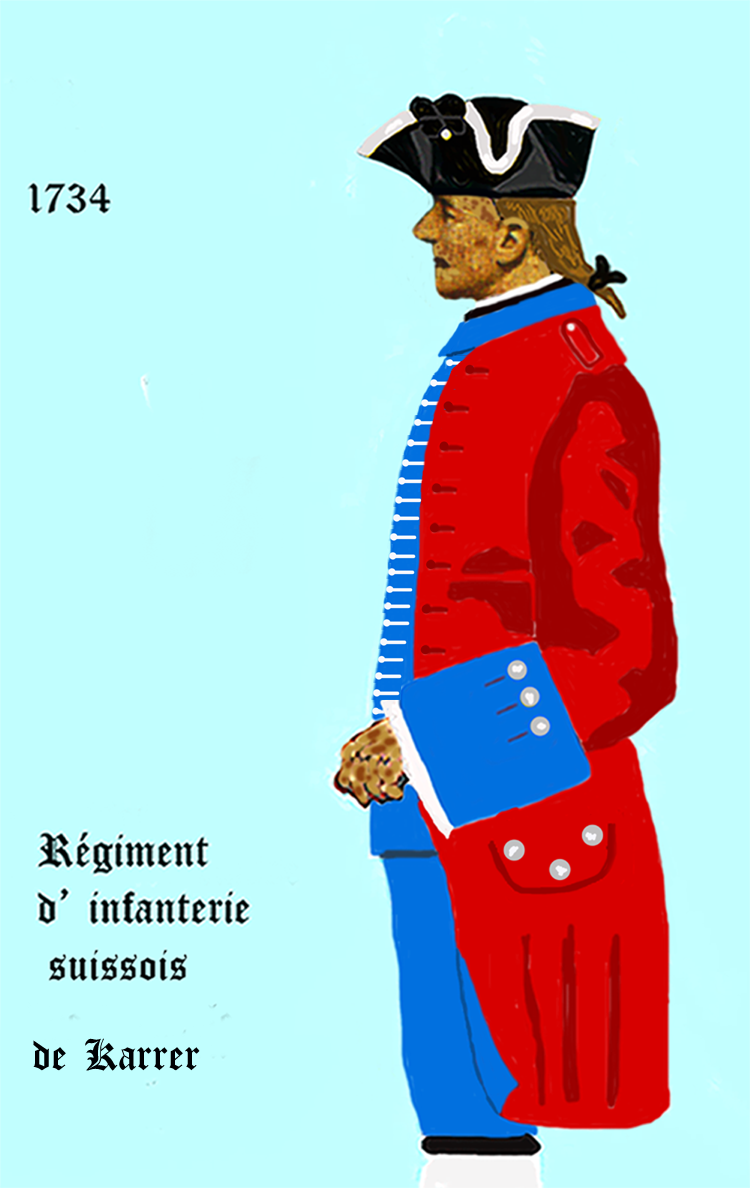
Karrer 1734

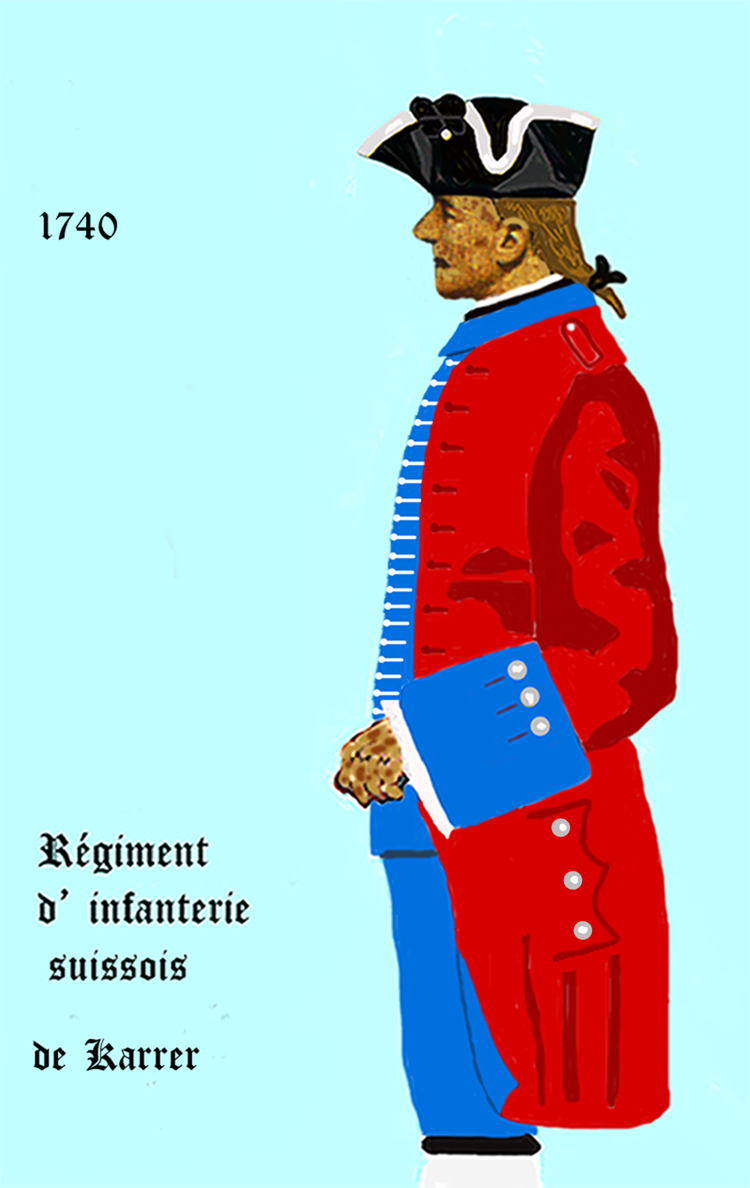
Karrer 1740

Régiment de Lochmann
Raised 1758
→ 1777: Régiment de Muralt
→ 1782: Régiment de Steiner
→ 1791: 97ème régiment d’infanterie de ligne

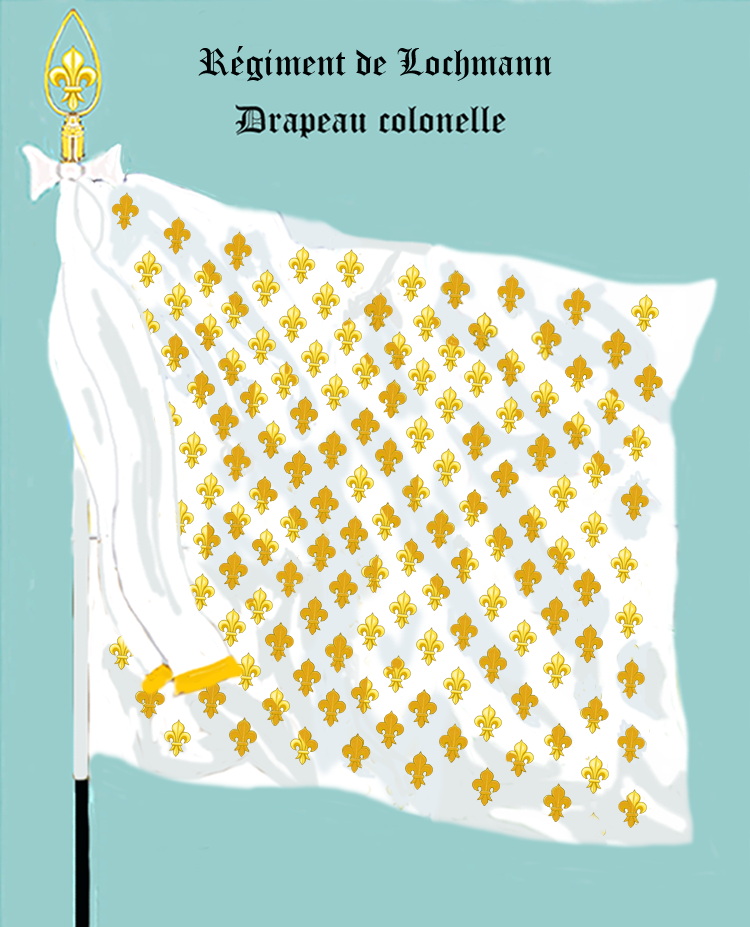
Colonel 1751–1777

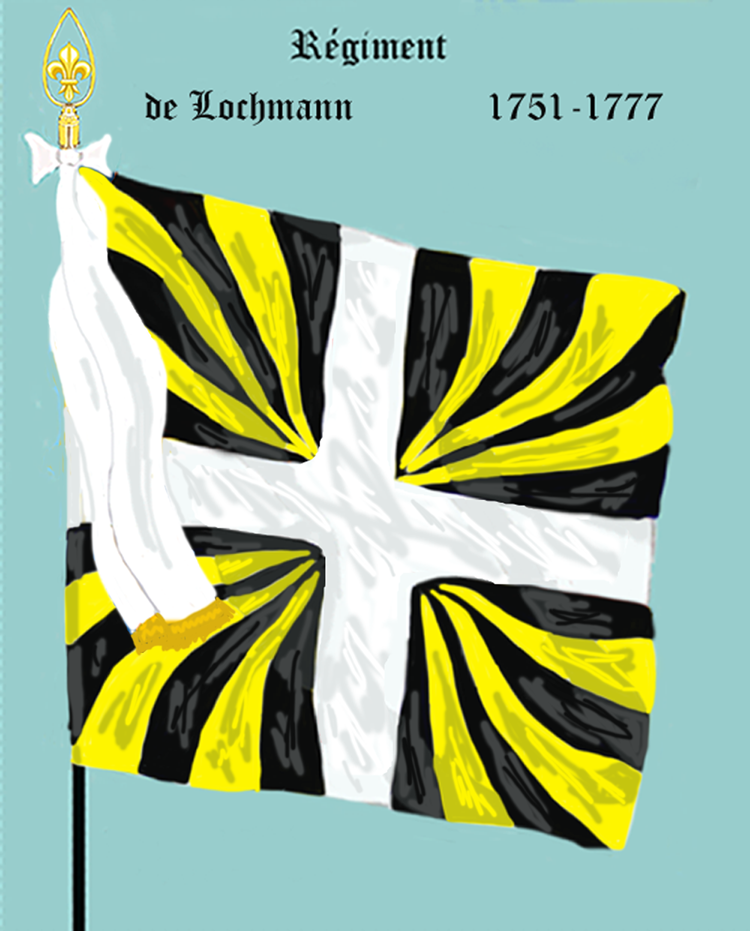
de Lochmann 1751

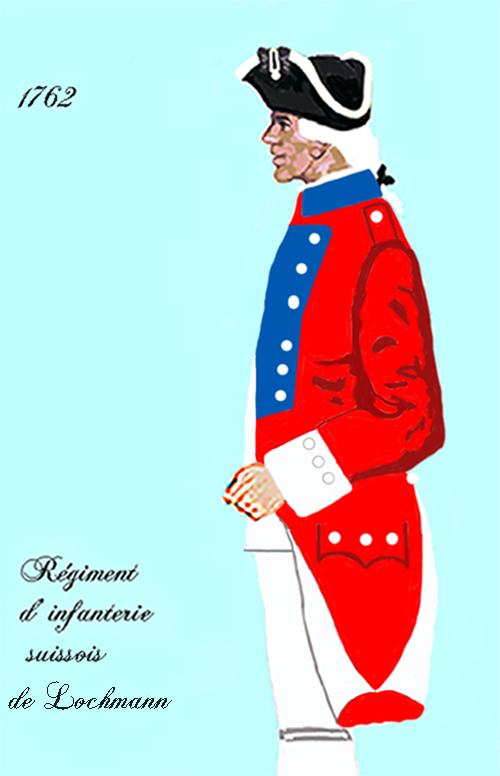
de Lochmann 1762

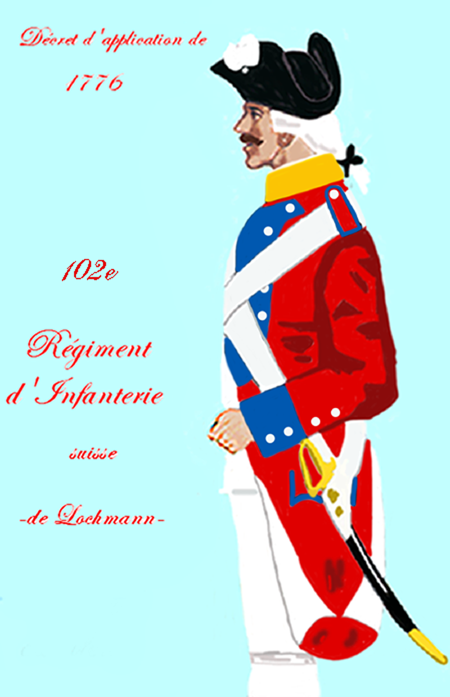
de Lochmann 1776

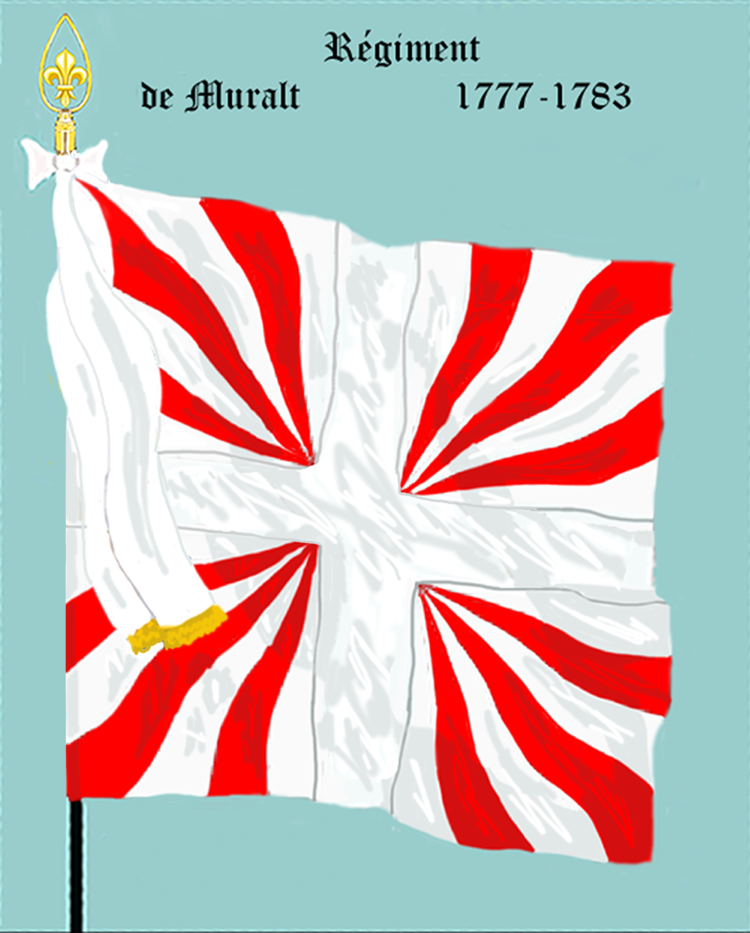
de Muralt

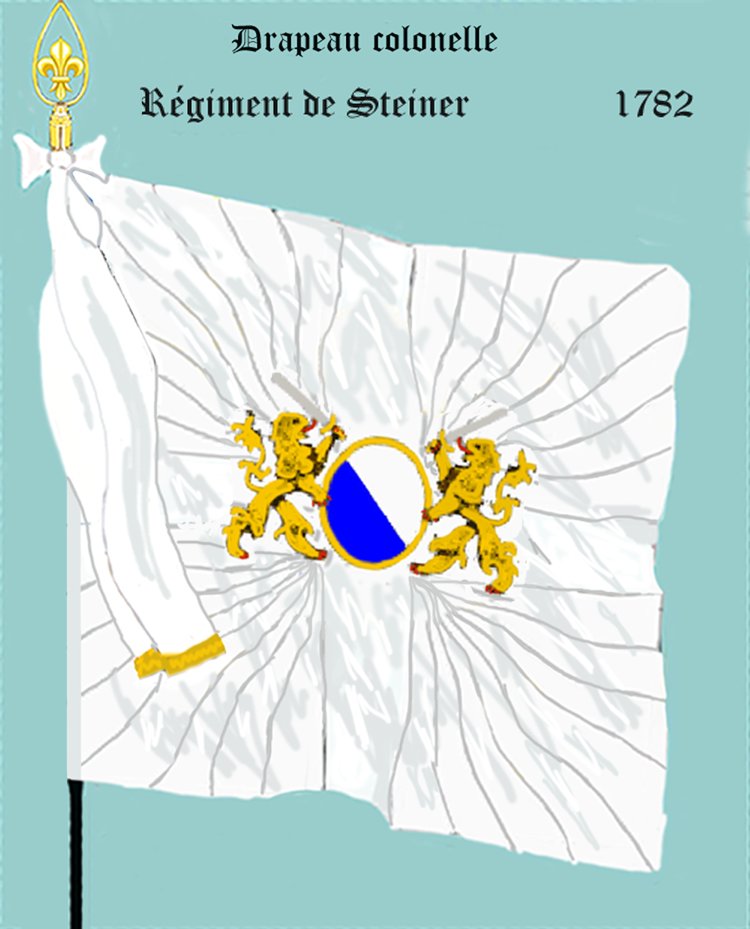
Colonel 1782–1791

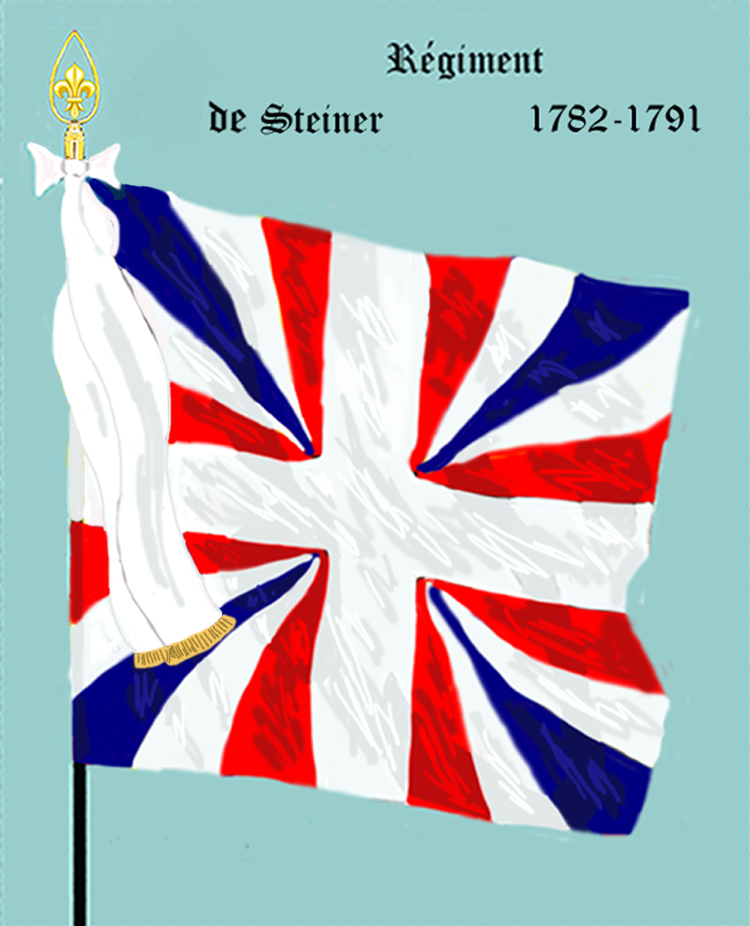
de Steiner

Régiment de Travers
Raised 1734
→ 1740: Régiment de Salis-Soglio
→ 1744: Régiment de Salis Mayenfeld
→ 1762: Régiment de Salis-Marchlin
→ 1791: 95ème régiment d’infanterie de ligne

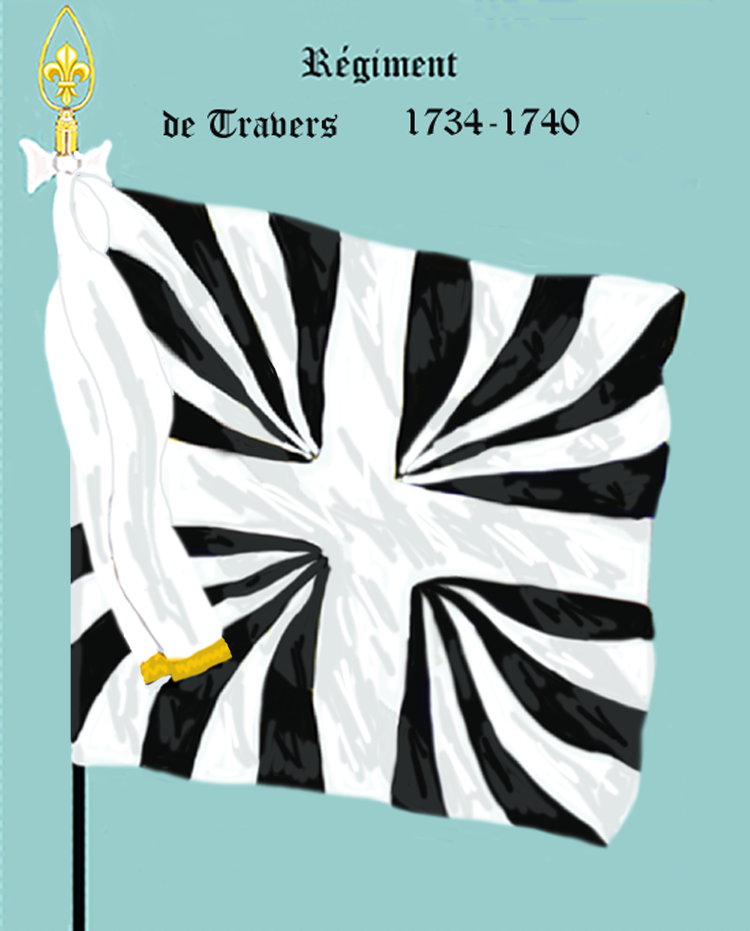
Travers

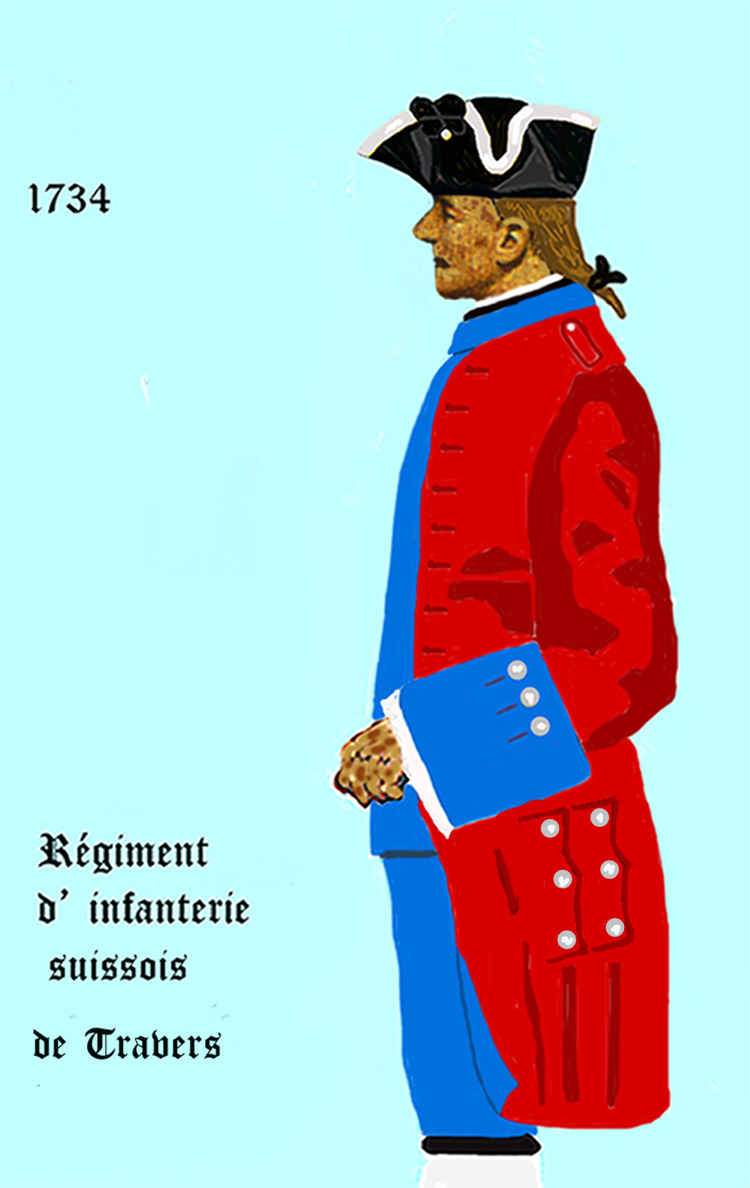
Travers 1734

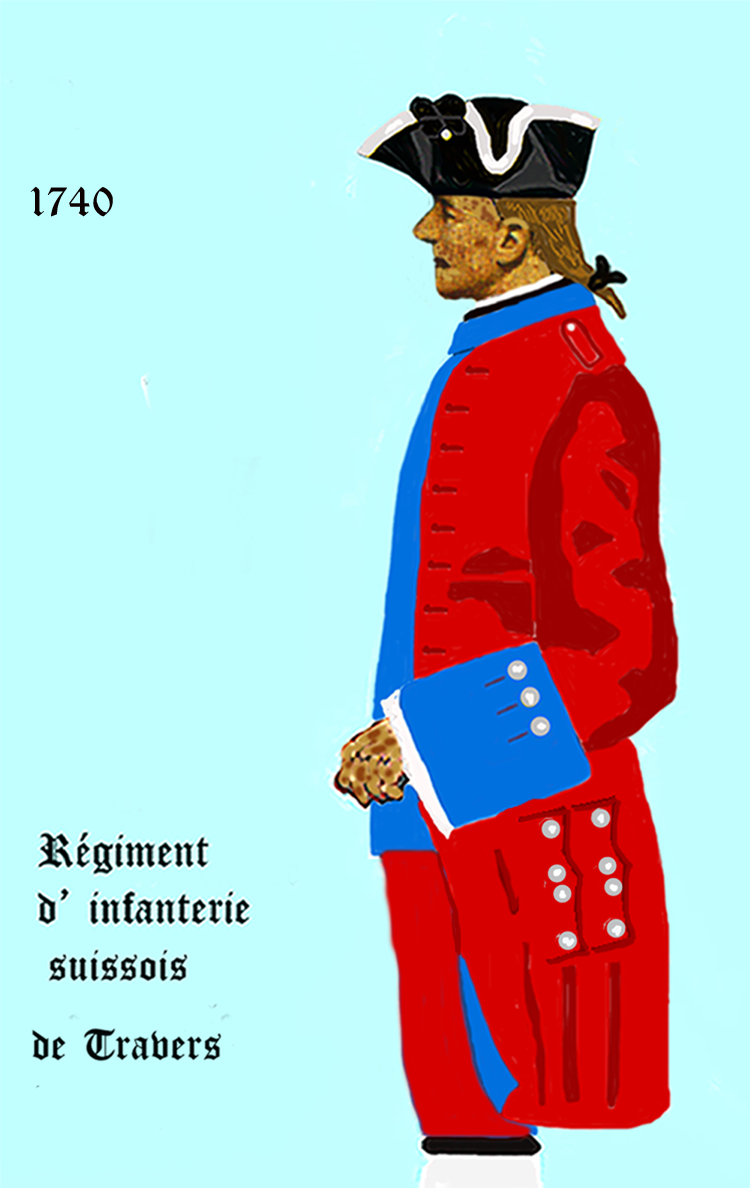
Travers 1740

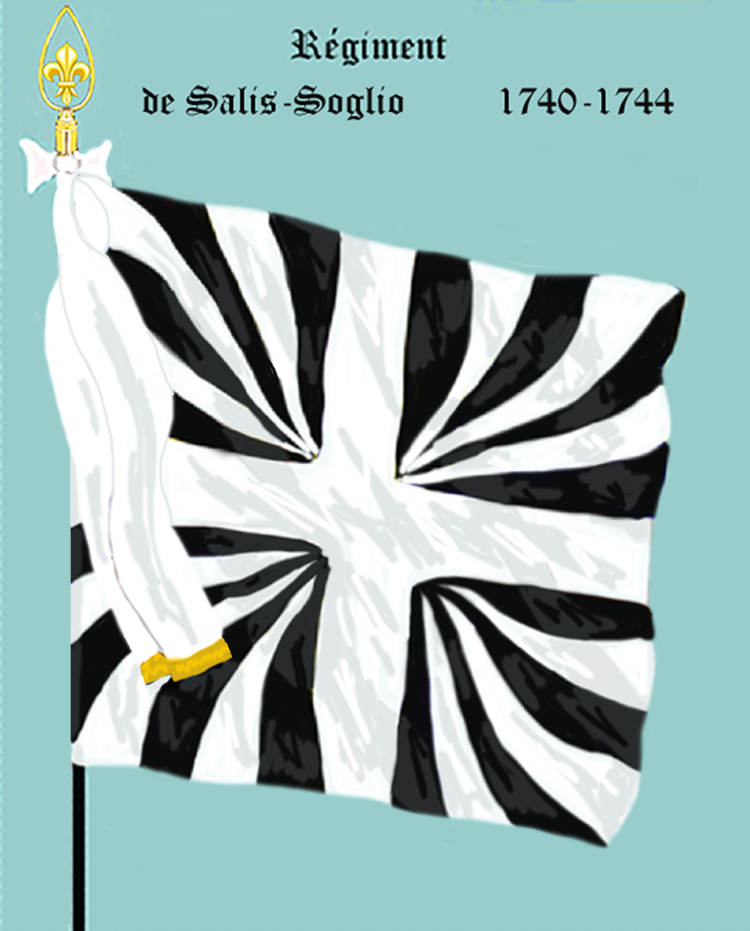
Salis-Soglio

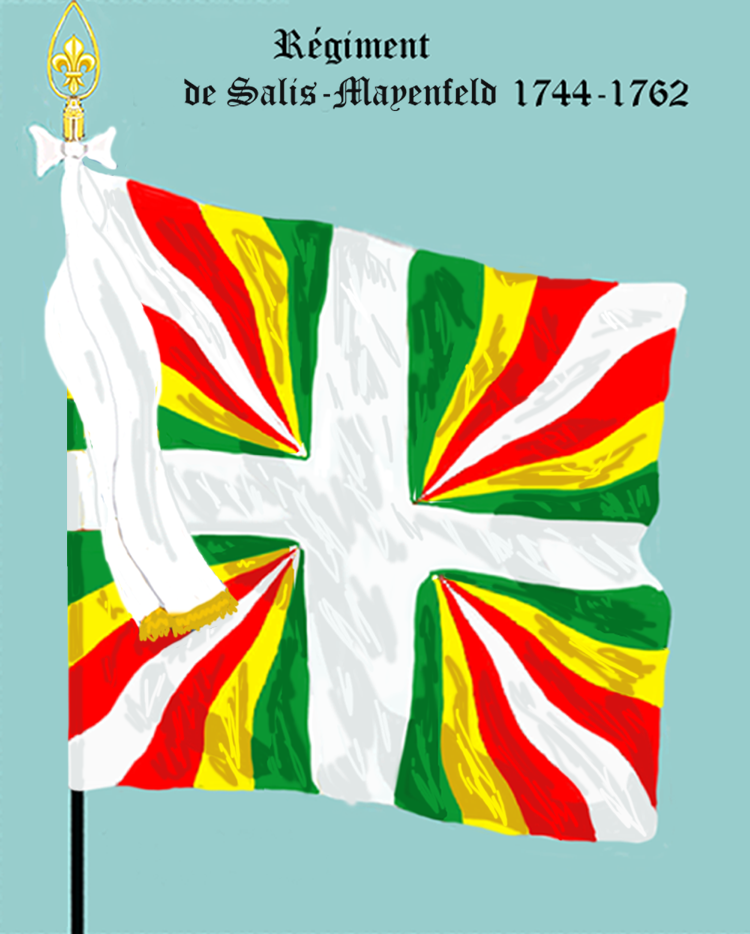
Salis Mayenfeld

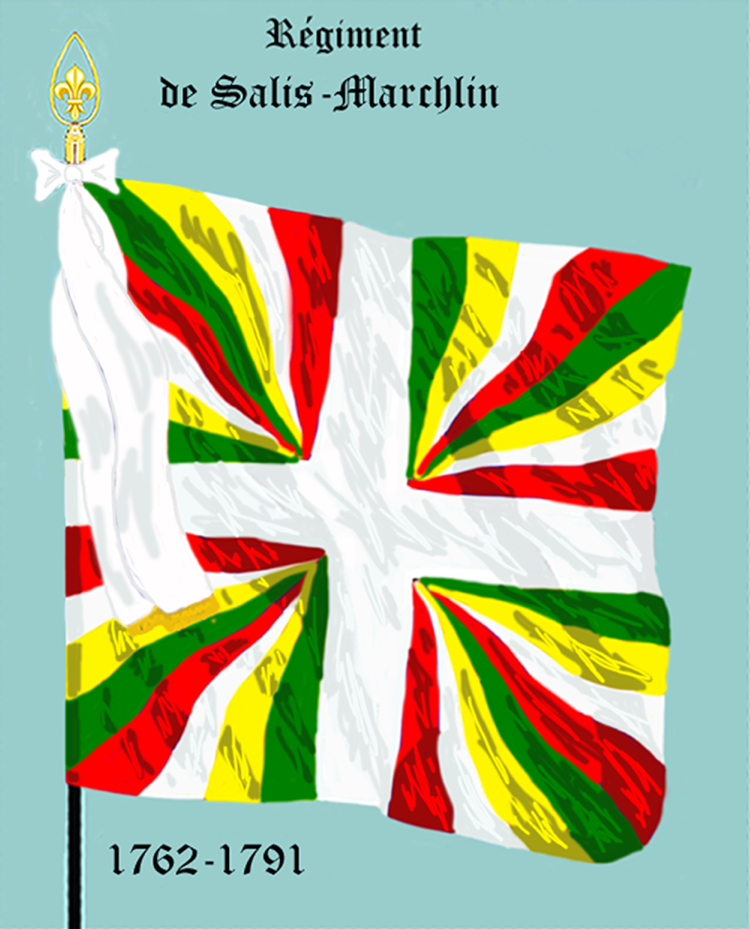
Salis-Marchlin

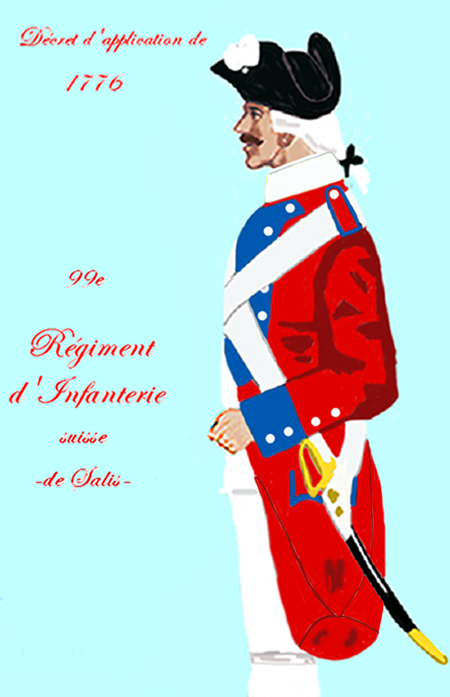
Salis-Marchlin 1776
