= Stark (surname) =

Stark and Starke are German, Swedish, and English surnames; in the German and Swedish languages stark means 'strong' or 'powerful'.

== People ==
Notable people with the surname include:

- Andrew Stark (disambiguation), several people
- Anthony Stark (director) (1961–2011), American film director and screenwriter
- Arthur Stark (1846–1899), British medical doctor and naturalist
- Arthur James Stark (1831–1902), English painter
- Benjamin Stark (1820–1898), American merchant, politician; U.S. Representative and U.S. Senator (D-OR)
- Chris Stark (born 1987), British radio personality
- Christine Stark (born 1970), Canadian volleyball player
- Cynthia Starke-Jones, American politician
- David Stark (disambiguation), several people
- Dolly Stark (1885–1924), American baseball coach and player
- Edward W. Stark (1869–1935), American politician
- Ethel Stark (1916–2012), Canadian violinist and conductor
- Etilmon J. Stark (1868–1962), American composer and arranger
- Dame Freya Stark (1893–1993), English writer about the Middle East
- Grace Stark (born 2001), American hurdler
- Graham Stark (1922–2013), English comedian, actor, writer and director
- Hans Stark (1911–1988), German SS officer and concentration camp overseer at Auschwitz concentration camp
- Harold Stark (born 1939), American mathematician
- Harold Raynsford Stark (1880–1972), U.S. Navy admiral during WWII
- Helen Stark or Hellen Stirk (executed 1544), one of the Perth Martyrs
- Henry Powning Stark (1827–1870), New Zealand politician
- Holger Stark (born 1962), German pharmacist
- Ian Stark (born 1954), Australian equestrian, Olympic medalist in eventing
- James Stark (disambiguation), several people
- Janne Stark (born 1963), Swedish music writer, author and musician
- Jayson Stark (born 1951), American sportswriter
- Johannes Stark (1874–1957), German physicist; Nobel Prize laureate
- John Stark (disambiguation), several people
- Johnny Stark (1922–1989), French talent manager
- John Stillwell Stark (1841–1927), American music publisher
- Jürgen Stark (born 1948), German banker
- Kirsty Stark, Australian film producer
- Lars Johan Stark (1826–1910), American politician
- Leonid Stark (1889–1937), Russian and Soviet revolutionary, diplomat and editor
- Linda Stark (born 2001), German politician
- Katharina Stark (born 1998), German actress
- Koo Stark (born 1956), American actress, model, and photographer
- Leonard P. Stark (born 1969), American judge
- Lisa K. Stark (born 1959), American judge
- Lloyd C. Stark (1886–1972), American businessman and politician, governor of Missouri
- Mabel Stark (1889–1968), American circus performer
- Melissa Stark (born 1973), American television personality
- Menachem Stark (1974–2014), American businessman who was kidnapped and murdered in an intended robbery
- Michaela Stark (born 1994), Australian artist and fashion designer
- Mike Stark, American author, activist, blogger and commentator
- Oliver Stark, British actor
- Oskar Victorovich Stark (1846–1928), Russian vice-admiral
- Pesach Stark (1905–1996), birth name of Julian Stryjkowski, Polish journalist and writer
- Pete Stark (1931–2020), American politician; U.S. Representative (D-CA)
- Péter Stark (born 1978), Hungarian footballer
- Ray Stark (1915–2004), American film producer
- Richard Stark (1933–2008), pseudonym of American writer Donald E. Westlake
- Richard Stark (designer) (born 1960), American fashion designer
- Richard Stark (politician) (born 1952), American Democratic politician from Florida
- Robert L. Stark (born 1951), American real estate developer
- Rodney Stark (1934–2022), American sociologist of religion
- Rudolf Stark (1897–?), German flying ace
- Sandra Stark (born 1951), American photographer
- Sebastian Stark (politician) (born 2000), Austrian politician
- Tibor Stark (born 1972), Hungarian weightlifter
- Wilbur Stark (1912–1995), American film producer
- William Henry Stark (1851–1936), American businessman
- Wolfgang Stark (born 1969), German football referee

=== Starke ===
- Annie Starke (born 1988), American actress
- George Starke (born 1948), American football player
- Hayden Starke (1871–1958), Australian judge
- Mariana Starke (1762–1838), English traveller and author
- Peter Burwell Starke (1815–1888), Confederate general
- Richard Starke (born 1960), Canadian politician from Alberta
- Tom Starke (born 1981), German football goalkeeper
- William E. Starke (1814–1862), Confederate general

== Fictional characters with the surname Stark ==
- House Stark, a fictional noble family in the fantasy novel series A Song of Ice and Fire and its derived works, including TV series Game of Thrones and several games based on the novel series:
  - Ned Stark
  - Catelyn Stark
  - Robb Stark
  - Sansa Stark
  - Arya Stark
  - Bran Stark
  - Rickon Stark
- Stark family in Marvel Comics
  - Howard Stark, father of Tony Stark
  - Maria Stark, mother of Tony Stark
  - Tony Stark, superhero Iron Man
    - Tony Stark (Marvel Cinematic Universe), the 21st-century film version of this superhero
  - Morgan Stark, Tony Stark and Pepper Potts's daughter (MCU) / Tony Stark's cousin (Comics)
- Albert Stark, in A Million Ways to Die in the West
- Dieter Stark, in The Lost World: Jurassic Park
- Eric John Stark, a character created by Leigh Brackett
- Sergeant Ethan Stark, in a novel trilogy by John G. Hemry
- George Stark, in Stephen King's novel The Dark Half
- Hayley Stark, the main protagonist in Hard Candy (film)
- Jim Stark, in Rebel Without a Cause
- Lizzie Stark, in British TV series Peaky Blinders
- Nathan Stark, in the Eureka universe
- Paul Stark, in 1986 TV series Mr. Sunshine
- Deputy District Attorney Sebastian Stark, in TV series Shark
- Stark, in Australian-American TV series Farscape
- Stark, a character in anime/manga Frieren: Beyond Journey's End
- Willie Stark, title character in the 1981 opera by Carlisle Floyd
- Willie Stark (character), in the novel All the King's Men and its film adaptations
- Commander Stark, in the Doctor Who episode "The Pandorica Opens"

== See also ==
- Starck
- Starck (disambiguation)
- Starker (Starcker)
- Stark (disambiguation)
