= Starke =

Starke may refer to:

- Starke, a variant of Stark (surname)
- Starke, Florida, United States
- Starke County, Indiana, United States

== See also ==
- Stark (disambiguation)
- Starck (disambiguation)
- Starks (disambiguation)
- Starke Round Barn, near Red Cloud, Nebraska
