= Stark =

Stark may refer to:

== Arts, entertainment and media ==
=== Fictional entities ===
- Stark, in the video game The Longest Journey
- Stark, in the Japanese manga Frieren
- Stark, in Michael Marshall Smith's novel Only Forward

=== Other uses in arts, entertainment and media ===
- Stark (novel), by Ben Elton, 1989
  - Stark (TV series), a 1993 miniseries based on the novel
- Stark, a 2005 album by Gregory Douglass

== Businesses and organisations ==
- Štark, a food manufacturing company in Belgrade, Serbia
- STARK, a European defence technology company specialising in unmanned weapons systems
- Stark Brothers Nurseries and Orchards, in northeastern Missouri, U.S.
- Stark Candy Company, a candy manufacturer 1939–2008
- Stark Corporation, a Thai holding company in the cable manufacturing industry
- Stark Group, a Danish building materials company

== People ==
- Stark (surname), including a list of people and fictional characters with the surname
- Stark Holborn, a pseudonymous British writer of Westerns and science fiction
- Stark Ritchie (1916–2001), American football player, attorney and lobbyist
- Stark Young (1881–1963), American teacher and writer

== Places ==
=== United States ===
- Stark, Georgia, an unincorporated community
- Stark, Illinois, an unincorporated community
- Stark, Kansas, a city
- Stark, Kentucky, an unincorporated community
- Stark, Minnesota
- Stark, Missouri, an unincorporated community
- Stark City, Missouri
- Stark, New Hampshire, a town
- Stark, New York, a town
- Stark, West Virginia, an unincorporated community
- Stark, Wisconsin, a town
- Stark County (disambiguation), several places
- Stark Township (disambiguation), several places

=== Elsewhere ===
- Stark (crater), on the Moon

== Other uses ==
- Stark, a barley cultivar
- Stark Museum of Art, in Texas, United States
- TAC Stark, a Brazilian vehicle
- USS Stark, a former frigate of the United States Navy

== See also ==
- Starke (disambiguation)
- Starck (disambiguation)
- Starks (disambiguation)
- Starkland, a record label
- Stark and Fulton, an engineering company in Glasgow, Scotland
- Stark Building, Waltham, Massachusetts
- Stark effect, an optical phenomenon in physics
  - Stark spectroscopy
- Stark Law, United States legislation restricting physician self-referrals
- Stark Park, Manchester, New Hampshire
- Stark's Park, a football stadium in Kirkcaldy, Scotland
- Stark Point, James Ross Island, Antarctica
- Stark Ridge, Churchill Mountains, Antarctica
- Stark Rock, south of the Crulls Islands, Antarctica
- Stark Round Barn, near Unityville, South Dakota
- Stark–Heegner theorem, in number theory
- zk-STARK (zero-knowledge Scalable Transparent Argument of Knowledge), a protocol in non-interactive zero-knowledge proofs in cryptography
