= Kracht =

- Pronunciation: German pronunciation: [ˈkʁaxt]

Origin
- Languages: Low German, Dutch
- Meaning: 1. Low German and Dutch form of German: Kraft "1.power, force, strength" 2. Low German giben name Crachto (High German: Krafto, Kraft)
- Region of origin: Netherlands, Northern Germany

Other names
- Variant forms: Kraft, Krafft, Craft, Kraftmann, Kraftlos; Stark, Starker

Kracht is the surname of the following notable people:

- Christian Kracht (born 1966), Swiss novelist and journalist
- Felix Kracht (1912–2002), German engineer
- Marion Kracht (born 1962), German television actress
- Torsten Kracht (born 1967), German football player

== See also ==
- Kracht's theorem (Kracht formula)
- Kracht (film), a 1990 Dutch drama film
- Geeft ons kracht, a 1920 Dutch silent film
