= Starks (surname) =

Starks is an English surname. It comes as a variant of the surname Stark. The added -s has been attributed to "post-medieval" linguistic excrescence, however it has also been viewed as denoting descent from a possessive "Stark's". Alternatively, Starks can be a reduced form of Starkes.

== Notable people with the surname include ==
- Ahmad Starks (born 1992), American basketball player
- Anthony Starks (1873–1952), English rugby footballer
- Argalus Starks (1804–1870), American politician
- Bob Starks (born 1945), American politician
- Carol Starks, British actress
- Catana Starks (1944–2020), American athletics coach
- Kay Starr (born Catherine Laverne Starks) (1922–2016), American singer
- Clifford Starks (born 1981), American mixed martial artist
- Derrick Starks (born 1970), American gospel musician
- Duane Starks (born 1974), American football player
- Edwin Chapin Starks (1867–1932), American ichthyologist
- Geoffrey Starks, American lawyer
- Howard Starks (1929–2003), American poet
- Howard Starks (Canadian football) (born 1944), Canadian football player
- James Starks (born 1986), American football player
- Javontae Starks (born 1989), American boxer
- Jim Starks (1906–?), American baseball player
- John J. Starks (1872–1944), American college administrator
- John "Jabo" Starks (1938–2018), American musician
- John Starks (basketball) (born 1965), American basketball player
- Kyle Starks, American comic artist
- Laura Starks, American economist
- Llewellyn Starks (born 1967), American long jumper
- Malaki Starks (born 2003), American football player
- Marcelous Starks (born 1952), American basketball player
- Markel Starks (born 1991), American basketball player
- Marshall Starks (1939–2016), American football player
- Max Starks (born 1982), American football player
- Otis Starks (1897–1965), American baseball player
- P. J. Starks (born 1982), American filmmaker
- Randy Starks (born 1983), American football player and coach
- Ricky Starks (born 1994), American wrestler
- Sabrina Starks (born 2000), American volleyball player
- Samuel W. Starks (1866–1908), American librarian
- Scott Starks (born 1983), American football player
- Steve Starks, American businessman
- Takia Starks (born 1986), American basketball player
- Timothy Starks (born 1963), American football player
- Timothy Starks (actor) (born 1969), American actor
- TJ Starks (born 1998), American basketball player
- Tony Starks (born 1970), pseudonym of American rapper Ghostface Killah
- Tricia Starks, American historian
- Yvonne Starks Wilson (1929–2019), American politician

== See also ==
- Starks (disambiguation), other meanings
- Sally Starks Emory
