= Inter-Allied Rhineland High Commission =

Commission overseeing the Rhineland occupation 1920–1930

Interallied Rhineland High Commission
- Formation: January 10, 1920
- Region served: Rhineland, Prussia, Weimar Republic

The Inter-Allied Rhineland High Commission was created by the Treaty of Versailles on 28 June 1919, to supervise the occupation of the Rhineland and "ensure, by any means, the security and satisfaction of all the needs of the Armies of Occupation". It came into being on 10 January 1920, when the treaty came into force. It was based in Coblenz.

== Members of the High Commission ==
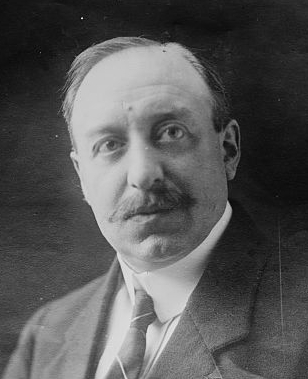
Paul Tirard, Chairman of the IARHC

Chairman of the Inter-Allied Rhineland High Commission (in Coblenz)

- 1919 - 1930 Paul Tirard (French Third Republic)

High Commissioners:

- Pierrepont Noyes (United States) (1919 - May 1920)
- Henry Tureman Allen (United States) (May 1920 - 24 January 1923)
- Émile Digneffe (Belgium) (June 1919 - 1920)
- Baron Rolin Jacquemyns (Belgium) (January 1920 - July 1925)
- Pierre Forthomme (Belgium) (July 1925 - 4 March 1929)
- Jules Le Jeune de Münsbach (Belgium) (4 March 1929 - 30 June 1930)
- Harold Stuart (United Kingdom of Great Britain and Ireland) (1919 - October 1920)
- Malcolm Arnold Robertson (United Kingdom of Great Britain and Ireland) (10 October 1920 - December 1921)
- Victor Hay, 21st Earl of Erroll (United Kingdom of Great Britain and Ireland) / (United Kingdom) (1 December 1921 - 20 February 1928)
- William Seeds (United Kingdom) (May 1928 - January 1930)
- James Herbertson (United Kingdom) (30 January 1930 - 30 June 1930)

Non Voting co-optee

- Karl von Starck (17 June 1919 - 27 May 1921)
- Prince Hermann von Hatzfeldt-Wildenburg (30 September 1921 - 17 April 1923)
- Baron Ernst Langwerth von Simmern (6 November 1925 - 30 June 1930)

Chairman of the Inter-Allied Military Control Commission (For Germany, after 1922)

- 1919 - 1924 Charles Marie Edouard Nollet (French Third Republic)
- 1924 - 1927 Camille Walch (French Third Republic)

== Legal instrument of the Commission ==
Part XIV, Section i of the Treaty of Versailles stipulated:

Article 428

As a guarantee for the execution of the present Treaty by Weimar Republic, the German territory situated to the west of the Rhine, together with the bridgeheads, will be occupied by Allied and Associated troops for a period of fifteen years from the coming into force of the present Treaty.

Article 429

If the conditions of the present Treaty are faithfully carried out by Germany, the occupation referred to in Article 428 will be successively restricted as follows:

(i) At the expiration of five years there will be evacuated: the bridgehead of Cologne and the territories north of a line running along the Ruhr, then along the railway Jülich, Duren, Euskirchen, Rheinbach, thence along the road Rheinbach to Sinzig, and reaching the Rhine at the confluence with the Ahr; the roads, railways and places mentioned above being excluded from the area evacuated.

(ii) At the expiration of ten years there will be evacuated: the bridgehead of Coblenz and the territories north of a line to be drawn from the intersection between the frontiers of Belgium, Germany and Holland, running about from 4 kilometres south of Aix-la-Chapelle, then to and following the crest of Forst Gemünd, then east of the railway of the Urft valley, then along Blankenheim, Waldorf, Dreis, Ulmen to and following the Moselle from Bremm to Nehren, then passing by Kappel and Simmern, then following the ridge of the heights between Simmern and the Rhine and reaching this river at Bacharach; all the places valleys, roads and railways mentioned above being excluded from the area evacuated.

(iii) At the expiration of fifteen years there will be evacuated: the bridgehead of Mainz, the bridgehead of Kehl and the remainder of the German territory under occupation.

If at that date the guarantees against unprovoked aggression by Germany are not considered sufficient by the Allied and Associated Governments, the evacuation of the occupying troops may be delayed to the extent regarded as necessary for the purpose of obtaining the required guarantees.

Article 430

In case either during the occupation or after the expiration of the fifteen years referred to above the Reparation Commission finds that Germany refuses to observe the whole or part of her obligations under the present Treaty with regard to reparation, the whole or part of the areas specified in Article 429 will be reoccupied immediately by the Allied and Associated forces.

Article 431

If before the expiration of the period of fifteen years Germany complies with all the undertakings resulting from the present Treaty, the occupying forces will be withdrawn immediately.

== See also ==
- Occupation of the Ruhr
- British Summary Court
- Military Inter-Allied Commission of Control

== Bibliography ==
- Carsten, F.L. (1944). "The British Summary Court at Wiesbaden, 1926-1929". Modern Law Review. 7 (4). Blackwell Publishing: 215–220. doi:10.1111/j.1468-2230.1944.tb00986.x. ISSN 0026-7961.
- Pawley, Margaret (2007). The Watch on the Rhine: The Military Occupation of the Rhineland, 1918-1930. I.B.Tauris. ISBN 978-1-84511-457-2.
