= Starck =

Starck is a German surname, which means a strong, bold person, from the Middle High German starke, meaning 'strong' or 'brave'. The name may refer to:

- Colby Starck (born 1974), American musician
- Johann August von Starck (1741–1816), German writer
- Karl von Starck (1867–1937), German politician
- Philippe Starck (born 1949), French designer
- Ville-Valtteri Starck (born 1995), Finnish footballer

== See also ==
- Starck (disambiguation)
- Stark (surname), including Starke
