= Occupation of the Rhineland =

1918–1930 occupation by the WWI Allies

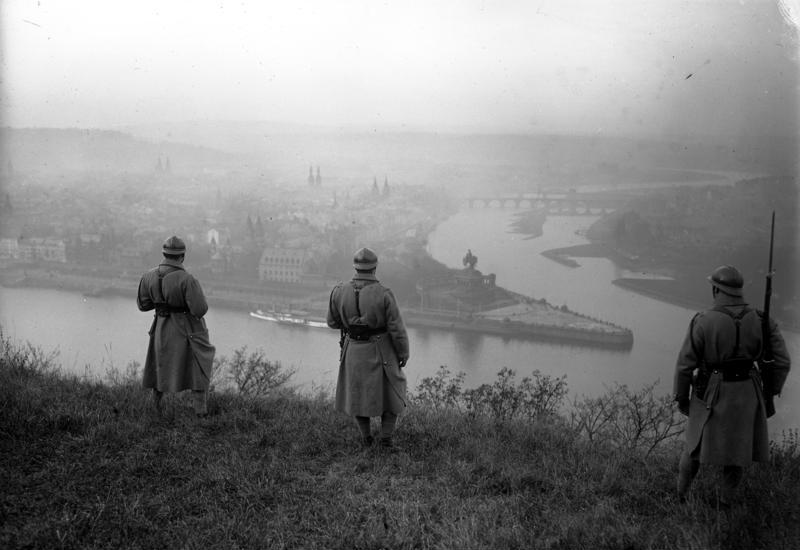
- French soldiers at Ehrenbreitstein Fortress watching over the Deutsches Eck, 1929
- Date: 1 December 1918 – 30 June 1930
- Duration: 11 years, 6 months, 4 weeks and 1 day
- Location: Left Bank of the Rhine, Germany; 50°21′N 7°36′E

The Occupation of the Rhineland placed the region of Germany west of the Rhine river and four bridgeheads to its east under the control of the victorious Allies of World War I from 1 December 1918 until 30 June 1930. The occupation was imposed and regulated by articles in the Armistice of 11 November 1918, the Treaty of Versailles and the parallel agreement on the Rhineland occupation signed at the same time as the Versailles Treaty. The Rhineland was demilitarised, as was an area stretching fifty kilometres east of the Rhine, and put under the control of the Inter-Allied Rhineland High Commission, which was led by a French commissioner and had one member each from Belgium, the United Kingdom and the United States (the latter in an observer role only). The purpose of the occupation was to give France and Belgium security against any future German attack and serve as a guarantee for Germany's reparations obligations. After Germany fell behind on its payments in 1922, the occupation was expanded to include the industrial Ruhr valley from 1923 to 1925.

In the early years of the occupation, a number of separatist movements – some supported by the French – attempted to create an independent Rhineland allied to France, but none of them had significant popular support. Relations between the occupying forces and the German residents were often strained, although more so in the French and Belgian zones than in the American and British. Both the French and the Germans engaged in major propaganda campaigns, the French to try to win the Rhinelanders over to their side and the Germans to rouse national and international feelings against the occupation. The German propaganda war included racist attacks against black French colonial troops.

Following the signing of the Locarno Treaties that settled Germany's western border in late 1925, the northern occupation zone around Cologne was evacuated in January 1926. The Koblenz region, which the Americans had handed over to the French in 1923, was evacuated in November 1929. After a "final" agreement on reparations was reached in the 1929 Young Plan, the occupation of the Rhineland ended on 30 June 1930, five years earlier than originally set down in the Treaty of Versailles.

== Timeline ==
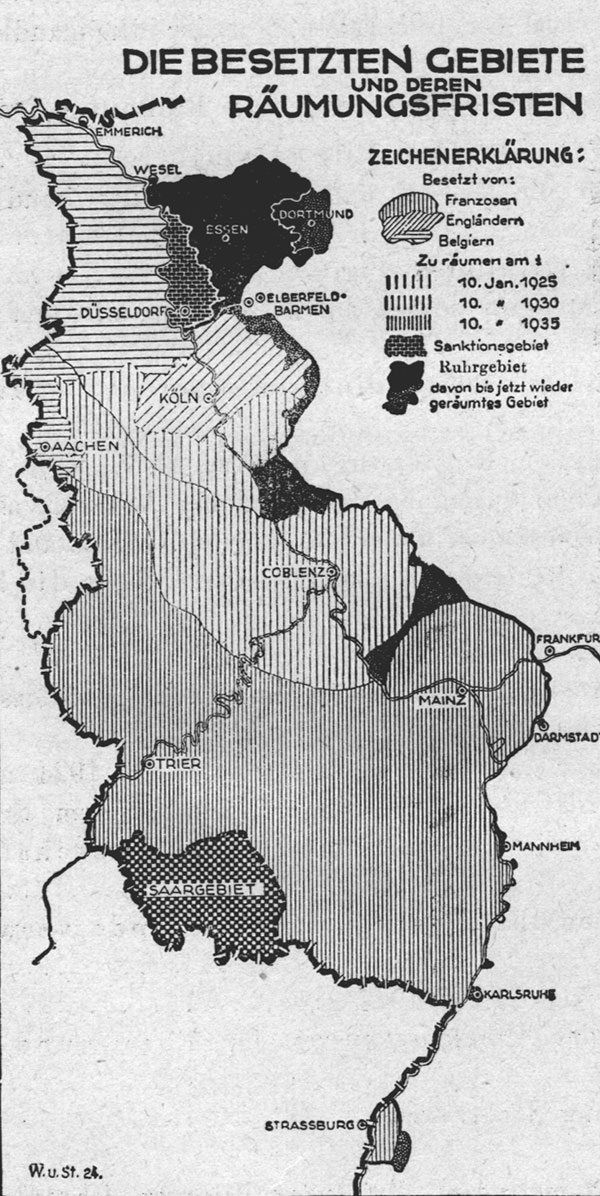
Occupation of the Rhineland and Saar regions: vertically hatched: France, now including the former American zone around Koblenz horizontally hatched: Belgium diagonally hatched: Great Britain dark: Ruhr, joint-occupation by France and Belgium dark dotted: Saarland, also to France, though under the auspices of the League of Nations

- 11 November 1918: Armistice ending the fighting in World War I signed
- 28 June 1919: Treaty of Versailles and the Rhineland Agreement signed
- 10 January 1920: Treaty of Versailles and Rhineland Agreement came into force; the Inter-Allied Rhineland High Commission established
- 11 January 1923: Occupation of the Ruhr began; lasted until 25 August 1925
- January 1926: Withdrawal from the northern occupation zone around Cologne
- November 1929: Withdrawal from the central zone around Koblenz
- 30 June 1930: Withdrawal from the southern zone around Mainz, resulting in the end of the occupation
- 7 March 1936: German remilitarisation of the Rhineland under Adolf Hitler

== Background ==
=== Versailles negotiations ===
At the peace negotiations that began in Versailles in January 1919, French prime minister Georges Clemenceau sought to fix France's border with Germany at the Rhine. All the territories on the west bank of the river were to be detached from Germany and form one or more sovereign states aligned with the French Third Republic. He saw the idea, which had originated with General Ferdinand Foch, as the only way to remain secure against Germany, noting that it had invaded France four times in 100 years (1814, 1815, 1870 and 1914).

Clemenceau was unable to convince his allies to accept the proposal. U.S. president Woodrow Wilson advocated the right of peoples to self-determination, which he said should not be denied the Germans. British prime minister David Lloyd George did not want the settlement to "leave a legacy of injustice which would rankle as Alsace–Lorraine had rankled".

As a compromise, the United States and the United Kingdom agreed that if Germany should attack France again, they would enter the war on its side. Clemenceau then accepted a maximum fifteen-year time limit for the occupation. As a prerequisite for withdrawal, Germany would be required to fulfil the requirements of the peace treaty and meet its reparations obligations on time. The function of the occupation was thus changed from an instrument for weakening Germany to a bargaining chip for Germany's reparations obligations.

=== Treaty provisions ===
Article 42 of the Treaty of Versailles stipulated that the west bank of the Rhine and "the right bank to the west of a line drawn 50 kilometres to the East of the Rhine" be demilitarised. The provisions that related specifically to the occupation of the Rhineland were laid out in articles 428 through 432. The key article (428) states:

As a guarantee for the execution of the present Treaty by Germany, the German territory situated to the west of the Rhine, together with the bridgeheads [at Cologne, Koblenz, Mainz and Kehl, per Article 429], will be occupied by Allied and Associated troops for a period of fifteen years from the coming into force of the present Treaty.

Article 429 added that if Germany fulfilled its obligations under the treaty, the Cologne region (under the British) would be evacuated after five years, the Koblenz zone (American) after ten years, and the remainder after fifteen years.

On 28 June 1919, the day on which the Treaty of Versailles was signed, France, Belgium, Great Britain, the United States, and Germany signed a separate agreement "with regard to the military occupation of the territories of the Rhine" as provided for in Article 432 of the Treaty.

The thirteen articles of the Rhineland Agreement included the following points:

- The occupation of the west bank of the Rhine under the stipulations of the Armistice of 1918 was to continue.
- No German troops were permitted in the zone; that is, it was to be demilitarised.
- The Inter-Allied Rhineland High Commission (IARHC) was constituted as the supreme representative of the Allied Powers in the occupied Rhineland. It was to be made up of one member each from Belgium, France, Great Britain and the United States. It could issue such ordinances as it thought necessary.
- Germany retained civil and criminal jurisdiction except for offenses against occupation troops, which were subject to Allied military jurisdiction.
- Civil administration also remained in German hands, except where the IARHC deemed it otherwise necessary for the needs of the occupation.
- Germany was to bear the costs of the occupation.
- Allied troops were to be housed in German military facilities. If those proved insufficient, the occupation authorities could take possession of any facilities they thought necessary. Civilian and military officers and their families could be billeted on German civilians.
- The IARHC could declare a state of siege wherever and whenever it thought necessary. Military authorities could use the means they believed were required to restore order when it was threatened.

== Occupation ==
The occupied Rhineland made up 6.5% of Germany's total area and had a population of about seven million. While the negotiations for the Treaty of Versailles were in progress, the region was under a state of siege and the number of occupation troops stood at approximately 240,000 (220,000 French and 20,000 Belgian). By February 1920, a year after the Treaty had gone into effect, the number had dropped to 94,000 French and 16,000 Belgian troops.

In March and April 1920, a violent workers' uprising in the Ruhr district was suppressed by the German Reichswehr with assistance from units of the paramilitary Freikorps. As a reaction to the incursion of German troops into the demilitarised zone east of the Rhine, French troops temporarily occupied Frankfurt am Main, Darmstadt and several other smaller cities beginning on 6 April 1920. A much more substantial Ruhr occupation took place from 1923 to 1925 as a result of German default on its reparations obligations; for that part of the occupation, see §The Ruhr, below.

=== Inter-Allied Rhineland High Commission ===
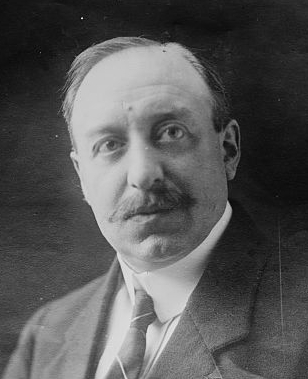
Paul Tirard, the French chairman of the Inter-Allied Rhineland High Commission

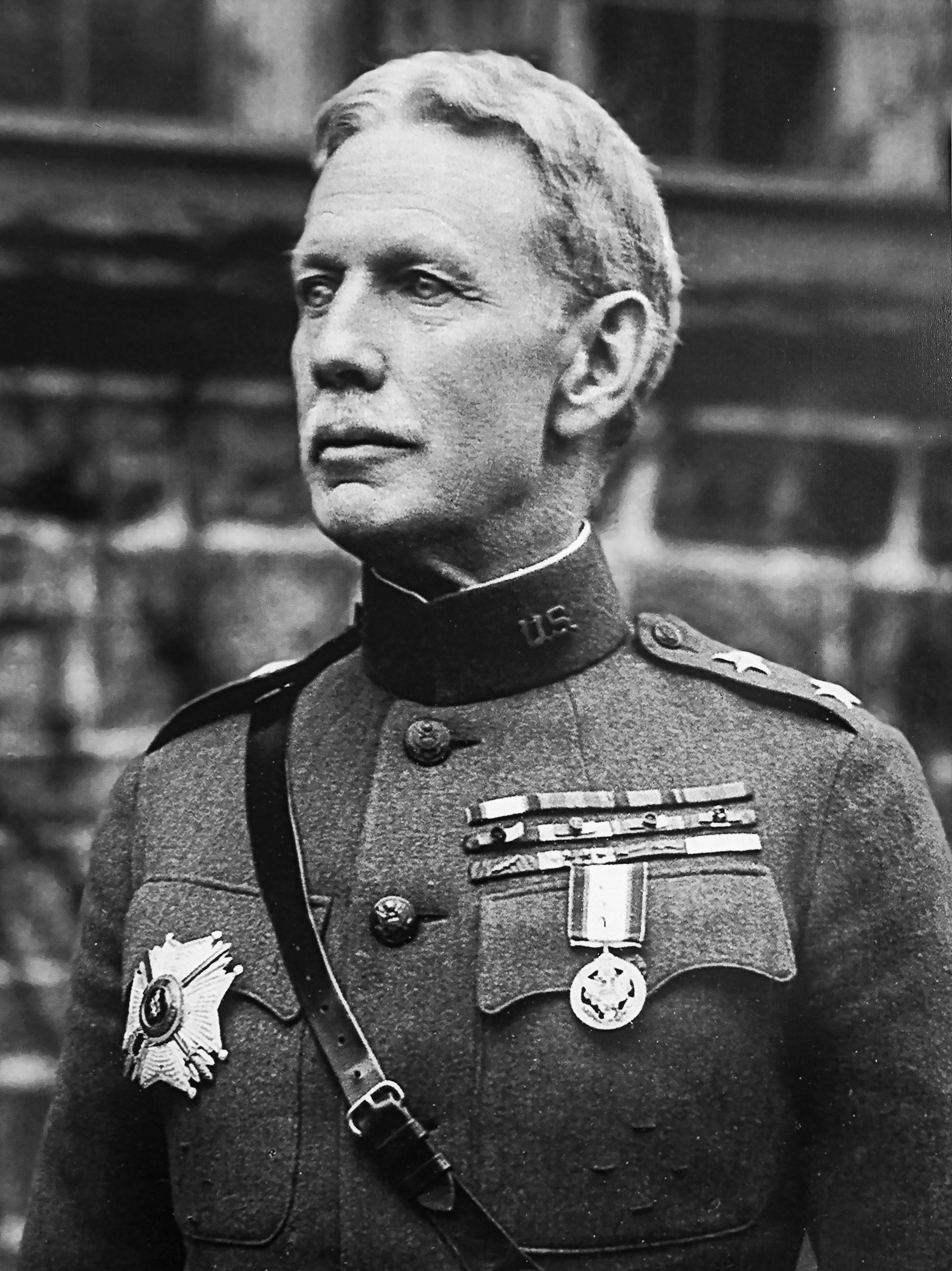
Henry T. Allen, commander-in-chief of the American occupation army in the Rhineland

The Inter-Allied Rhineland High Commission (IARHC), which had its headquarters in Koblenz, was led by Paul Tirard, the French high commissioner. It was conceived as a civil authority independent of the governments supporting it. Because the United States Senate did not ratify the Treaty of Versailles, the American representative, General Henry Tureman Allen, was only an unofficial observer on the Commission, although either he or a deputy attended all Commission meetings, and when Allen attended he expressed his opinions freely. At the request of the state of Prussia, to which the majority of the occupied territory belonged, German interests were represented by the newly created Reich Commissioner's Office for the Occupied Rhine Territories. The first Prussian state commissioner was Karl von Starck; he was succeeded in 1921 by Hermann von Hatzfeldt-Wildenburg. Bavaria also had a state commissioner, since a small part of its territory was also occupied.

The legislative powers of the Commission, which had been granted to it in order to protect the occupying troops, were not precisely defined. The Commission was authorised to both approve and amend national laws affecting the Rhineland and decrees issued by Rhineland officials, making it de facto the supreme public authority in the occupied Rhineland. The Commission supervised German administration in the occupied territory through a system of district delegates who were placed at the side of the respective local German administrative officers.

In March 1921, Germany created a special department within the Ministry of the Interior to handle matters relating to the occupied territories. In August 1923, the department became the cabinet-level Reich Ministry for the Occupied Territories. It was tasked with safeguarding German interests in dealing with he occupying powers, including the IARHC, and with representing the interests of the occupied territories in the Berlin government.

=== Separatism ===
Separatist agitation took place in the Rhineland even while peace negotiations were ongoing. Separatism was generally supported by the French government as part of their program of cultural propaganda. High Commissioner Tirard initially favoured an independent Rhenish state. Most French and Belgian authorities either agreed with him or wanted at least to have the Rhineland separated from the state of Prussia, whereas the British and Americans were hesitant to accept such proposals, if not opposed to them outright.

Hans Adam Dorten, a German lawyer who had fought in World War I, declared a separate Rhineland Republic on 1 June 1919, but he had little support and it quickly failed. He was equally unsuccessful later in the year when he tried to make the Rhineland a separate state within Germany. Lack of popular support also brought a quick end to an unrelated attempt in 1923 to set up a separatist government under the French garrison. One reason for the failures was that the Catholic Centre Party had considerable influence in the region and did not support the separatist movements.

The most serious event connected to separatism came to be known as the Düsseldorf Bloody Sunday. On 30 September 1923, thousands of separatists held a march through the city in support of a Rhenish republic under a French protectorate. After shots were fired from an unknown source, the French military came to the aid of the separatists. At least 10 people were killed and 150 wounded. French military courts later sentenced a number of Düsseldorf police officers to long prison terms.

The separatist movements had ended by early 1924.

=== The Ruhr ===
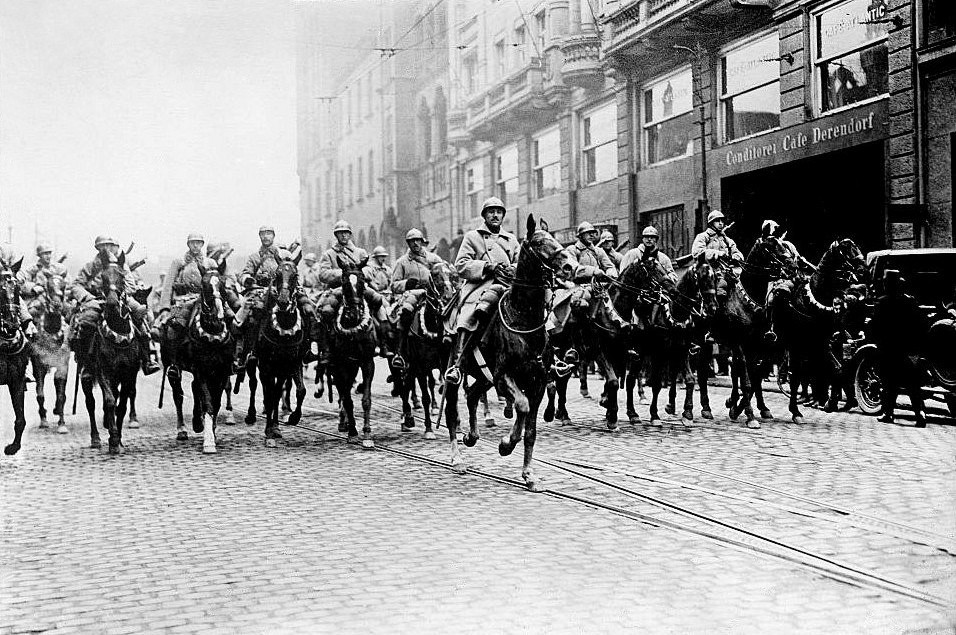
French troops entering Essen during the occupation of the Ruhr

On 11 January 1923, French and Belgian troops occupied the industrial Ruhr district east of the Rhine after Germany fell behind in the reparations payments required of it under the Treaty of Versailles. Military law was imposed, local governments were placed under French control, and the Inter-allied Control Mission for Factories and Mines (MICUM) took over administration of the steel works and mines. Germany responded with a policy of passive resistance. Work in the factories and mines stopped, and the German government supported the region's idled workers through printing additional money, which led to the hyperinflation that all but wrecked the German economy. During the course of the Ruhr occupation, 132 Germans were killed and approximately 188,000 evicted from their homes.

France's economy also suffered during the Ruhr occupation. It turned to Britain and the United States for assistance, and together they developed the Dawes Plan. It lowered and restructured Germany's reparations payments, and France agreed to vacate the Ruhr. The evacuation was completed on 25 August 1925.

=== German–Allied relations ===
Relations between the German population and the occupying forces were the most difficult early on. The French especially used harsh measures such as martial law, curfews, restrictions on communication with the rest of Germany and requirements that German officials salute French officers. Billeting caused shortages of housing and food, and some cities, such as Aachen, became so crowded that they began to feel like garrisons to their inhabitants. There were frequent outbreaks of minor violence. Expulsion of "undesirables", which was permissible under terms of the treaty, led to 40,000 heads of household and 110,000 family members being forced to leave the French occupied territory (numbers do not include the Ruhr occupation).

The Belgians were the most restrictive against fraternisation, while the French permitted "mixed" marriages on a case-by-case basis. They nevertheless denied almost all accusations of sexual violence, even in cases where punishments were meted out internally by their military. Germans who fraternised could face stigmatisation or physical violence within their own communities.

=== Propaganda ===
Both sides used propaganda extensively during the course of the occupation. Because German Francophile and separatist feelings were not as strong as the French had thought, their early attempts to tap into them failed. Paul Tirard, in a campaign conducted largely independently of the French government, tried to win the Germans over through a policy of "peaceful penetration" that included cultural events and special benefits. He wanted to convince both the German Rhinelanders and the French population that annexing the region to France would benefit both sides. A press agency was set up in Koblenz, and in Mainz a bilingual magazine was published with the aim of reviving the "spiritual connection" between Germany and France. Courses in the French language were also offered in the occupied region. Tirard's propaganda efforts overall had little effect in either the Rhineland or France, although the German press picked up on them as an emotionally laden topic to use against the French.

The German propaganda campaign was poorly coordinated until the cabinet-level Ministry for the Occupied Territories was established in August 1923 and the Rheinische Volkspflege (Rhineland People's Welfare) was placed under its control. The Rheinische Volkspflege had been set up in 1920 as an unofficial cover organisation to finance and coordinate anti-French propaganda. It saw itself as part of a struggle for national liberation with the goal of achieving an early withdrawal of the occupation forces. The campaign was aimed in part at winning over world opinion. In hundreds of publications it used images such as those of starving German children to rouse anger against France. The language was sometimes quite exaggerated, as for example the following from the time of the Ruhr occupation:

Are we still willing to tolerate the French and Belgian thieves and murderers? Are we still willing to put up with the brutality, the acts of thievery and murder, the vilification, the desecrations, the expulsions and bestial harassment perpetrated everywhere by the French and Belgian intruders? And do we have to allow ourselves to be treated like dogs in our homeland by the debauchees who have broken in? Are we still willing to watch the French and Belgian invaders [...] slaughter our citizens? Are we still willing to bring upon ourselves the bloody French and Belgian courts that condemn innocent Germans to bestial death sentences, inhuman prison terms and extortionate fines?

=== "Black Horror on the Rhine" ===
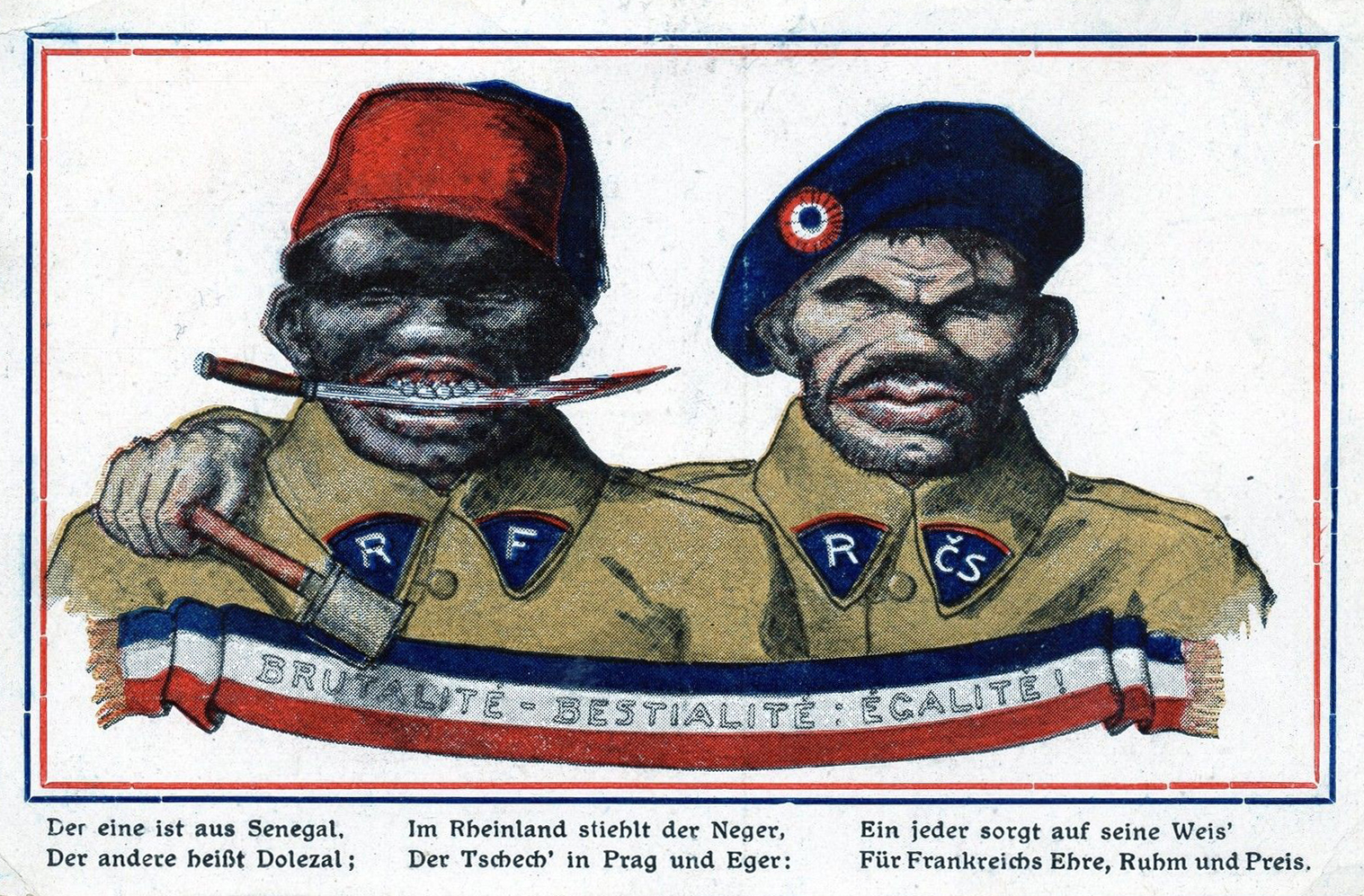
"Brutality, Bestiality, Equality". German postcard sent in January 1923, depicting a Senegalese soldier of the French army alongside a Czech one. The verse text reads: "The one is from Senegal / The other is called Dolezal [Czech nickname for a lazy man] / The Negro steals in the Rhineland / The Czech in Prague and Eger / Each in his way looks out for / France's honour, glory and praise."

The most notable of the propaganda campaigns was the Germans' "Black Horror on the Rhine" (Schwarze Schmach), a racist appeal against the African colonial soldiers who made up part of the French occupation troops. Their numbers averaged around 25,000; most were from French North Africa. The German propaganda push took shape after the failed Kapp Putsch of March 1920 and was supported by the government in Berlin and widely across the political spectrum, with the exception of the far left Independent Social Democrats and the Communist Party of Germany. The propaganda used graphic depictions of African "barbarians" allegedly raping German women and girls. The supposed crimes were made into a metaphor for Germany's post-war "subjection" by the victorious Allies. The propaganda, which peaked in 1920–1921, roused enough internal and international criticism for the German government to reduce its support and rein in the most racist elements. By the time of the Ruhr occupation in early 1923, this particular part of the propaganda campaign had been significantly scaled back.

=== End of the occupation ===
The British occupation zone around Cologne was to have been vacated in January 1925, but it was delayed by the French due to disagreements about the German army's compliance with the armaments reduction requirements imposed on it in the Treaty of Versailles. As a result of the agreements reached in the Locarno Treaties, British troops withdrew from their zone in January 1926. After Germany accepted the Young Plan, which was negotiated in a second attempt to settle the issue of German reparations, the Allies agreed to evacuate the Rhineland by 30 June 1930, five years before the date set in the Treaty of Versailles. The occupation zone that included Koblenz was evacuated in November 1929, and the last of the occupying troops withdrew from the Mainz zone on 30 June 1930. The evacuation was followed by bloody German settlements with separatists who had cooperated with the French.

In accordance with the Treaty of Versailles – and also the Locarno Treaties, in which Germany had voluntarily agreed to the demilitarisation of its territory west of a line drawn 50 kilometres east of the Rhine in 1925 – the area remained a demilitarised zone until Adolf Hitler had it occupied by the Wehrmacht in breach of the treaties on 7 March 1936.

== Occupying forces ==
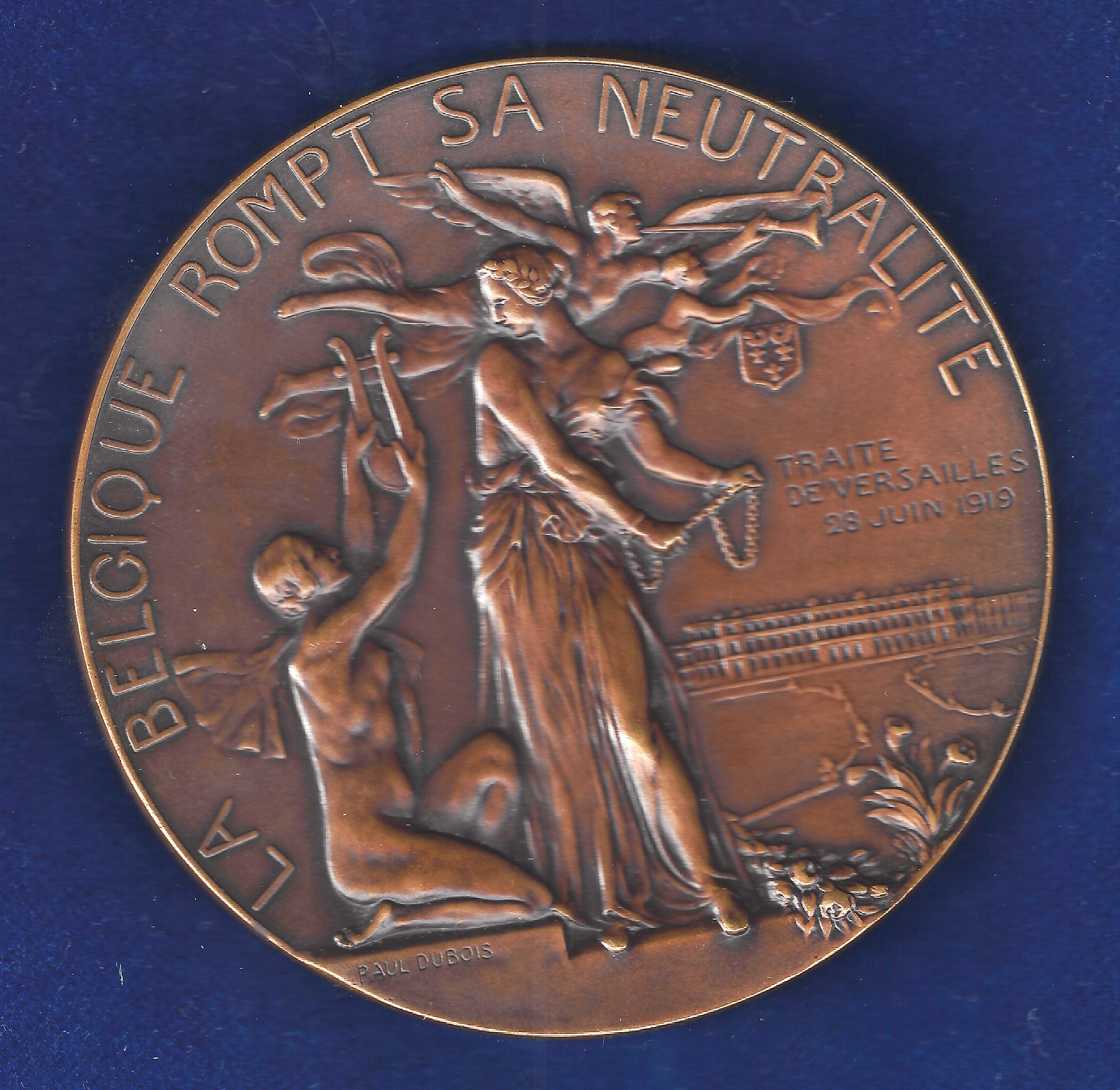
1919 Belgian medal by Paul Du Bois reading "Belgium breaks its neutrality"

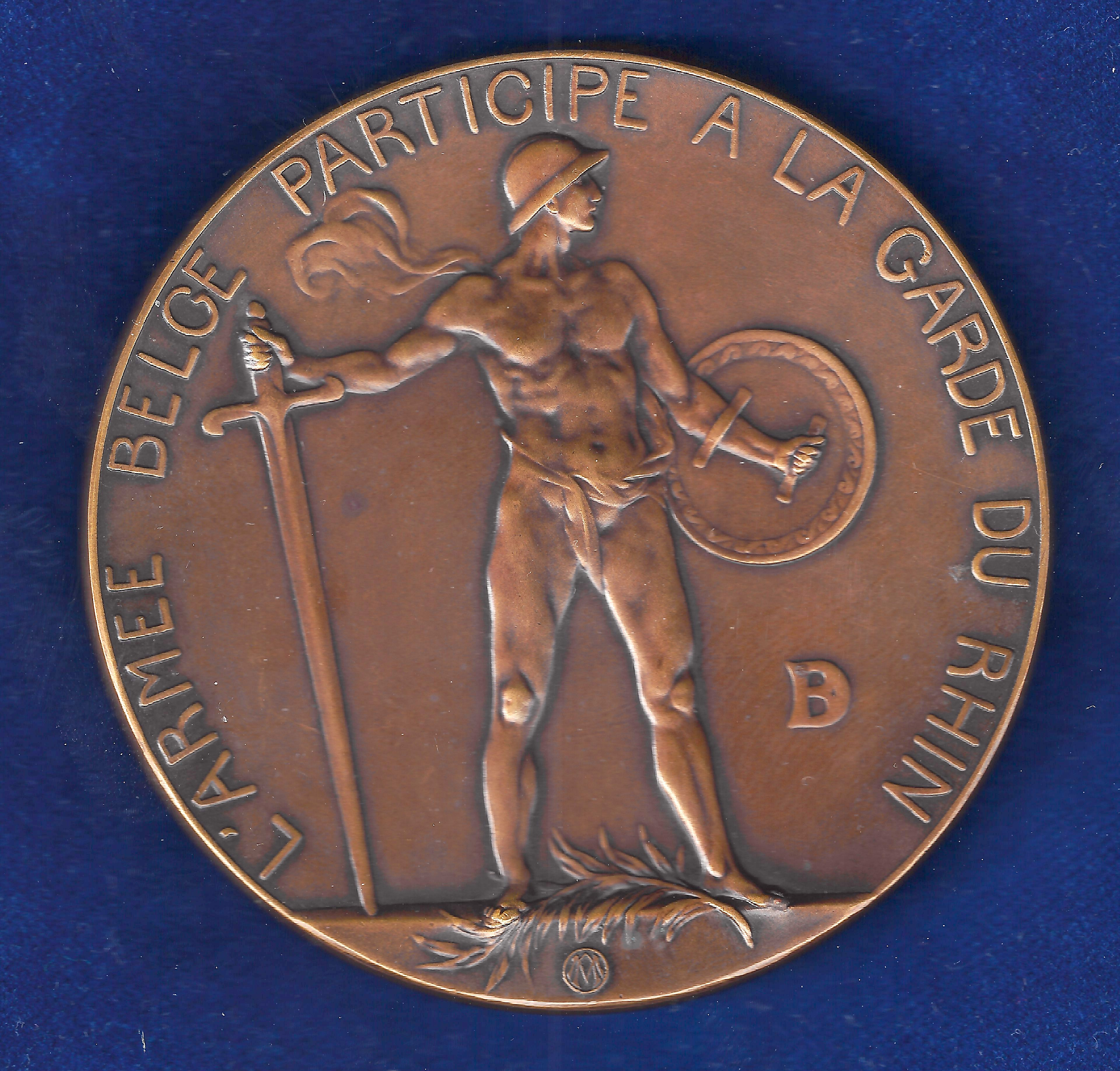
The reverse of the medal showing a Belgian soldier facing east: "The Belgian Army takes part in the guarding of the Rhine"

=== American forces (1918–1923) ===
The United States Army occupied the central area of the Rhineland along the Mosel river and the Koblenz bridgehead. General John J. Pershing, commander of the American Expeditionary Forces (A. E. F.), created the Third Army for the purpose, which in early 1919 comprised some 250,000 men. Command was given to Major General Joseph T. Dickman. The Americans opened their headquarters in a Prussian government building by the Rhine in Koblenz. The U.S. flag flew over Koblenz's Ehrenbreitstein Fortress on the Rhine's east bank.

In July 1919, the Third Army was disbanded and replaced by the American Forces in Germany (AFG) under the command of Major General Henry Tureman Allen. After a steady troop withdrawal, the AFG comprised some 20,000 men in a reduced territory by late 1919. Compared to the situation in the French occupation zone, the Americans' relations with the German population were much better. General Allen took part in saving Ehrenbreitstein Fortress from destruction by the Allied forces in 1922.

On 9 January 1923, under the Warren G. Harding administration, the U.S. Senate passed a resolution withdrawing American forces from Germany. General Allen received the telegram on 10 January. After more than four years of occupation, the last Americans left their headquarters in Koblenz in January 1923. The flag was lowered at Ehrenbreitstein Fortress, the American headquarters, on 24 January. On 27 January American General Allen officially handed over control to the French. On 3 February, the United States withdrew General Allen as its observer from the Inter-Allied Rhineland High Commission. Two weeks later the Americans physically left the Rhineland.

=== Belgian Army of Occupation ===
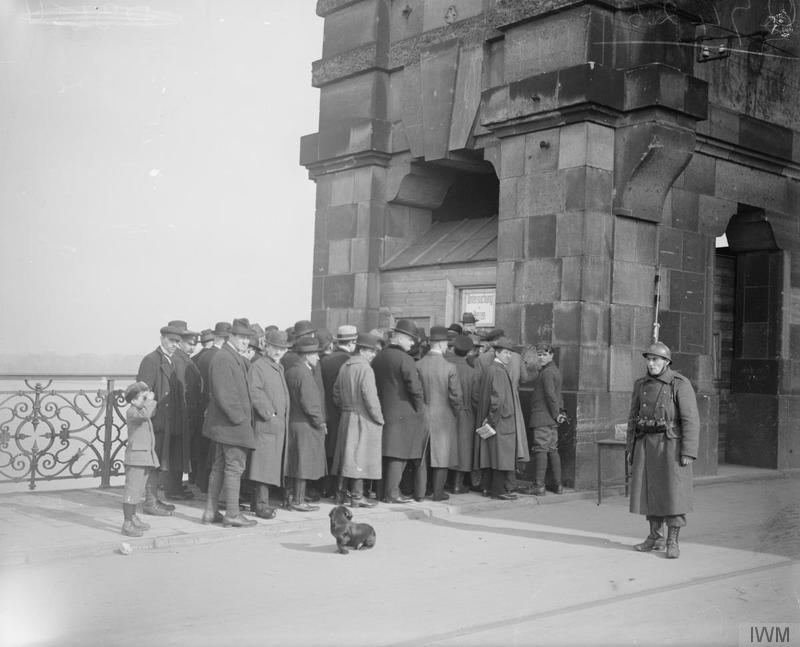
German civilians waiting to be searched for firearms by Belgian soldiers before being allowed to pass over the Oberkassel Bridge

Belgium maintained an army of occupation (Armée d'occupation, AO) in the Rhineland from 1918 to 1929. It consisted of 20,000 soldiers in five divisions with its headquarters at Aachen and its troops stationed in Krefeld. They were commanded by Armand Huyghé. Belgium also participated in the Occupation of the Ruhr in 1923. Eleven Belgian soldiers were killed in an attack on a railway bridge near Hochfeld (today part of Duisburg) on 30 June 1923.

The Belgian Army of Occupation maintained a dedicated security service known as the Military Security Service in Occupied Germany (Sûrété militaire en Allemagne occupée, SMAO) which provided some support to Rhenish separatists. After an officer of the SMOA shot dead a German officer of the Schutzpolizei in March 1921, German police mistakenly killed another Belgian lieutenant named Graff.

=== British Army of the Rhine ===
The British Army entered German territory on 1 December 1918. Cologne was entered on 6 December, and the bridgehead was occupied 12 December. The British Army of the Rhine was established as the occupying force in March 1919. Based at Cologne, they published The Cologne Post. They were withdrawn in January 1926.

=== French Army of the Rhine ===
The French Eighth and Tenth Armies originally constituted the French forces involved in the occupation. The Eighth Army was commanded by General Augustin Gérard and occupied the Palatinate. The Tenth Army was commanded by General Charles Mangin and was responsible for the rest of the French zone from its headquarters in Mainz. On 21 October 1919, they were combined to form the French Army of the Rhine. In 1919, the Italian "Alpi" Brigade was used by the French in occupation duties in the far south of the zone. The French were the last to vacate the occupied Rhineland, on 30 June 1930.

=== Siamese Expeditionary Forces ===
The Siamese Expeditionary Forces participated in the occupation until 1919 with their troops stationed in Neustadt an der Weinstraße, located in the French area.

== See also ==
- Free State of Bottleneck (bottleneck shaped region in the gap between the Mainz and Koblenz bridgeheads east of the Rhine)
- Rhineland Bastard

== Bibliography ==
- Edmonds, J.E. (1987) [1943]. The Occupation of the Rhineland 1918–29. HMSO. ISBN 978-0-11-290454-0.
- Holzheimer, Marc (2019). The American Occupation of the Rhineland, 1918–1923. Independently Published. ISBN 978-1-09-216093-3.
- Pawley, Margaret (2008). The Watch on the Rhine: The Military Occupation of the Rhineland, 1918–1930. I.B.Tauris. ISBN 978-1-84511-457-2.
- Godfroid, Anne (2023). La guerre après la guerre ? l'occupation belge de la rive gauche du Rhin, 1918–1930. Brussels: Éditions de l'Université de Bruxelles. ISBN 978-2800418452.
