= John Stark (disambiguation) =

John Stark (1728–1822) was an American major general during the American Revolution.

John Stark may also refer to:

- John Stark (judge) (1798–?), Scottish lawyer and Queen's Advocate of Ceylon
- John Stark (swimmer) (born 1948), Australian Olympic swimmer
- John Stark (referee) (1865–1932), English football referee
- John Stark (police officer) (c. 1865–1940), British police officer
- John Stillwell Stark (1841–1927), American music publisher
- John Stark (printer) (1779–1849), Scottish printer, author and naturalist
- John Stark (actor), Canadian theatre actor

== See also ==
- Eric John Stark, a character created by the science fiction author Leigh Brackett
- Johnny Stark (1922–1989), French impresario
- Jonathan Stark (disambiguation)
- John Starks (disambiguation)
- Stark (disambiguation)
