= Stark Township =

Stark Township may refer to:

- Stark Township, Brown County, Minnesota
- Stark Township, Hickory County, Missouri

== See also ==
- Starkstown, an early name of Dunbarton, New Hampshire
- Stark (disambiguation)
