= Armand Huyghé =

Belgian Army officer

Chevalier Armand Huyghé de Mahenge
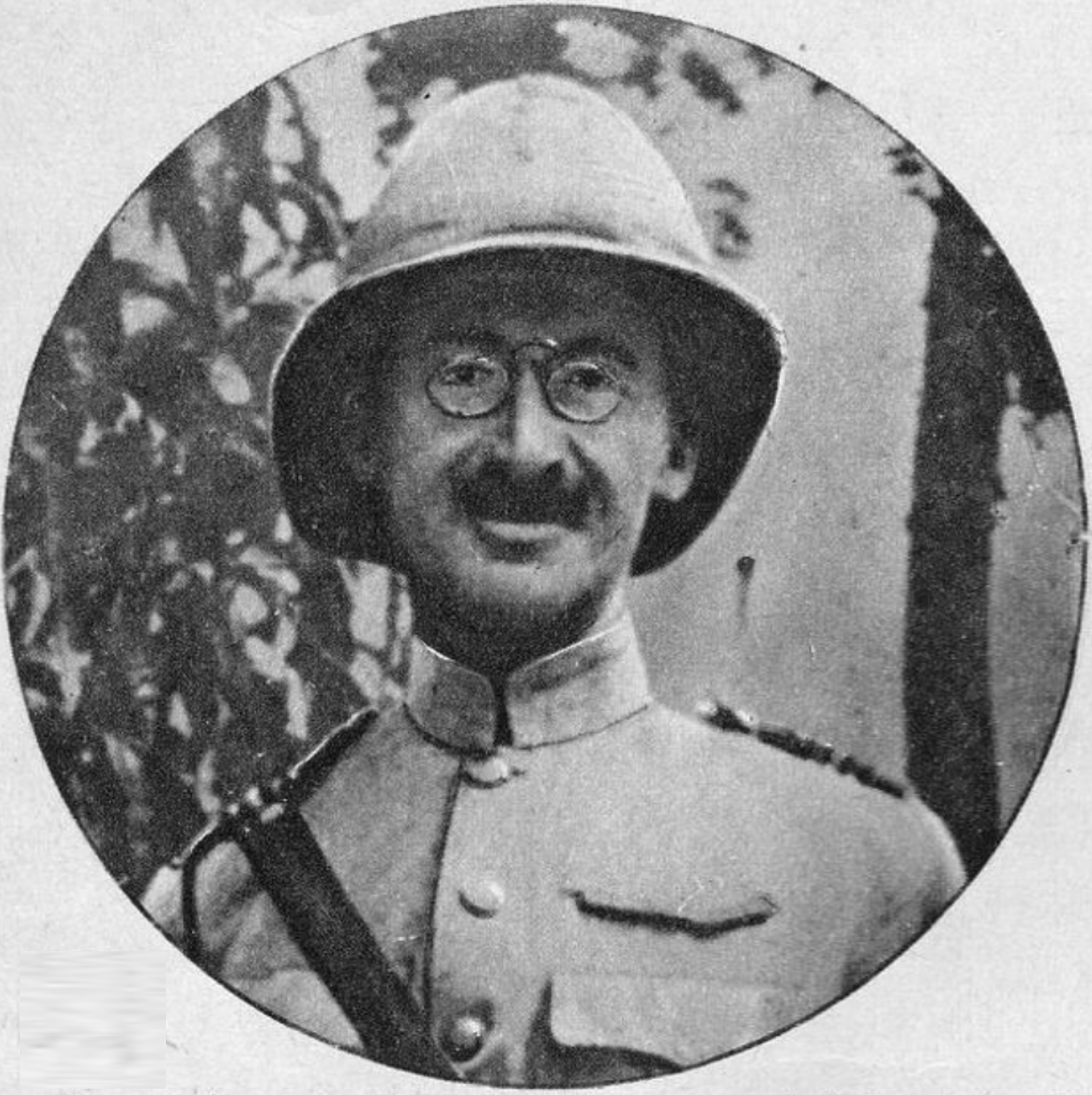
- Born: Armand Christophe Huyghé; 11 July 1871; Leuven, Belgium
- Died: 2 March 1944 (aged 72); Buchenwald concentration camp, Weimar, Nazi Germany
- Military career
- Allegiance: Belgium: Belgian Congo
- Branch: Belgian army Force Publique
- Service years: 1891–1919
- Commands: Belgian army of occupation in Germany
- Conflicts: World War I; German invasion of Belgium; East African Campaign; Tabora Offensive; Mahenge Offensive
- Awards: Order of the African Star; Order of Leopold; Order of Aviz; Order of the Crown of Italy; Order of the Crown

Armand Christophe Huyghé (11 July 1871 – 2 March 1944), later knighted Armand Huyghé de Mahenge, was a Belgian career soldier. He is best known for his service in the Belgian Congo during World War I, where he succeeded Charles Tombeur as commander of the Belgian forces in the East African Campaign in 1917. He commanded the Belgian contingent during the Allied occupation of the Rhineland after the war. During World War II, he was involved in the resistance and, after being captured by the Germans, was deported to Buchenwald concentration camp where he died in 1944.

== Biography ==
Huyghé was born in Leuven in Brabant Province. He studied at the Royal Military Academy and entered the Belgian Army in 1891, serving in the 8th Regiment of the Line, as a junior officer. In 1893, he transferred to the Force Publique, the colonial militia, in the then-Congo Free State which at the time was under the direct personal control of King Leopold II but returned to Belgium soon after, suffering from illness.

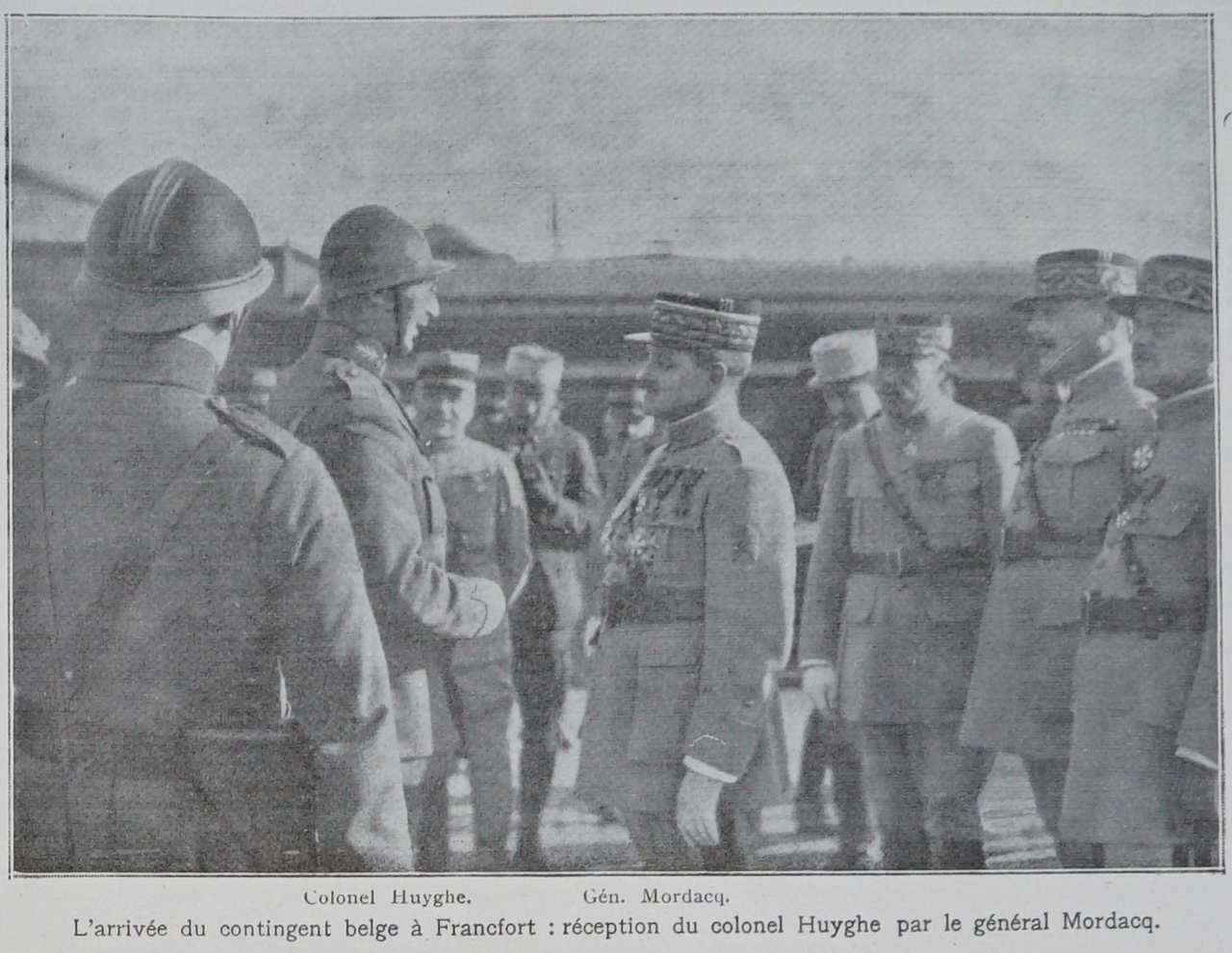
Huyghé (centre-left) meeting French general Henri Mordacq in Frankfurt in 1920 during Huyghé's tenure as commander of the Belgian occupation forces in the Rhineland

At the outbreak of World War I, Huyghé served in the Belgian Army during the German invasion of Belgium, fighting at the Battles of Liège, Antwerp and the Yser in 1914. In 1915, with the front stabilised at the Yser, Huyghé returned to the Belgian Congo to serve in the Force Publique in the East African Campaign. He initially served under Colonel Molitor in the North Brigade (Brigade Nord) during the operations on the frontier of German Ruanda-Urundi and fought at the Battle of Tabora in 1916. Replacing Charles Tombeur as commander of the Force Publique on campaign in February 1917, he commanded the Belgian forces at the important Battle of Mahenge in October 1917.

Returning to Belgium after the war, he commanded the Belgian army of occupation during the Allied occupation of the Rhineland. Retired for ill-health, he held a number of official positions in Belgian companies in the Congo after 1929 on the boards of the Compagnie du chemin de fer du Bas-Congo au Katanga (BCK), Société des mines d'étain du Ruanda-Urundi and the Compagnie des grands élevages congolais. In 1933, he was made a chevalier (knight) by King Albert I in recognition of his role during World War I.

At the time of the fall of Belgium and France in 1940, Huyghé was living in Burgundy and became a local leader in the French resistance. He was arrested in 1943 and detained at Fresnes Prison before being deported to Buchenwald concentration camp, together with the former Belgian prime minister Paul-Émile Janson, where he died of disease in 1944.
