= Jim Stark =

Jim Stark may refer to:

- Jim Stark (Rebel Without a Cause), The protagonist in the film Rebel Without a Cause, played by James Dean
- Jim Stärk, Norwegian pop band

== See also ==
- James Stark (disambiguation)
