= Mahenge offensive =

World War I military action in Africa

- Part of the East African Campaign of World War I
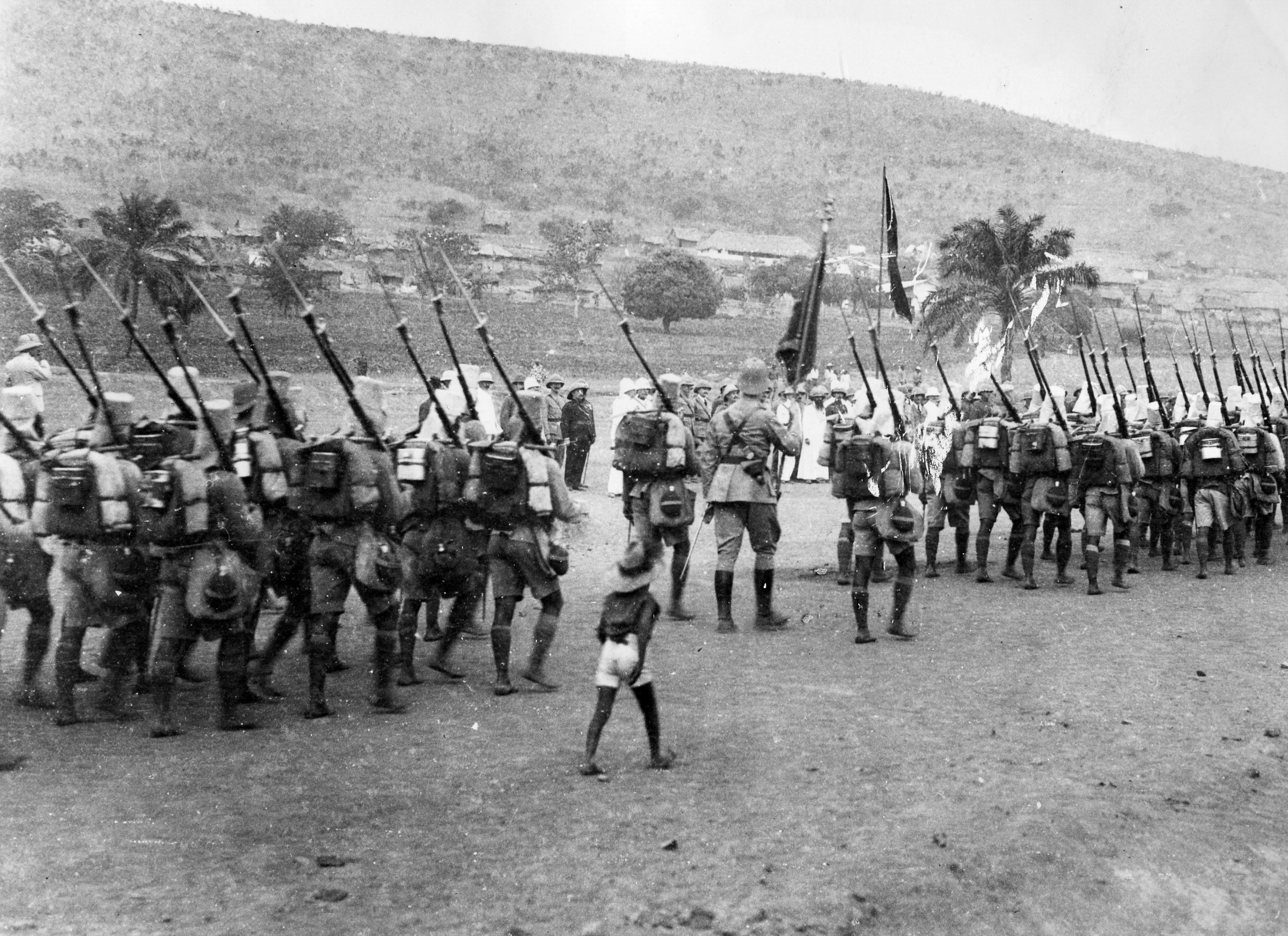
- Belgo-Congolese troops of the Force Publique marching through Kilosa as part of the Mahenge Offensive, July 1917
Date	28 August 1917 – 9 October 1917
Location	Mahenge, German East Africa (modern-day Tanzania) 8°41′S 36°43′E
Result	Allied victory

Belligerents
German Empire: German East Africa	Belgium: Belgian Congo; British Empire: South Africa

Commanders and leaders
(German Empire) Paul von Lettow-Vorbeck	Jacob van Deventer (Belgian Congo) Armand Huyghé
- Location within Tanzania Mahenge offensive (Africa)

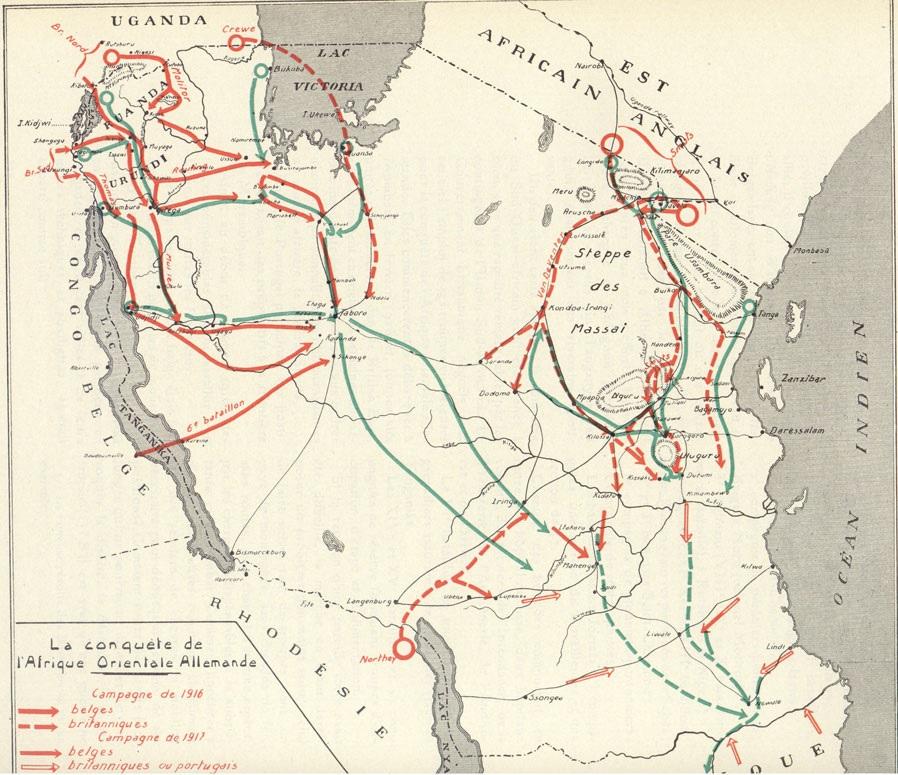
Map of the East African Campaign, 1916-1917.

The Mahenge offensive (French: Offensive sur Mahenge) was a military action which occurred around the Morogoro Region in the east of German East Africa (modern-day Tanzania) during World War I. The combat formed part of the East Africa Campaign and ended with the capture of Mahenge by the Belgian forces on 9 October 1917.

== Prelude ==
Within the framework of the neutral Belgian Congo state, the Force Publique could only adopt a defensive position. This changed on 15 August 1914 when German ships, stationed on Lake Tanganyika, bombed the port of Mokolobu and the Lukuga post a week later.

After the occupation of Ruanda in May 1916 and of Urundi in June 1916, the Belgo-Congolese forces advanced southwards from Kitega along the eastern shore of Lake Tanganyika. On 28 July the Force Publique captured the port of Kigoma, terminus of the strategic railway line from Dar Es Salaam passing through Tabora to Kigoma. On 19 September 1916 the city of Tabora was controlled by Belgian forces.

=== Belgian retreat ===
After the Battle of Tabora the British and Belgian governments agreed that the latter would retreat the majority of its forces to Rwanda and Urundi and to bring its military campaign in German East Africa to a conclusion. This was because of British fears Belgium would stake a claim to the land it had conquered.

== Mahenge Offensive ==
Because of the continued German resistance and their growing experience in guerrilla warfare tactics, the troops of the ‘Force Publique’ were moved to the Dodoma-Kilosa region in July 1917, at the request of the British government. In preparation for the offensive, the Belgian forces conscripted 20,000 men from Ruanda-Urundi to act as porters. At that time the Mahenge area was controlled by 12 German companies under the command of Hauptmann Theodor Tafel. The Belgo-Congolese units advanced on the Mahenge Plateau in September 1917, and Mahenge was captured on 9 October 1917. Captain Tafel withdrew to the south-east. Due to military logistics problems—the rainy season rendered the road from Kilosa to Mahenge unusable, only two Belgian battalions could remain in Mahenge, the rest was sent to the central railway for redeployment to Kilwa and Lindi.

== Aftermath ==
After the Mahenge offensive and the capture of Mahenge in 1917, the Belgian Congolese army controlled roughly one-third of German East Africa. Of the 20,000 Ruanda-Urundian porters utilised in the campaign, two-thirds never returned to their homes. After the war, as outlined in the Treaty of Versailles, Germany was forced to cede "control" of German East Africa to the Allies.

== Works cited ==
- Chrétien, Jean-Pierre (2016). "La guerre de 1914-1918 au Burundi. Le vécu local d'un conflit mondial". Outre-Mers (in French). 1 (390–391): 127–151. doi:10.3917/om.161.0127.
