= Andrew Stark =

Andrew Stark may refer to:

- Andrew Stark (diplomat) (1916–2006), British diplomat
- Andrew Stark (photographer), Australian candid and urban street photographer
