= Jonathan Stark =

Jonathan Stark may refer to:

- Jonathan Stark (tennis) (born 1971), American professional tennis player
- Jonathan Stark (actor) (born 1955), American actor and screenwriter
- Jonathan Stark (basketball) (born 1995), American basketball player

== See also ==
- Jon Snow (character), fictional character, son of Ned Stark
- John Stark (disambiguation)
