= Edward W. Stark =

American politician

Edward W. Stark (December 5, 1869 – January 9, 1935) was an American businessman and politician.

Born in Fish Lake Township, Chisago County, Minnesota, Stark was a merchant and lived in Harris, Minnesota. Stark served as Harris village assessor and treasurer. He also served on the Harris school board and was the board clerk. Stark served as probate judge for Chisago County. From 1901 to 1905, Stark served in the Minnesota House of Representatives and was a Republican. His father Lars Johan Stark also served in the Minnesota State Legislature. From 1925 to 1927, Stark served as Minnesota State Treasurer. Stark died suddenly in Center City, Minnesota while eating dinner.

== Notes ==
Political offices
Preceded by Henry Rines	Treasurer of Minnesota; 1925–1927	Succeeded by Julius A. Schmahl
