= Siam Inter Multimedia =

Thai mass media company

- Native name: บริษัท สยามอินเตอร์มัลติมีเดีย จำกัด (มหาชน)
- Type: Public company
- Traded as: SET: SMM (2005–2019)
- Industry: Mass media
- Predecessor: Siam Comics Co., Ltd.
- Founded: 1990
- Successor: SMM Plus Co., Ltd.
- Headquarters: Bangkok, Thailand,
- Products: Comic books, novels, magazines, sports media
- Brands: Siam Inter Comics; SMM Publishing; SMM Sport
- Services: Publishing, multimedia production, sports news broadcasting
- Parent: Stark Corporation (since 2019)
- Website: www.smm.co.th

Siam Inter Multimedia, operating as SMM Plus Co., Ltd., is a Thai mass media company. It publishes comics and novels through its publishing imprints Siam Inter Comics and SMM Publishing, and operated the sports news network SMM Sport.

The company was established in 1990 as Siam Comics Co., Ltd. before going public as Siam Inter Multimedia Public Company Limited in 2003 and being listed on the Stock Exchange of Thailand in 2005. In 2019, it divested all its operations to newly created subsidiary SMM Plus, as the parent company was acquired as part of a backdoor listing and became Stark Corporation.

Among the company's best known publications was C-Kids, one of the leading Thai-language shonen manga magazines alongside Nation Edutainment's Boom. It was published from 1994 to 2016.
