= Lars Johan Stark =

American politician

Lars Johan Stark (July 27, 1826 – May 5, 1910) was an American farmer, businessman, and politician.

== Biography ==
Born in Västergötland, Sweden, Stark emigrated to the United States in 1850 and settled in Chisago County, Minnesota Territory in 1852. Stark was involved with farming and the mercantile business. He lived in Center City, Minnesota. Stark served as postmaster for Stark, Minnesota. In 1865 and in 1875. Stark served in the Minnesota House of Representatives. His son Edward W. Stark (1869–1935) also served in the Minnesota Legislature. In 1868, he moved to Fish Lake Township, Chisago County, Minnesota and then moved to Harris, Minnesota in 1878. Stark died in Harris, Minnesota. He was buried at Oak Grove Cemetery in Chisago County, Minnesota.
