= James Stark =

James Stark may refer to:

== People ==
- James Stark, pseudonym for Robert Conroy Goldston (born 1927), American historical writer
- James Stark (painter) (1794–1859), English landscape painter
- James Stark (footballer) (born 1880), Scottish footballer
- James Stark (actor) (born 1819), Canadian-born American actor
- James Stark (statistician) FRSE (1811–1890) first Superintendent of Statistics in Scotland
- James H. Stark (1847–1919), British-American author
- James P. Stark (1885–1929), British athlete
- James R. Stark (born 1943), United States Navy admiral

== Fictional characters ==
- James Stark, a vampire in the House of Night series of novels

== See also ==
- Jim Stark (disambiguation)
- James Starks, American football player
