= Adam Stark =

English printer, bookseller and antiquary

Adam Stark (1784–1867) was a printer, bookseller and antiquary, who worked for most of his life in Gainsborough. His father was probably the notable Edinburgh architect William Stark.

== Life ==
Stark was born in Edinburgh on 24 February 1784. In 1804, in partnership with his cousin, John Stark, he became a printer, but the partnership was dissolved in 1810. In conjunction with J. Richardson he published the Hull and Lincoln Chronicle for some time; it afterwards was known as the Lincoln and Hull Chronicle. By 1810 he had moved to Lincoln when he published his The History of Lincoln

In 1810 he became a bookseller at Gainsborough, Lincolnshire, and continued that business until his retirement in 1844.

He died at Gainsborough on 31 December 1867, having married, first, Ann Trotter of Lincoln; secondly, Harriet, daughter of Henry Mozley of Gainsborough, and sister of Anne Mozley, James Bowling Mozley, and of Thomas Mozley; and, thirdly, Sarah Wooton of Newington, Kent.

== Works ==
Stark was the author of:

- The History and Antiquities of Gainsborough, with a Topographical and Descriptive Account of Stow, 1817; another edit. 1841.
- An Account of the Parish of Lea, Lincolnshire, 1841.
- The Visitors' Pocket Guide to Gainsborough and its Neighbourhood, 1849.
- History of the Bishopric of Lincoln, 1852.
- Printing: its Antecedents, Origin, History, and Results, 1855.

== Further Information ==
- English J.S. (1992), Adam Stark, Charles Moor, and Other Historians of Gainsborough in Sturman C. (ed) Some Historians of Lincolnshire, Occasional Papers in Lincolnshire History and Archaeology, No 9. pp82–87.

Attribution

This article incorporates text from a publication now in the public domain: Boase, George Clement (1898). "Stark, Adam". In Lee, Sidney (ed.). Dictionary of National Biography. Vol. 54. London: Smith, Elder & Co. p. 106.
