= John Starks (disambiguation) =

John Starks (born 1965) is an American former basketball player.

John Starks may also refer to:

- John "Jabo" Starks (1938–2018), American drummer from the James Brown band
- John J. Starks (1872-1944) College administrator

== See also ==
- John Stark (disambiguation)
