= British Summary Court =

Court which oversaw the Post-WW1 occupation of the Rhineland

The British Summary Court was a court created by the Treaty of Versailles that sat as part of the Inter-Allied Rhineland High Commission to oversee the occupation of the Rhineland. It lasted ten years, from 1919 to 1929.

== History ==
The court was created by the Treaty of Versailles on 28 June 1919, which created the Inter-Allied Rhineland High Commission to supervise occupied territories and "ensure, by any means, the security and satisfaction of all the needs of the Armies of Occupation". This included the ability to create limited laws and ordinances, and a court was needed to enforce them. From 1919 to 1925 the court sat in Cologne, sitting in Wiesbaden from 1926 until the withdrawal of British forces in 1929.

The court was set up like a magistrate's court, with a barrister presiding as a judge and another barrister acting as a permanent prosecutor. The judge would hold temporary military rank, and would normally act as the sole decider of both fact and sentence; if the potential sentence was more than two years, up to five other officers would also sit as judges. The defendant could be represented by any legal counsel, British or German, and the court could work in both the English and German languages. The court heard 4,295 cases between 1919 and 1925, with possible sentences for minor offences including fines and prison sentences of between seven and fourteen days, normally served in a standard German prison. Most cases were about possessing weapons illegally, straying onto British property, occupying carriages in trains reserved for British officers, reckless driving and possessing British Government property. The courts were well attended by German civilians, and German lawyers also attended to make a study of British legal procedure.

== Wiesbaden years ==
Major H. Gatehouse was the presiding barrister during the period 1926–1929. The court dealt with 595 cases. Of these 54 resulted in acquittal. Most cases involved charges against women for violating deportation orders made by the High Commission. The sentences did not exceed 9 months imprisonment, a sentence which was served in a German prison.

== Bibliography ==
- Carsten, F.L. (1944). "The British Summary Court at Wiesbaden, 1926-1929". Modern Law Review. 7 (4). Blackwell Publishing: 215–220. doi:10.1111/j.1468-2230.1944.tb00986.x. ISSN 0026-7961.
- Edmonds, James (1987). The Occupation of the Rhineland, 1918-1929. HMSO. ISBN 0-11-290454-8.
- Pawley, Margaret (2008). The watch on the Rhine: the military occupation of the Rhineland, 1918-1930. I.B.Tauris. ISBN 978-1-84511-457-2.
