= Nunslinger =

2014 Western novel by Stark Holborn

- Author: Stark Holborn
- Publisher: Hodder & Stoughton
- ISBN: 978-1-444-78923-2

Nunslinger is a 2014 Western novel by pseudonymous British author Stark Holborn, first published in digital format, in 12 installments over 12 months by Hodder, then in print format on completion.

== Format ==
Nunslinger was first published by Hodder as a 12-part digital serial, released in monthly installments over the course of a year before being released in paperback on completion. The Guardian makes the following comment on this unusual means of delivery:

The plot's urgency and tension must owe something to the writing process. I had wondered if the serial publication was merely a way of marketing a finished novel, but no, Nunslinger is being written as we read it, with each instalment turned around in record time by its editors at Hodder.

== Plot ==
Set in the USA in the 1860s, the novel is a first-person account of the story of Sister Thomas Josephine, a Visitandine nun with unusually well-honed survival skills, as she travels across America. Having survived an attack on her wagon train and been accused of a crime she did not commit, Sister Thomas Josephine is forced to go on the run and to team up with a series of outlaws, bandits and undesirables, including the deserter outlaw Abraham Muir, a lovable rogue who tests her faith to the limit. Pursued by the relentless First Lieutenant Theodore F. Carthy, Sister Thomas Josephine - now known as Six Gun Sister - struggles against impossible odds to keep to her principles in a deeply unprincipled world, surviving wars, misadventures, temptations and challenges to her faith on the way.

== Episodes ==
- Nunslinger 1. UK: Hodderscape. 2013. ASIN B00H4EP884.
- Nunslinger 2: The Good, the Bad and the Penitent. UK: Hodderscape. 2013. ASIN B00GIUG3VQ.
- Nunslinger 3: A Pilgrim and a Stranger. UK: Hodderscape. 2013. ASIN B00GIUG5C8.
- Nunslinger 4: The Habits of Strangers. UK: Hodderscape. 2014. ASIN B00FRKPEI6.
- Nunslinger 5: Litany For the Brave. UK: Hodderscape. 2014. ASIN B00FRKPE04.
- Nunslinger 6: The Judgement of Abraham. UK: Hodderscape. 2014. ASIN B00FRKPI8C.
- Nunslinger 7: Westward Order. UK: Hodderscape. 2014. ASIN B00HW2EKOQ.
- Nunslinger 8: The Brother of Bone Orchard. UK: Hodderscape. 2014. ASIN B00HW2EKSW.
- Nunslinger 9: Homily For the Damned. UK: Hodderscape. 2014. ASIN B00HW2EL1I.
- Nunslinger 10: Gospel Sharp. UK: Hodderscape. 2014. ASIN B00J3797E6.
- Nunslinger 11: Ninth-Hour at Noon. UK: Hodderscape. 2014. ASIN B00J379A4S.
- Nunslinger 12: West of Absolution. UK: Hodderscape. 2014. ASIN B00J379548.

== Background ==
Nunslinger is Holborn's first novel, and owes much to the classic penny Western style, although in this case the author set out to subvert the protagonist's traditional gender role. In interview, Holborn has revealed that the novel was partly inspired by Patrick de Witt’s The Sisters Brothers. She describes the deceptively humorous title as 'a 2am post night out joke', which became 'an 180,000 word, twelve novella epic.'

Holborn has also said in interview that a number of characters in Nunslinger are based on historical figures. Benjamin Reasoner is based on Bass Reeves, the first African American deputy west of the Mississippi. Mark Twain inspired a number of characters, and Holborn has said that she often draws inspiration from old maps.

When asked in interview why she was drawn to the traditional Western as a genre, Holborn said:

In its vast journeys, we see the adventure quests of classic Fantasy. In its spirit of frontier discovery coupled with the introduction – and threat – of new technologies, we see two distinct aspects of Science Fiction. The Western can see the Romance of two lost souls in a vast wilderness sit comfortably alongside the gore and brutality of Horror, maybe with the mystery and retribution of Crime thrown in. As a genre, it can be restrictive in that everyone knows what to expect, yet I can't think of another genre that offers such freedom of narrative within its strong set of established conventions. In that way, it's like the frontier itself, setting the dream of limitlessness against the shackles of established reality.

== Reception ==
Described by The Herald as 'a homage to dime novels', and by The Guardian as: 'Witty and atmospheric, with a cliffhanger every few chapters,' Nunslinger was well-received, with critics praising the 'seemingly inexhaustible supply of cliffhangers', and acknowledging the complexity of the protagonist's moral journey.
