= Starck (disambiguation) =

Starck is a German surname.

Starck may also refer to:

- P. A. Starck Piano, an American piano company
- Starck, an aircraft manufacturer

== See also ==
- Stark (disambiguation)
- Stark (surname), including Starke
- Starks (disambiguation)
- Starckdeutsch, an imagined language created by Matthias Koeppel
- Claude and Starck, an American architectural firm
- Edel & Starck, a German television series
