= Stark Holborn =

British writer

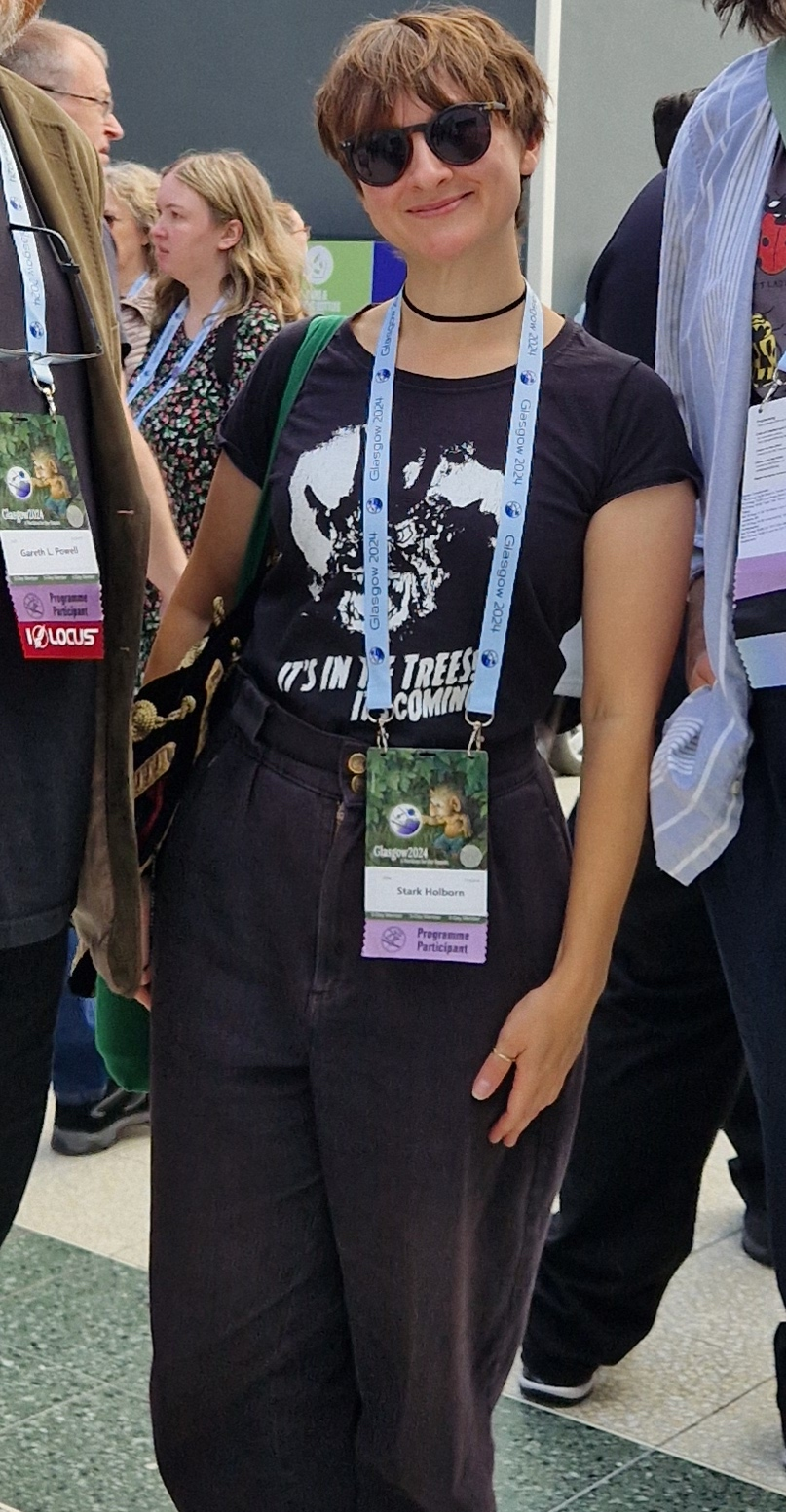
- Holborn at Worldcon 2024 in Glasgow
- Occupation: Writer
- Writing career
- Genres: Sci-fi; Space opera; Space Western
- Notable works: Nunslinger (2014); Triggernometry (2021); The Factus Sequence trilogy (2021–2024)

Stark Fairweather Holborn is a pseudonymous British writer of Westerns and science fiction. She is known for her novel series, Nunslinger (2014) and the British Fantasy Award shortlisted Triggernometry (2021). She was on the judging panel for the Arthur C. Clarke Award in 2021 and 2024.

== Early life ==
Holborn cites influence from Tamora Pierce, J. R. R. Tolkien, Philip K. Dick, Halo Jones, and Alan Garner. She has also cited classic sci-fi films including Aliens and The Thing.

== Career ==
Holborn started writing at 19. After four years of drafting an unpublished book, she began writing Nunslinger. The novel was first published as a series and later in a single volume. The Guardian praised her work as: "Witty and atmospheric, with a cliffhanger every few chapters." She wrote and self published Triggernometry, which was nominated for the British Fantasy Award for Best Novella in 2021. It was followed by Ten Low (2021), and its subsequent sequels Hel's Eight (2023) and Ninth Life (2024).

Holborn is a games writer for the BBC, Cartoon Network and Adult Swim Games, and the lead writer of Shadows of Doubt. In both 2021 and 2024 she was one of the judges for the Arthur C. Clarke Award.

== Themes ==
Themes in Holborn's work include choices, guilt and redemption, and how decision-making becomes harder under duress, as well as the issues of free will and the 'importance of atonement'. There is a strong feminist theme to her work, and a challenging of traditional gender roles. On this topic she says:

Maybe it's because the concept of the frontier has, for so long, been portrayed as a male-dominated space.... Female characters have also been used in the past as shorthand in the concept of manifest destiny: men deal with threats, often violently, clearing the way for women to bring the "civilising" concept of home and procreation to establish the future of a community.

== Reception ==
Holborn's novels have been variously described as Space Westerns, weird fiction, horror, fantasy, and with literary elements. They have been praised for their experimental structure, strong writing and fast-paced style. Publishers Weekly describes Triggernometry as: "a crisply written space western brimming with hard living, villainy, and the search for redemption", and praises Holborn's ability to create "an immersive world". Author Joanne Harris described Hel's Eight as: "a wonderful fusion of Firefly and Joanna Russ, with an Ennio Morricone soundtrack".

== Identity ==
Since the publication of Nunslinger, Holborn's identity has remained elusive. In 2014, The Guardian speculated that the author was probably male, with The Herald making the same assumption. The Irish Times commented on Holborn's mysterious identity, saying: "What is it with creatives from Bristol...? First Banksy, now Stark, hiding their true identities? Mind you, with work this good, who cares?"

== Personal life ==
Holborn lives in Bristol with her partner.

== Bibliography ==
=== Nunslinger ===
- Nunslinger. UK: Hodderscape. 2013. ASIN B00H4EP884.
- Nunslinger 2: The Good, the Bad and the Penitent. UK: Hodderscape. 2013. ASIN B00GIUG3VQ.
- Nunslinger 3: A Pilgrim and a Stranger. UK: Hodderscape. 2013. ASIN B00GIUG5C8.
- Nunslinger 4: The Habits of Strangers. UK: Hodderscape. 2014. ASIN B00FRKPEI6.
- Nunslinger 5: Litany For the Brave. UK: Hodderscape. 2014. ASIN B00FRKPE04.
- Nunslinger 6: The Judgement of Abraham. UK: Hodderscape. 2014. ASIN B00FRKPI8C.
- Nunslinger 7: Westward Order. UK: Hodderscape. 2014. ASIN B00HW2EKOQ.
- Nunslinger 8: The Brother of Bone Orchard. UK: Hodderscape. 2014. ASIN B00HW2EKSW.
- Nunslinger 9: Homily For the Damned. UK: Hodderscape. 2014. ASIN B00HW2EL1I.
- Nunslinger 10: Gospel Sharp. UK: Hodderscape. 2014. ASIN B00J3797E6.
- Nunslinger 11: Ninth-Hour at Noon. UK: Hodderscape. 2014. ASIN B00J379A4S.
- Nunslinger 12: West of Absolution. UK: Hodderscape. 2014. ASIN B00J379548.
- Nunslinger. UK: Hodderscape. 2014. ISBN 978-1444789232. Omnibus Edition

=== Triggernometry ===
- Triggernometry. UK: Rattleback Books. 2020. ASIN B086JXRSZK.
- Advanced Triggernometry. UK: Rattleback Books. 2021. ASIN B08Y5PW5H2.
- Triggernometry Finals. UK: Rattleback Books. 2025. ASIN B0DT6S5PW5.

=== Factus Sequence ===
- Ten Low. UK: Titan. 2021. ISBN 978-1789096620.
- Hel's Eight. UK: Titan. 2023. ISBN 978-1803362298.
- Ninth Life. UK: Titan. 2024. ISBN 978-1803362984.

=== Other works ===
- Nightfall on Stygies. Black Library. 2025. ISBN 978-1-83609-230-8.
