= Starkes =

Starkes is a surname. Notable people with the surname include:

- Harold Starkes, Canadian businessman and politician, son of Roland
- Roland G. Starkes, Newfoundland businessman and politician

== See also ==
- Leinthall Starkes, Herefordshire, England
