= Kraft (surname) =

Kraft is a German surname that means "strength", "power". Notable people with the surname include:

- Adam Kraft (c. 1455–1509), German sculptor
- Anders Kraft (born 1968), Swedish journalist and news anchor
- Antonín Kraft (1749–1820), Czech cellist and composer
- Charles H. Kraft (born 1932), anthropologist
- Christopher C. Kraft, Jr. (1924–2019), NASA flight director
- Eric Kraft (born 1944), American author
- Hannelore Kraft (born 1961), Prime Minister of North Rhine-Westphalia
- Herbert C. Kraft (1927–2000), American archaeologist
- James L. Kraft (1874–1953), founder of Kraft Foods
- Jens Edvard Kraft (1784–1853), Norwegian literary historian
- Jens Kraft (1720–1765), Norwegian mathematician
- Josef Kraft (1921–1994), Austrian-born military aviator
- Jüri Kraft (1935–2023), Estonian economist and politician
- Kathinka Kraft (1826–1895), Norwegian memoirist
- Leo Kraft (1922–2014), American composer, author, and educator
- Mary L. Kraft, American bioengineering professor
- Michelle Kraft (born 1989), German politician
- Milan Kraft (born 1980), Czech ice hockey player
- Nikolaus Kraft (1778-1853), Austrian cellist and composer
- Nina Kraft (1968–2020), German triathlete
- Norbert Kraft (born 1950), Canadian guitarist
- Ole Bjørn Kraft (1893–1980), Danish journalist and politician
- Pat Kraft, American college athletics administrator
- Rainer Kraft (football manager) (born 1962), German football manager
- Rainer Kraft (politician) (born 1974), German politician
- Randy Steven Kraft (born 1945), American serial killer
- Robert Kraft (born 1941), American football executive
- Robert Kraft (astronomer) (1927–2015), American astronomer
- Stefan Kraft (born 1993), Austrian ski jumper
- Thomas Kraft (born 1988), German football player
- Tucker Kraft (born 2000), American football player
- Victor Kraft (1880–1975), Austrian philosopher, member of the Vienna Circle
- Waldemar Kraft (1898-1977), German politician
- William Kraft (1923–2022), American composer
