= John Stark (printer) =

Scottish printer, author and naturalist

John Stark of Huntfield FRSE FSSA (1779–1849) was a 19th-century Scottish printer, author and naturalist.

== Life ==
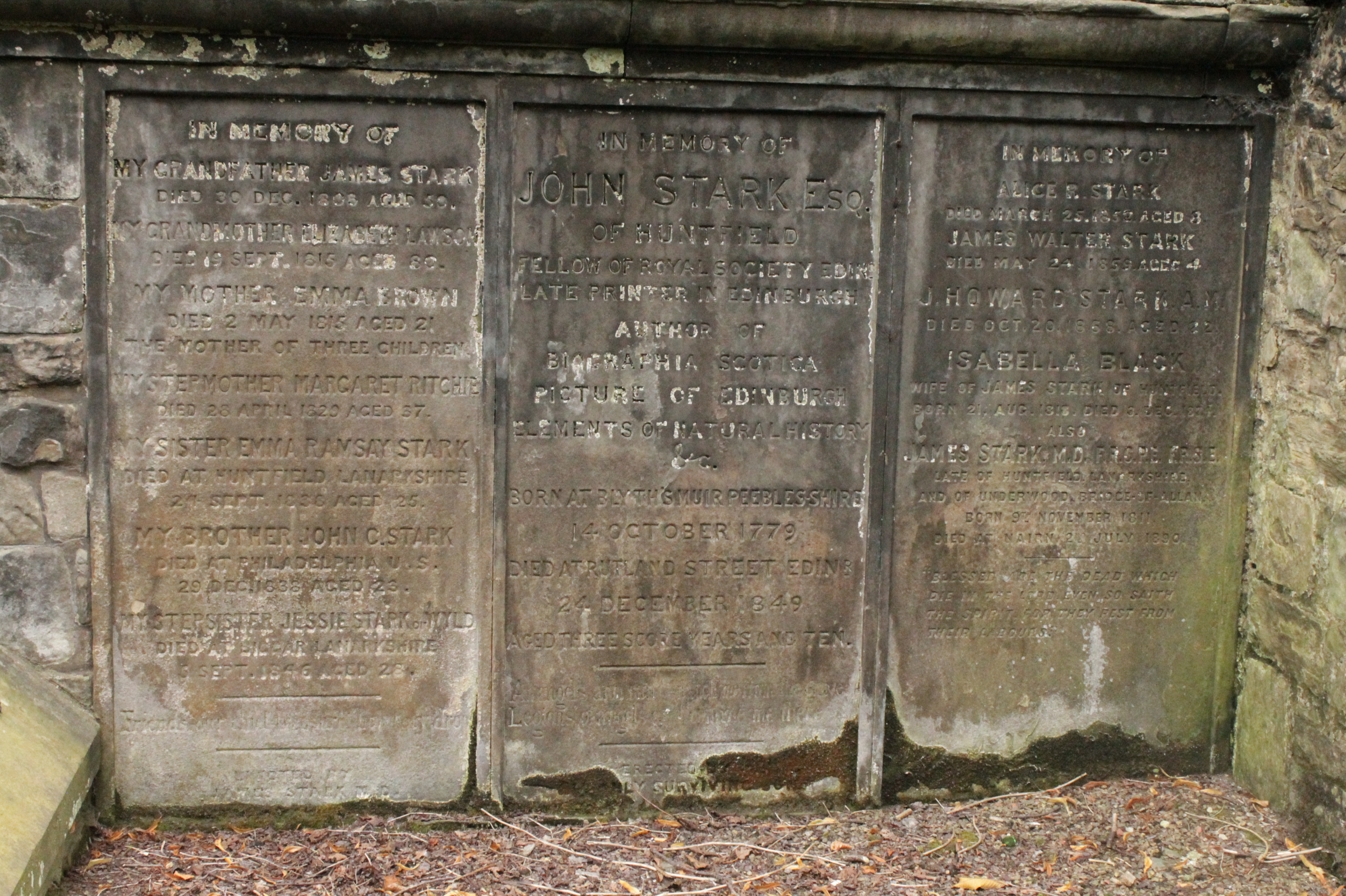
The grave of John Stark FRSE, St Cuthbert's Churchyard, Edinburgh

He was born on 14 October 1779 in Blyth's Muir in Peeblesshire the son of James Stark, and his wife, Elizabeth Lawson. He was educated in small schools in Edinburgh: first my Mr Barrie then Mr McIntyre on College Wynd. His time here id thought to have brought about the inspiration for Walter Scott's character: Dominie Sampson. He also began a life-long friendship with Dugald Stewart.

He moved to Edinburgh in 1803 and had premises at 4 North College Street. In 1805 he set up a printworks at the Netherbow Port on the Royal Mile. By 1810 he was living at a house on Carrubbers Close on the Royal Mile. The following year he moved to 2 Bristo Street in the South Side. He then moved consequetively to: 54 Bristo St (1811); Writers Court (1812/13); Fishmarket Close (1814–19); and Brown Square (1820-1825).

In 1826 he was elected a Fellow of the Royal Society of Edinburgh, the proposer being Sir David Brewster. He served as assistant curator to the Society's museum from 1829 to 1849.

He died at his son's house, 21 Rutland Square, on Christmas Eve 24 December 1849. He is buried nearby in St Cuthbert's Churchyard at the west end of Princes Street Gardens. The grave lies attached to the outer north wall of the church.

== Family ==
He was married to Emma Wood (d.1815). Following her death he married Margaret Ritchie (d.1829).

His children included James Stark.

His cousin was the printer Adam Stark.

== Publications ==
- Biographica Scotica (Scottish Biographical Dictionary) (1805)
- Picture of Edinburgh (1806)
- Elements of Natural History, Adapted to the Present State of the Science (1828)
- Edinburgh's Royal Days Entertainments (1822)
- The Second Voyage of Omai the Traveller (1822)
