= Paul Tirard =

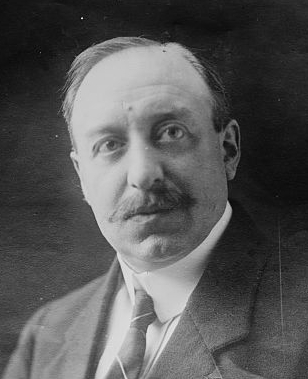
- Born: 2 June 1879; Nogent-le-Rotrou
- Died: 23 December 1945 (aged 66); Paris, France
- Occupation: Chairman of the Inter-Allied Rhineland High Commission.

Paul Tirard (2 June 1879 – 23 December 1945) was chairman of the Inter-Allied Rhineland High Commission from 1919 to 1930.

== Biography ==
He was born in Nogent-le-Rotrou on 2 June 1879 into a family of industrialists, son of Ferdinand Tirard.

He studied law (docteur en droit de la Faculté de Paris in 1906) before becoming a career civil servant. In 1912 he was involved in setting up the colonial administration of the French Protectorate of Morocco. Président in 1943 of the Académie des Sciences Morales et Politiques.

He died on 23 December 1945 in Paris, France (17ème arrondissement), 8 rue Anatole de La Forge and was bachelor.

In October 1947 a French school, the Lycée Français Paul Tirard, was established in Mainz.

== Bibliography ==
- Tirard, Paul (1930). La France sur le Rhin. Paris: Plon.
- Tirard, P. (1930) L'Art français de Rhine pendant l'Occupation 1918–1930. Strasbourg:
- Pawley, Margaret (2007). The Watch on the Rhine: The Military Occupation of the Rhineland, 1918–1930. I.B.Tauris. ISBN 978-1-84511-457-2.
- Jardin, P., (1989) 'La politique rhénane de Paul Tirard (1920–1923)', in Revue d'Allemagne 21, pp. 208–216.
