= James Stark (statistician) =

Scottish physician (1811–1890)

James Stark of Huntfield FRSE FRCPE FSSA (9 November 1811–2 July 1890) was a 19th-century Scottish physician who became the first Superintendent of Statistics in Scotland. He created the concept of vital statistics in 1854.

== Life ==
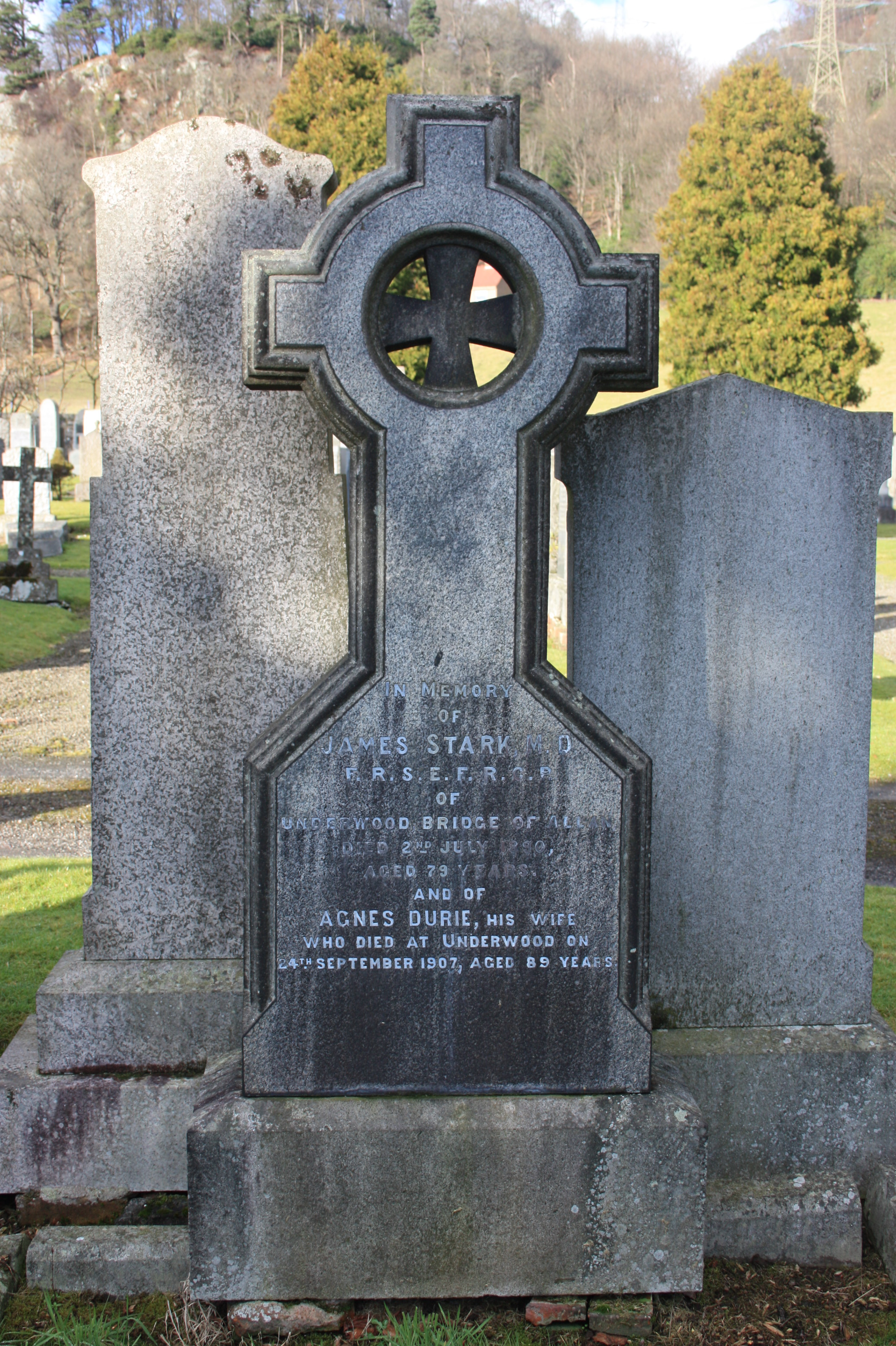
The grave of James Stark, Logie Kirk churchyard

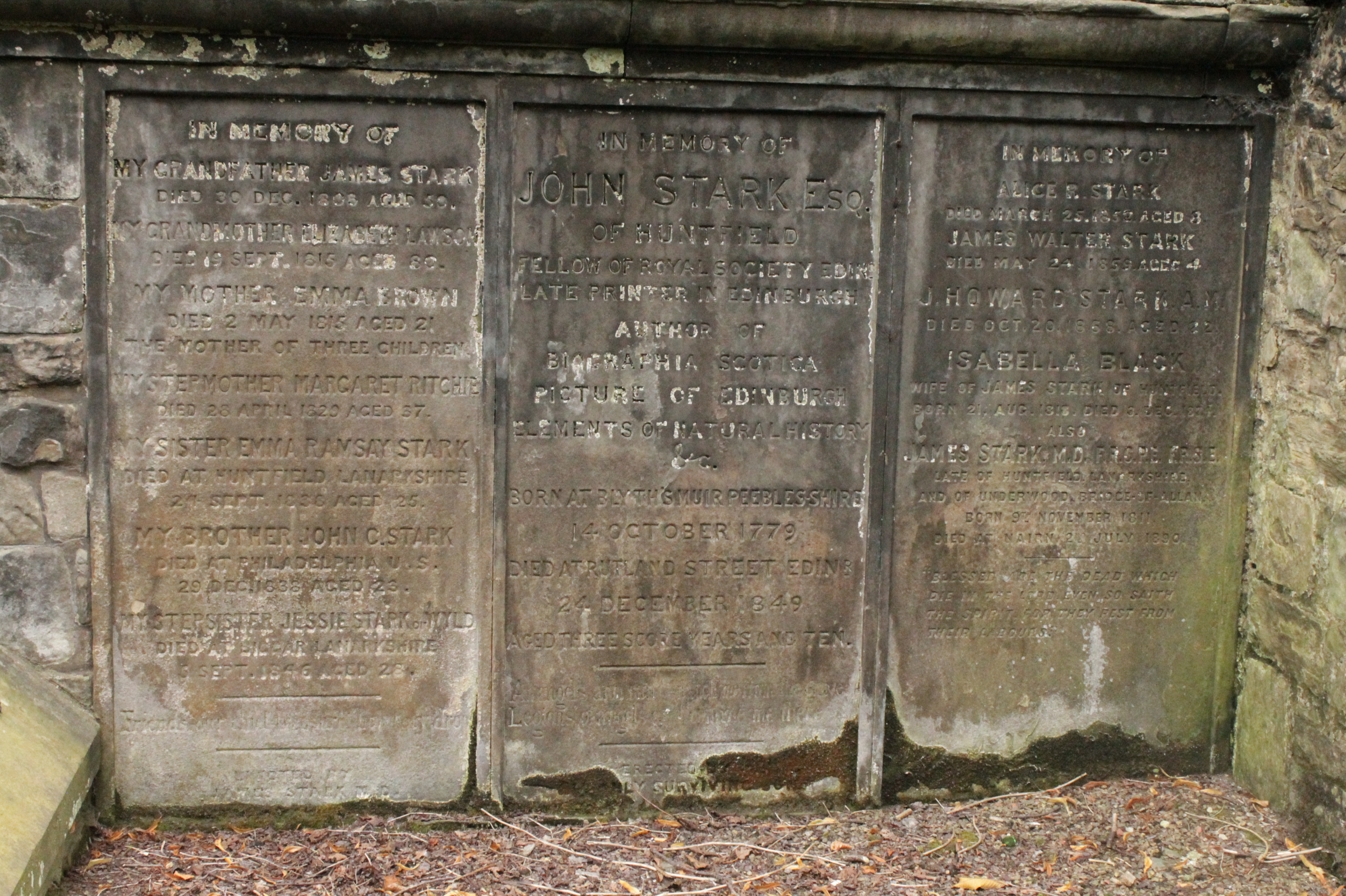
Stark memorial, St Cuthbert's Churchyard, Edinburgh

He was born on 9 November 1811 at 2 Bristo Street in Edinburgh's South Side, the son of Emma Brown (d.1815) and her husband, John Stark.

He studied medicine at the University of Edinburgh, and undertook postgraduate studies in Paris and Bonn gaining his doctorate (MD) from Edinburgh in 1833. He then set up as a GP in the city at 21 Rutland Street in the West End of the city. In 1839 he became a Fellow of the Royal College of Physicians of Edinburgh and became Curator of their museum.

In 1842 he was elected a Fellow of the Royal Society of Edinburgh, the proposer being his father.

In 1854, following the passing of the Scottish Registration Act, William Pitt Dundas in his role as Registrar General for Scotland, requested that the government fund a Superintendent of Statistics; preferably of medical background. The Royal College of Physicians of Edinburgh put forward Dr James Stark. He thereafter worked for the General Register Office of Scotland. He held the role until retiral in 1873, still living at 21 Rutland Street.

He died at Underwood House in Bridge of Allan on 2 July 1890. He is buried nearby in Logie Kirk. The grave lies to the north-east of the church. He is also memorialised on his parents' grave in St Cuthbert's Churchyard in central Edinburgh, at the west end of Princes Street Gardens. The memorial lies against the outer north wall of the church.

== Family ==
He was married to Isabella Black (1815-1874). Following her death he married Agnes Durie (1818-1907).
