= Sebastian Stark (politician) =

Austrian politician (born 2000)

Member of the Federal Council
- Incumbent
- Assumed office 12 June 2025
- Appointed by: Landtag of Lower Austria

Personal details
- Born: 18 April 2000 (age 25)
- Party: People's Party

Sebastian Stark (born 18 April 2000) is an Austrian politician serving as a member of the Federal Council since 2025. He has served as chairman of the Young People's Party in Lower Austria since 2023.
