= Stark Building =

- U.S. National Register of Historic Places
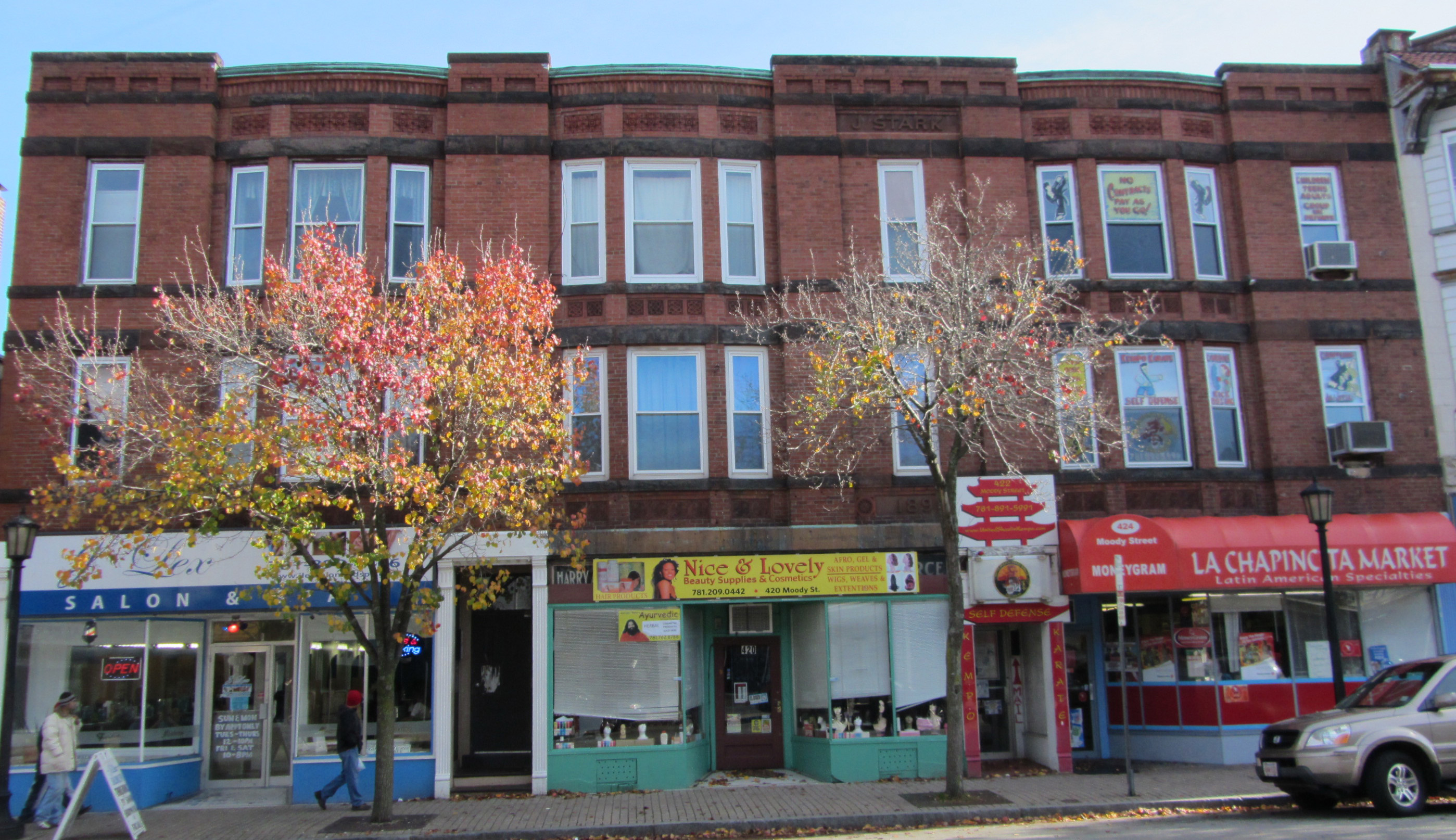

- Location within Massachusetts Location within the United States
- Location: 416–424 Moody St., Waltham, Massachusetts
- Coordinates: 42°22′8.4″N 71°14′13.4″W
- Built: 1891
- Architectural style: Queen Anne
- MPS: Waltham MRA
- NRHP reference No.: 89001542
- Added to NRHP: September 28, 1989

The Stark Building is a historic commercial building in Waltham, Massachusetts. The three-story brick building was built in 1891 by John Stark Jr., the owner of a successful manufacturer of watchmaking tools. It is one of Waltham's few surviving and well-preserved Queen Anne commercial buildings, having only received significant alteration to its storefronts. The building was listed on the National Register of Historic Places in 1989.

== Description and history ==
The Stark Building is located on the east side of Moody Street, between Cushing and Chestnut Streets. Moody Street is a major north–south artery, and the principal commercial area on the city's south side. The building is three stories tall, built of brick with brownstone trim. Piers separate either individual or tripled windows, and there are decorative terra cotta panels set between the levels above and below the windows.

The building was built in 1891 by John Stark Jr., the son of a Scottish immigrant who established a business manufacturing lathes specialized for the production of watches. The younger Stark took over his father's business, and expanded into real estate with the construction of this building in front of his father's shop. It is one of the few large buildings on Moody Street to survive from the 19th century. Stark was also a partner in the Waltham Clock Company, which was eventually absorbed by the Waltham Watch Company.

== See also ==
- National Register of Historic Places listings in Waltham, Massachusetts
