= Henri Mordacq =

French general

Jean Jules Henri Mordacq
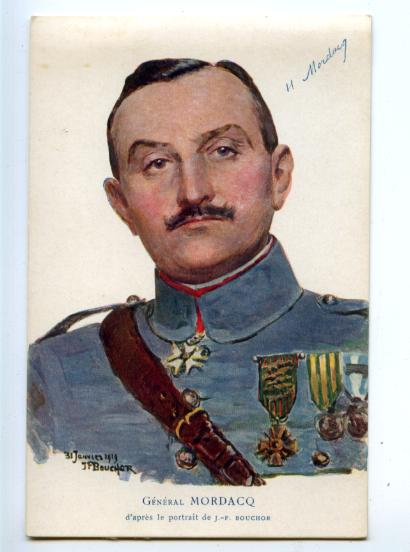
- Born: 12 January 1868 Clermont-Ferrand
- Died: 14 April 1943 (aged 75) Paris

Jean Jules Henri Mordacq (12 January 1868 – 14 April 1943) was a French general. During his early years as a captain he was the sabre champion of the French Army's officer corps. In World War I, he was a frontline commander of initially the 159th Regiment of Alpine Infantry, then the 90th Brigade, and finally the 24th Infantry Division, in the process being wounded twice on the battlefield. In 1918 and the Paris Peace Conference, he was a close aide to Clemenceau.

== Early career ==
Mordacq's military career began as a lieutenant in French Algeria before joining the Foreign Legion's 1st Foreign Regiment in French Indochina in 1893. Fighting off the remaining pirates in Tonkin, he became an intelligence officer during the Colonnes du Nord in 1896 where he met Joseph Gallieni and Hubert Lyautey. He returned to Algeria for a year and then studied in Paris at the École de guerre to become a staff officer. He then became known for his military writing advocating reforms from the military schools to tactical warfare. He became chief of staff of Georges Picquart's 10th Infantry Division. When Picquart became Secretary of War in Clemenceau's first Government in 1906, he became very influential as Picquart's right hand. He pushed for the nomination of former mentor Ferdinand Foch at the head of the École de guerre before becoming an instructor there in 1910. He gave there the first strategy course in France known as the Cours des maréchaux for it was only open to the top fifteen students at the École de guerre. He came back to the Office of war promoting further reforms. Then Secretary and former comrade at Saint-Cyr Adolphe Messimy nominated him Director-in-second and head of the military classes at the École spéciale militaire de Saint-Cyr in 1912. He trained the future lieutenants and captains who would lead the French units in combat at the start of World War I.

== First World War ==
=== 1914 ===
In August 1914, Mordacq was chief of staff of general Archinard's 1st Reserve Corps Group in the Eastern Army. When the Germans breached the French lines through Belgium, he asked for a frontline command and became commander of the famous 159th Regiment of Alpine Infantry. He immediately partook in the Battle of the Frontiers and his regiment participated in ending the German advance in the Vosges before the First Battle of the Marne led to the Race to the Sea. He then took command of the defence of Arras, the key to the sea and again halted the German advance there, which led to the front's stabilisation and the start of trench warfare.

=== 1915 ===
Promoted to colonel, he took command of the 90th Brigade, within 45th Infantry Division (France), which witnessed on 22 April 1915 the first chemical attack in history. His troops stood firm in the following weeks and retook lost ground.

=== 1916 ===
He was made général de brigade in 1916 and led the 24th Infantry Division, which fought in the Battle of Verdun and the Battle of the Somme.

=== 1917 ===
In early 1917, he led his division in the Champagne region and threw back the Germans back to their lines before the Chemin des Dames attack.

He was to command an infantry corps in Italy but was called in early November 1917 to become the military chief of staff in Clemenceau's second government in what was to be nicknamed the Ministère de la Victoire.

== In government ==
He proved himself essential to the French command's reorganisation and was Clemenceau's influential right-hand man (his main military advisor) from 1917 to 1920, thus participating extensively in the Allied victory of 1918.

In January 1920, he became commander of the 30th Infantry Corps occupying in Rhineland in Wiesbaden. He remained at his command until 1925 when he left the army, resenting the contemporary political and military leaders who alienated him for his criticism of the appeasement policy toward Germany and for his unrelenting loyalty to Clemenceau in 1920.

== Retirement ==
From 1925 to his death in 1943, Mordacq wrote more than twenty books and published dozens of articles in influential reviews to promote Clemenceau and his actions in the troubled days from November 1917 to 1920, explaining the choices and reforms which were made in order to achieve military and political victory.

He criticised former friend Philippe Pétain's promulgation of racial laws in 1940. Mordacq was found dead in the Seine under the Pont des Arts on 12 April 1943. The authorities at the time claimed this was the result of suicide.

His last literary work on World War I, part 4 in the series "The Great Hours of War", titled, "1917, The Year of Anguish", was released just after the onset of World War II, in 1940.

== Works (titles translated from French) ==
- Mordacq, Captaine, The War in Morocco: Tactical Lessons of the two Franco-Moroccan (1884) and Spanish-Moroccan (1859-1860) Wars, Paris: Lavauzelle, 1896
- Mordacq, Captaine, "Pacification of Upper Tonkin: History of the last military operations, Northern Columns (1895-1896)", Paris: Chapelat, 1901
- Mordacq, Captaine, "The officer in the new army: his professional training", Paris: Lavauzelle, 1906
- Mordacq, Captaine (pseudonym Jibé Gal), "The New Army, what it thinks, what it wants", Paris, Plon, 1906
- Mordacq, Commandant, The War in Africa: Big Columns Tactics, Lessons from the Expedition against the Beni Snassen (1859), Paris: Chapelat, 1908
- Mordacq, Commandant, "The Fighting Cyclists", Paris: L. Fournier, 1910
- Mordacq, Commandant, "The Strategy: Historical Evolution", Paris: Fournier, 1912
- Mordacq, Commandant, "Strategic Trials: The Duration of the Next War", Paris: Levrault, 1912 (extract from "The General Military Review")
- Mordacq, Commandant, "A lived strategic situation: the prodromes of Moukden", Paris: Berge-Levrault, 1912 (extract from "The General Military Review")
- Mordacq, Lieutenant-Colonel, "The Sudanese Cavalry Soldier", Paris: Lavauzelle, 1912
- Mordacq, Lieutenant-Colonel, "Politics and Strategy in a Democracy", Paris: Plon, 1912
- Mordacq, Lieutenant-Colonel, "War in the 20th century, strategic essays", Paris: Berger-Levrault, 1914
- Mordacq, Lieutenant-Colonel, "Military Life in France and Abroad: The Officer in the 20th Century", Paris: Alcan, 1914
- Mordacq, Général H., "The German mentality; five years in command on the Rhine", Paris: Plon, 1925
- Mordacq, Général H., "Evacuation of the Rhineland?", Paris: Tallandier, 1928
- Mordacq, Général, "Unity of Command: How it Was Achieved", Paris: Tallandier, 1929
- Mordacq, Général, "The World War, lived pages. The Truth About the Armistice", Paris: Tallandier, 1929
- Mordacq, Général, "Could the armistice be signed in Berlin?...", Paris: Grasset, 1930
- Mordacq, Général, "The Clemenceau ministry, diary of a witness" (4 vol.), Paris: Plon, 1931
- Mordacq, Général, "Clemenceau at the end of his life, 1920-1929" (2 vol.), Paris: Plon, 1933
- Mordacq, Général, "The drama of the Yser; the gas surprise" (April 1915)", Paris: Éditions des Portiques, 1933
- Mordacq, Général H., "The Truth About One Command", Paris: Éditions Albert, 1934
- Mordacq, Général H., "Why Arras was not taken (1914)", Paris: Plon, 1934
- Mordacq, Général, "The Lessons of 1914 and the Next War", Paris: Flammarion, 1934
- Mordacq, Général H., "Should we change the government?", Paris: Michel, 1935
- Mordacq, Général H., "Legends of the Great War", Paris: Flammarion, 1935
- Mordacq, Général (as Preface), "The 25th, 65th and 106th Infantry Battalions during the Great War", Paris: Caudron, 1936
- Bismarck, Otto von (with Henri Mordacq as Preface), "Bismarck's Political Testament", Paris: Corrêa, 1937
- Mordacq, Général H., "The armistice of November 11, 1918. Account of a witness", Paris: Plon, 1937
- Mordacq, Général H., "The Great Hours of War, 1914 (vol. 1), The War of Movement", Paris: Plon, 1938
- Mordacq, Général H., "National Defense in Danger", Paris: Les Éditions, 1938
- Mordacq, Général H., "The Great Hours of War, 1915 (vol. 2), Trench Warfare", Paris: Plon, 1939
- Mordacq, Général H., "The Great Hours of War, 1916 (vol. 3), Verdun", Paris: Plon, 1939
- Mordacq, Général H., "A Great Polish Victory", Paris: Atlas, 1939
- Mordacq, Général H., "Clemenceau", Paris: Les Éditions de France, 1939
- Mordacq, Général H., "The Great Hours of War, 1917 (vol. 4), The Year of Anguish", Paris: Plon, 1940
