= Andrew Stark (photographer) =

Australian street photographer

- Born: Andrew David Stark; 23 January 1964 (age 62); Sydney, Australia
- Education: Newington College
- Known for: Street photography

Andrew David Stark (born 23 January 1964) is an Australian candid and urban street photographer active since the early 1980s.

== Early life and education ==
Stark was born in New South Wales and grew up in the then semi-rural district of Liverpool before moving with his family in the 1970s to Strathfield, a suburb in the Inner West of Sydney. In 1981 he completed the Higher School Certificate at the Uniting Church and GPS affiliated independent boys school Newington College.

== Life and work ==
In 2003, his first book, Snaps from Sydney, was self-published. A second, Candidly Inclined, followed in 2005. From September 2006 to February 2007 an exhibition of his work, Starkers, was held at the Museum of Sydney. Throughout 2007, Stark documented the Sutherland Shire district, known for the 2005 Cronulla race riots, and the resulting exhibit Down South was commissioned and shown at Hazelhurst Gallery, Sydney in late 2008. A third book, Escaping into Life: A psycho study of the contemporary street photographer was self-published in 2010. A review of his work in Black+White magazine stated, "Stark's idiomatic and wryly observed urban photographs of Sydney, Australia, represent a vital continuation of documentary street photography, reflecting similar social concerns and the same aesthetic irony as Robert Frank, William Klein and Garry Winogrand." In 2019 he published Here come the townies: The early history of Gosford Rugby League: 1890–1950.

He works in black and white using a Konica TC film camera and a 28 or 40 mm lens. "He is drawn in by the emotions of his subjects – a fleeting look of vulnerability, a spontaneous burst of joy, or the blank stare of melancholy."

During early 2024, and after a hiatus of 15 years, Stark began once again photographing on the streets of Sydney. Working for the first time in colour he commenced publication of the online journal, Sydney Street Magazine which shows his new work alongside his earlier black and white images (1980–2011).

== Personal life ==
He lives on the Central Coast of New South Wales.

== Publications ==
- Snaps from Sydney. Heathcote, NSW: self-published, 2003. ISBN 0958198004.
- Candidly Inclined: The Photography of Andrew Stark. Heathcote, NSW: self-published, 2005. ISBN 0958198012.
- Escaping into Life: A Psycho Study of the Contemporary Street Photographer. Sydney: self-published, 2010. ISBN 9780958198028.
- Here Come the Townies: The Early History of Gosford Rugby League: 1890–1950. East Gosford: self-published, 2019. ISBN 9780958198035.
