= Stark, Minnesota =

Unincorporated community in Minnesota, United States

Stark
- Unincorporated community
- Location within Minnesota Location within the United States
- Coordinates: 45°34′50″N 93°03′38″W
- Country: United States
- State: Minnesota
- County: Chisago County
- Township: Fish Lake Township
- Elevation: 968 ft (295 m)
- Time zone: UTC-6 (Central (CST))
  - Summer (DST): UTC-5 (CDT)
- ZIP code: 55032
- Area code: 651
- GNIS feature ID: 652562

Stark is an unincorporated community in Fish Lake Township, Chisago County, Minnesota, United States.

Chisago County Roads 8 and 10 are two of the main routes in the community. Nearby places include Harris, North Branch, Rush Point, and Spring Lake. Stark is located within ZIP code 55032 based in Harris.

A post office called Stark was established in 1868, and remained in operation until it was discontinued in 1904. Lars Johan Stark, the first postmaster, gave the community its name.
