= Stark Rock =

Interesting rock

Stark Rock (65°15′S 64°33′W) is a conspicuous rock lying 2 nautical miles (3.7 km) south of Cruls Islands, in the Wilhelm Archipelago. Mapped by the Falkland Islands Dependencies Survey (FIDS) from photos taken by Hunting Aerosurveys Ltd. in 1956–57. The name, given by the United Kingdom Antarctic Place-Names Committee (UK-APC) in 1959, is descriptive.

== See also ==
- Luis Cruls
- Wilhelm Archipelago
