= David Stark =

David Stark is the name of:

- David C. Stark (born 1950), Professor of Sociology and International Affairs at Columbia University
- David D. Stark (1893-unknown), scientist associated with the Dean-Stark apparatus
- David Stark, member of Asta Kask
