= Stark Corporation =

Thai cable manufacturer holding company

- Formerly: Team A Holding 2 Co., Ltd.; Siam Inter Multimedia PLC
- Company type: Public company
- Traded as: SET: STARK
- Industry: Industrials
- Founded: April 1, 2015; 9 years ago as Team A Holding 2 in Bangkok
- Headquarters: Bangkok, Thailand
- Key people: Chanin Yensudchai (former CEO)
- Products: Electric cable
- Owner: Vonnarat Tangkaravakoon (50.16% in 2022)
- Number of employees: 3,000 (2023)
- Website: www.starkcorporation.com

Stark Corporation Public Company Limited is a Thai holding company in the electric cable manufacturing industry. It was formed in 2019 through a backdoor listing, and was listed on the SET100 index, but lost most of its value in 2023 after it was found to have falsified financial statements.

== History ==
Stark was set up as a holding company for Phelps Dodge International (Thailand) (PDIT), the former Thai unit of Phelps Dodge and Thailand's largest cable manufacturer.

PDIT had been founded as Phelps Dodge Thailand in 1968. In 2015, Vonnarat Tangkaravakoon, whose family is best known as the owners of TOA Paint, acquired a majority stake in PDIT as its previous owners exited the Thai market. Team A Holding 2 Co., Ltd. (TAH2) was set up as a private holding company for the business, and Chanin Yensudchai became its CEO.

In 2019, Vonnarat acquired a majority stake in comic book publisher Siam Inter Multimedia PCL, which was merged with TAH2 in a backdoor listing and renamed to Stark Corporation PCL on 10 July 2019.

In 2020, Stark acquired Vietnamese manufacturers Thipha Cable and Dovina. The new subsidiaries brought heavy losses, but these were covered up in Stark's financial reports. In an attempt to raise cash, it announced plans in 2022 to acquire a subsidiary of Germany's Leoni AG, but withdrew from the purchase. This shook investor confidence and the company's shares fell sharply, and in the ensuing fallout, the Securities and Exchange Commission stepped in to suspend trading, seized the company's assets, and brought fraud charges against its executives.
