= Stark, West Virginia =

- Unincorporated community
- Location within West Virginia Location within the United States
- Coordinates: 37°54′43″N 81°44′38″W
- Country: United States
- State: West Virginia
- County: Boone
- Elevation: 1,040 ft (320 m)
- Time zone: UTC-5 (Eastern (EST))
  - Summer (DST): UTC-4 (EDT)
- Area codes: 304 & 681
- GNIS feature ID: 1549938

Stark is an unincorporated community in Boone County, West Virginia, United States. Stark is 11 miles (18 km) south-southeast of Madison.
