= Starks =

Starks may refer to:

- Starks (surname)
- Starks, Illinois
- Starks, Louisiana
- Starks, Maine
- Starks, Wisconsin
- Starks Park, football field Scotland

== See also ==
- Stark (disambiguation)
