= Starker =

Starker is a surname shared by:

- Erwin Starker (1872–1938), German painter
- János Starker (1924–2013), Jewish Hungarian-American cellist
- Joseph B. Starker (1929–1975), US Army brigadier general, helicopter pilot

== See also ==
- A. Starker Leopold (1913–1983), American author, forester, zoologist and conservationist
- Starker exchange Mechanism to avoid certain capital gains taxes in the United States
