= Fish Lake Township, Chisago County, Minnesota =

Township in Minnesota, United States

Fish Lake Township
- Township
- Location within the state of Minnesota
- Coordinates: 45°36′5″N 93°5′13″W
- Country: United States
- State: Minnesota
- County: Chisago

Area
  - Total: 34.7 sq mi (89.9 km^{2})
  - Land: 32.2 sq mi (83.5 km^{2})
  - Water: 2.5 sq mi (6.4 km^{2})
- Elevation: 925 ft (282 m)

Population (2010)
  - Total: 2,012
  - Density: 62/sq mi (24.1/km^{2})
- Time zone: UTC-6 (Central (CST))
  - Summer (DST): UTC-5 (CDT)
- FIPS code: 27-21194
- GNIS feature ID: 0664172
- Website: www.fishlaketownshipmn.gov

Fish Lake Township is a township in Chisago County, Minnesota, United States. The population was 2,012 at the 2010 census.

== History ==
Fish Lake Township was organized in 1868. It took its name from Fish Lake.

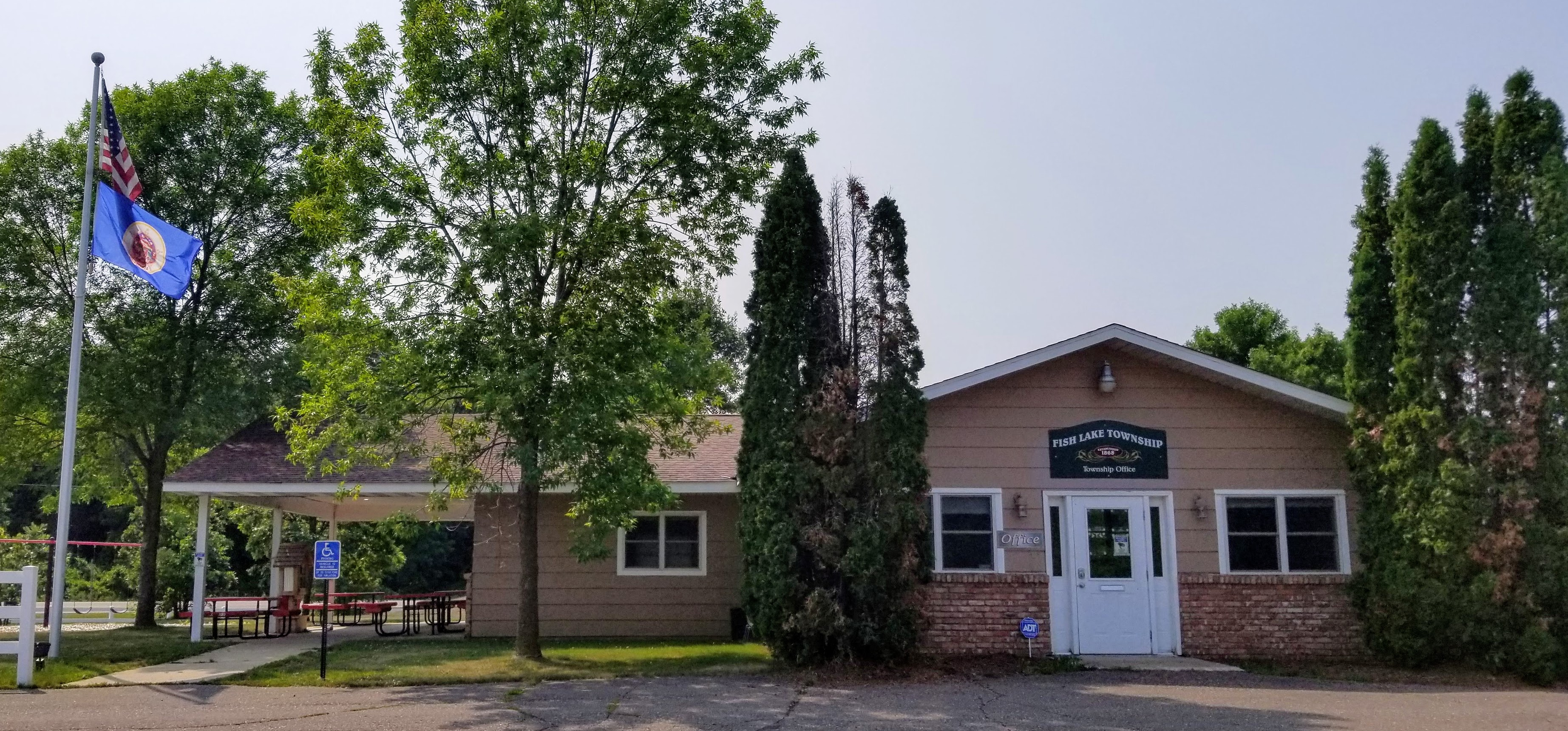
Fish Lake Township office.

== Geography ==
The township is located in northwest Chisago County and is bordered to the west and south by Isanti County. To the east is the city of Harris. The unincorporated community of Stark is in the southeast part of the township.

According to the United States Census Bureau, the township has a total area of 34.7 square miles (89.9 km^{2}), of which 32.2 square miles (83.5 km^{2}) is land and 2.5 square miles (6.4 km^{2}), or 7.14%, is water. There are several lakes in the township, the largest of which are Goose Lake in the north, and Horseshoe Lake and Fish Lake in the southeast.

== Demographics ==
Historical population
Census	Pop.	Note	%±
1870	385		—
1880	983		155.3%
1890	957		−2.6%
1900	1,104		15.4%
1910	1,032		−6.5%
1920	961		−6.9%
1930	835		−13.1%
1940	753		−9.8%
1950	629		−16.5%
1960	627		−0.3%
1970	819		30.6%
1980	1,074		31.1%
1990	1,183		10.1%
2000	1,723		45.6%
2010	2,012		16.8%
U.S. Decennial Census

As of the census of 2000, there were 1,723 people, 617 households, and 470 families residing in the township. The population density was 53.3 inhabitants per square mile (20.6/km^{2}). There were 746 housing units at an average density of 23.1 per square mile (8.9/km^{2}). The racial makeup of the township was 98.67% White, 0.17% African American, 0.41% Native American, 0.17% Asian, 0.06% from other races, and 0.52% from two or more races. Hispanic or Latino of any race were 0.64% of the population.

There were 617 households, out of which 33.9% had children under the age of 18 living with them, 68.2% were married couples living together, 3.7% had a female householder with no husband present, and 23.8% were non-families. 16.0% of all households were made up of individuals, and 5.0% had someone living alone who was 65 years of age or older. The average household size was 2.79 and the average family size was 3.16.

In the township the population was spread out, with 28.2% under the age of 18, 5.2% from 18 to 24, 30.9% from 25 to 44, 25.2% from 45 to 64, and 10.5% who were 65 years of age or older. The median age was 37 years. For every 100 females, there were 106.8 males. For every 100 females age 18 and over, there were 108.6 males.

The median income for a household in the township was $54,297, and the median income for a family was $60,648. Males had a median income of $39,148 versus $29,091 for females. The per capita income for the township was $22,051. About 3.6% of families and 4.1% of the population were below the poverty line, including 1.7% of those under age 18 and 5.7% of those age 65 or over.
