= Karl von Starck =

German lawyer and politician

Carl (Karl) August Wilhelm von Starck (27 September 1867 in Kassel – 22 August 1937) was a German lawyer and politician.

Karl was born in Kassel, the son of Wilhelm von Starck (1835–1913), a Hessian aristocrat and his wife Charlotte von Baumbach (1844–1914). In 1901 he was Landrat for Hörde. From 1919 to 1921 he was Reich and State Commissioner for the Occupied Rhenish Territories.
