= Krafft (surname) =

Krafft is a surname of Germanic origin. Notable people with the surname include:

- Adam Krafft (1493–1558), German stone sculptor
- Barbara Krafft (1764–1825), Austrian painter
- Charles Wing Krafft (fl. c. 2000), American artist
- David von Krafft (1655–1724), German-Swedish painter
- Friedrich Krafft (1852–1923), German chemist
- Heinrich Krafft, German World War II flying ace
- Hugues Krafft (1853–1935), French photographer
- Johann Peter Krafft (1780–1856), German painter
- Karl Ernst Krafft (1900–1945), Swiss astrologer
- Katia and Maurice Krafft (1942–1991 and 1946–1991), French volcanologists
- Laura Krafft, American comedian writer and actress
- Manfred Krafft (1937–2022), German football player and manager
- Per Krafft the Elder (1724–1793), Swedish painter
- Per Krafft the Younger (1777–1863), Swedish painter
- Vic Krafft (1919–1991), American basketball player
- Wilhelmina Krafft (1778–1828), Swedish painter
- Wolfgang Ludwig Krafft (1743–1814), German astronomer and physicist
- Konrad Krafft von Dellmensingen (1862–1953), German army general in WW1
- Richard von Krafft-Ebing (1840–1902), German psychiatrist

== See also ==
- Kraft (disambiguation)
