= Per Krafft =

Per Krafft may refer to:

- Per Krafft the Elder (1724–1793), Swedish portraitist
- Per Krafft the Younger (1777–1863), Swedish painter of portraits and history paintings
