= Craft (disambiguation) =

A craft is an occupation or trade requiring manual dexterity or artistic skill.

Craft or Crafts may also refer to:

== Arts and entertainment ==
- Craft (band), a Swedish black metal band formed in 1994
- Craft, a British rock band from the 1980s–1990s formed by a former member of The Enid
- Craft (film), a Brazilian film directed by Gustavo Pizzi
- Crafts, fictional societies in the role-playing game Mage: The Ascension

== Places ==
- Craft, Texas, an unincorporated community in Cherokee County, Texas, United States
- Craft Glacier, a glacier of Antarctica

== Periodicals ==
- Craft (American magazine), American magazine published by O'Reilly Media
- Craft (Japanese magazine), Japanese magazine published by Taiyoh Tosho

== Transport ==
- CRAFT (aviation), a mnemonic for the basic elements of a clearance in aviation
- Craft (vehicle)
  - Aircraft
  - Hovercraft
  - Landing craft
  - Spacecraft
  - Watercraft

== People with the name ==
- Craft (surname)
- Crafts (surname)

== Other uses ==
- Craft Academy for Excellence in Science and Mathematics
- Community Reinforcement Approach and Family Training (CRAFT)
- Craft brewery (craft beer)
- Craft service

== See also ==
- Decorative arts
- Krafft (disambiguation)
- Kraft (disambiguation)
- The Craft (disambiguation)
