= Krafft =

Krafft may refer to:

- Krafft (crater), a crater on the Moon
- Krafft temperature, the minimum temperature at which surfactants form micelles
- Krafft Arnold Ehricke (1917–1984), rocket-propulsion engineer and advocate for space colonization
- Krafft (surname), a surname

== See also ==
- Kraft (disambiguation)
- Craft (disambiguation)
