= Queen Elizabeth Scholarship Trust =

- Formation: 1990; 36 years ago
- Type: Charity
- Headquarters: 1 Buckingham Palace; London, England SW1E 6HR
- Region served: United Kingdom
- Website: www.queenelizabethtrust.org

The Queen Elizabeth Scholarship Trust (abbreviated as QEST) is an art and craft educational trust created to sustain traditional British craftsmanship. It is a British institution committed to helping support craftspeople of all ages and from all backgrounds, at a critical stage in their careers.

The 130 crafts that QEST funds the study of include horology, fine metal work, book binding, woodwork, stone masonry, leather working, silversmithing, cordwaining, textile design & making, sculpting, basket weaving, and tapestry.

== History ==
The trust was established in 1990 to celebrate the 150th anniversary of the Royal Warrant Holders Association and the 90th birthday of Queen Elizabeth the Queen Mother. It is the charitable arm of this association. In 2016, QEST welcomed Queen Elizabeth II as patron in her 90th birthday year. Since 2017, King Charles III (then Prince of Wales) has been the society's patron.

== Grants ==
QEST offers two forms of grant giving: scholarships and apprenticeships.

QEST scholarships are for individuals more established in the field, looking to complete additional training and excel in their craft. Grants given by the trust aim to help those who already have a significant degree of skill in their chosen craft to develop those skills to a very high level. Grants range from £2,000 to £15,000, and are often given to cover tuition fees and living costs during an individual's training.

QEST apprenticeships are for individuals wishing to begin their career in a practical art, to enter into on-the-job-learning with a master craftsperson. These collaborative grants are awarded to both parties, to fund the tuition and employment of an apprentice during the duration of their three-year apprenticeship. Grants range from £6,000 to £18,000 and are often given to fund material costs and supplement the individual's wage.

Since 2013, QEST have been offering an Award for Excellence annually to a QEST Scholar who has made an outstanding contribution to their craft and the sector, whilst demonstrating their commitment to training and passing on skills to the next generation. The winner is presented with an engraved medal designed and made by Thomas Fattorini Ltd and £1,000 prize.

== See also ==
- Queen's Jubilee Scholarship Trust (QUEST), set up in 1977 with the Institution of Civil Engineers, funds undergraduate courses
