= Craft (surname) =

Craft is a surname. Notable people with the surname include:

- Aaron Craft (born 1991), American basketball player
- Charles Craft (1902–1968), English-born American film and television editor
- Chris Craft (racing driver) (1939–2021), British motor racing driver
- Christine Craft (born 1944), American radio talk show host and former television anchorperson
- Donnie Craft (born 1959), American football player
- Edward B. Craft (1881–1929), American electrical and communications engineer
- Ellen Craft (c. 1826–c. 1891), slave from Macon, Georgia, whose escape was widely publicized
- James Craft (disambiguation), several people
- Jason Craft (born 1976), American professional football cornerback
- Joe Craft (born 1950), American businessman and philanthropist
- Juanita Craft (1902–1985), American civil rights pioneer
- Kelly Craft (born 1962), United States Ambassador to the United Nations and United States Ambassador to Canada
- Kinuko Y. Craft (born 1940), American artist
- Marcella Craft (1874–1959), American soprano
- Melanie Craft (born 1969), American romance novelist
- Nikki Craft (born 1949), American political activist
- Paul Craft (1938–2014), American singer-songwriter
- Robert Craft (1923–2015), American conductor and writer on music
- Russ Craft (1919–2009), American professional football defensive back
- Shanice Craft (born 1993), German athlete
- Shelley Craft (born 1976), Australian television personality
- Shirley Craft (1927–2010), American politician and educator
- Tom Craft (born 1953), American football coach
- Tylee Craft (2001–2024), American football player

== Fictional characters ==
- Ellie Craft, a.k.a. Onpu Segawa, from the anime series Ojamajo Doremi

== See also ==
- Crafts (surname)
