= Every Good Boy Deserves Favour =

Every Good Boy Deserves Favour may refer to:

- Every Good Boy Deserves Favour, a mnemonic for the five lines of the treble clef
- Every Good Boy Deserves Favour (play), a 1977 stage play by Tom Stoppard with music by André Previn
- Every Good Boy Deserves Favour (album), a 1971 album by the Moody Blues

== See also ==
- Every Good Boy Deserves Fudge, a 1991 album by Mudhoney
