= Every Good Boy Does Fine =

Every Good Boy Does Fine may refer to:

- Every Good Boy Does Fine, a mnemonic for the five lines of the treble clef
- "Every Good Boy Does Fine", an episode of the 1989 television series Men
- "Every Good Boy Does Fine", a 1994 episode of the television series Me and the Boys
- Every Good Boy Does Fine, a 2012 short film by Daniel Kokotajlo (director)
- Every Good Boy Does Fine: A Love Story in Music Lessons, a 2022 memoir by Jeremy Denk
