= Wilder, Tennessee =

- Unincorporated community
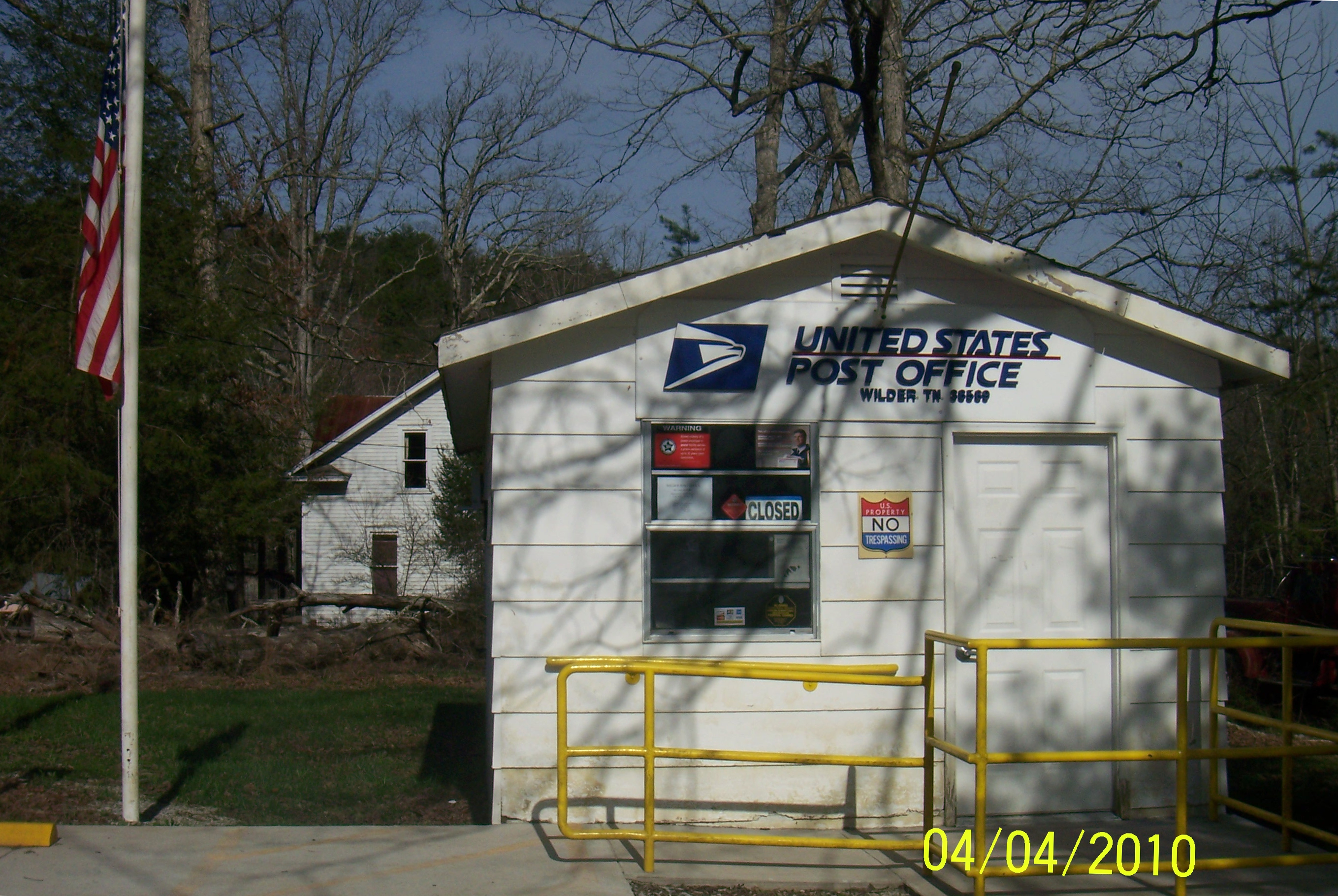
- Wilder Post Office in 2010

- Location within Tennessee Location within the United States
- Coordinates: 36°15′58″N 85°05′26″W
- Country: United States
- State: Tennessee
- County: Fentress
- Founded: 1902
- Founder: John T. Wilder
- Named for: John T. Wilder
- Elevation: 1,506 ft (459 m)
- Time zone: UTC-6 (Central (CST))
  - Summer (DST): UTC-5 (CDT)
- ZIP Code: 38589
- Area code: 931
- GNIS feature ID: 1274557

Wilder is an unincorporated community in Fentress County, Tennessee, United States. The community is in the Cumberland Mountains near Cookeville, Tennessee.

== History ==
=== Early development ===
Wilder was a planned company town, intended to provide housing for employees of the Fentress Coal and Coke Company. Town planning began in 1901, and the first coal mine opened in 1902. The town was named for the company owner, John T. Wilder. It was well established by 1903, including the first school in the area. The town church, the non-denominational Boyer's Chapel, was built in 1922. In 1923, the school began adding high school classes, and the first high school graduates were the class of 1932.

=== Killing of union leader Barney Graham ===
Wilder was the site of a coal-miners strike in July 1932, after wages had been cut by twenty percent. After the year of violent unrest that followed, the strike ended shortly after Barney Graham, leader of the local United Mine Workers union, was shot and killed in front of the company store on April 30, 1933. His funeral was attended by almost a thousand people. Company mine guard Jack "Shorty" Green was acquitted of a murder charge. The mine never recovered from the destructive events of the strike, and the seam still contains tens of millions of tons of recoverable coal.

Hedy West's 1965 album Old Times and Hard Times included the song "The Davidson-Wilder Blues" about the coal-miners strike, and the song "Lament For Barney Graham" specifically about the killing of Graham.

J.H. Gason penned his novel High Winds: Quest for Rome: Story of the Cumberland River Coal War Lynchings (2021) based on the many murders which took place at Wilder and surrounding areas during this era.

== Demographics ==
As a coal-mining town, the community reached a population of 2,350 in 1924, with over 10,000 people living in the general area, but had declined to about 400 by 1957, and an estimated population of 249 in 2013.

== Notable people ==
- Bettye Fahrenkamp (1923–1991), Alaska state senator and educator, was born in Wilder.

== Gallery ==
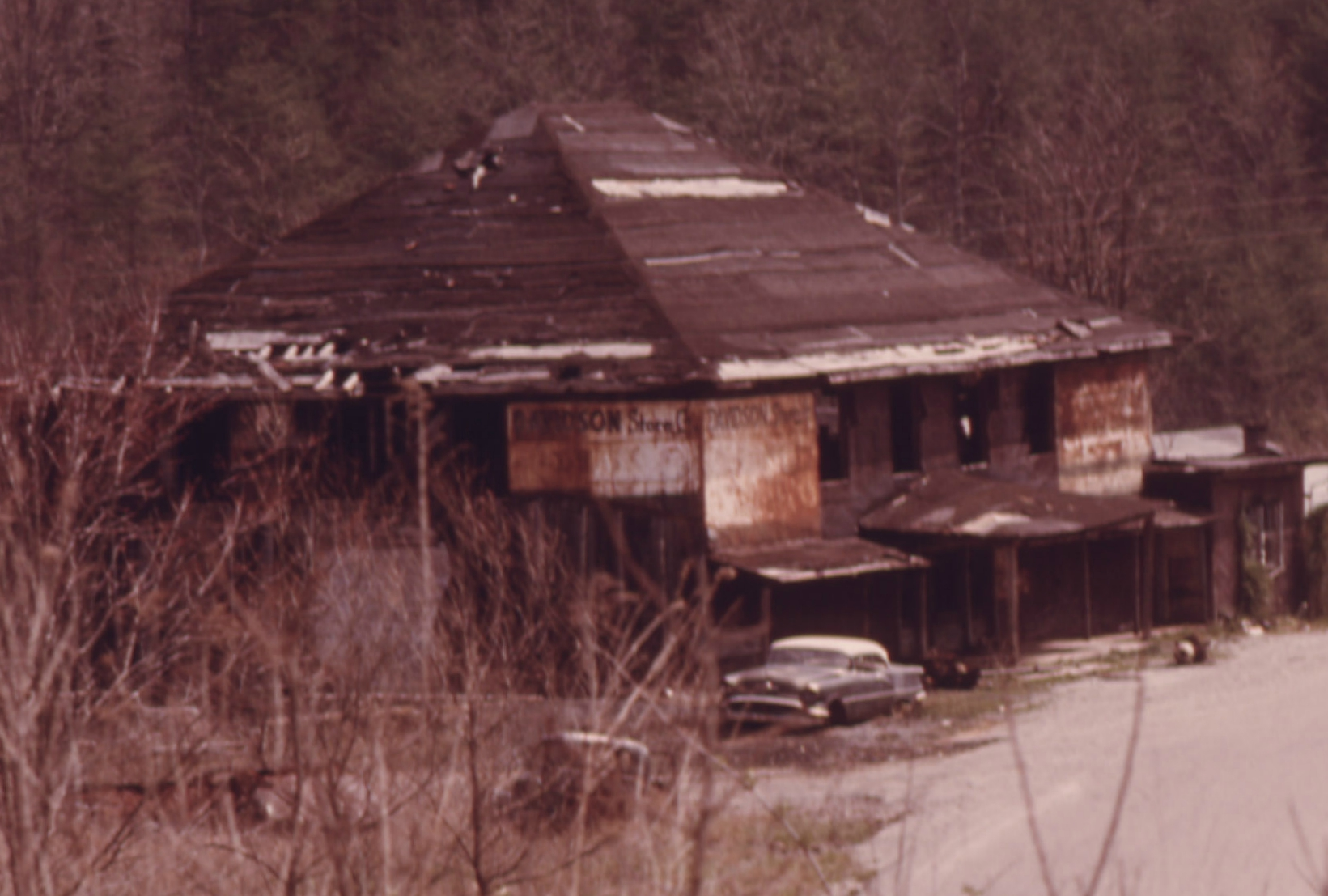
Coal company store in 1974, after it had been gutted by fire

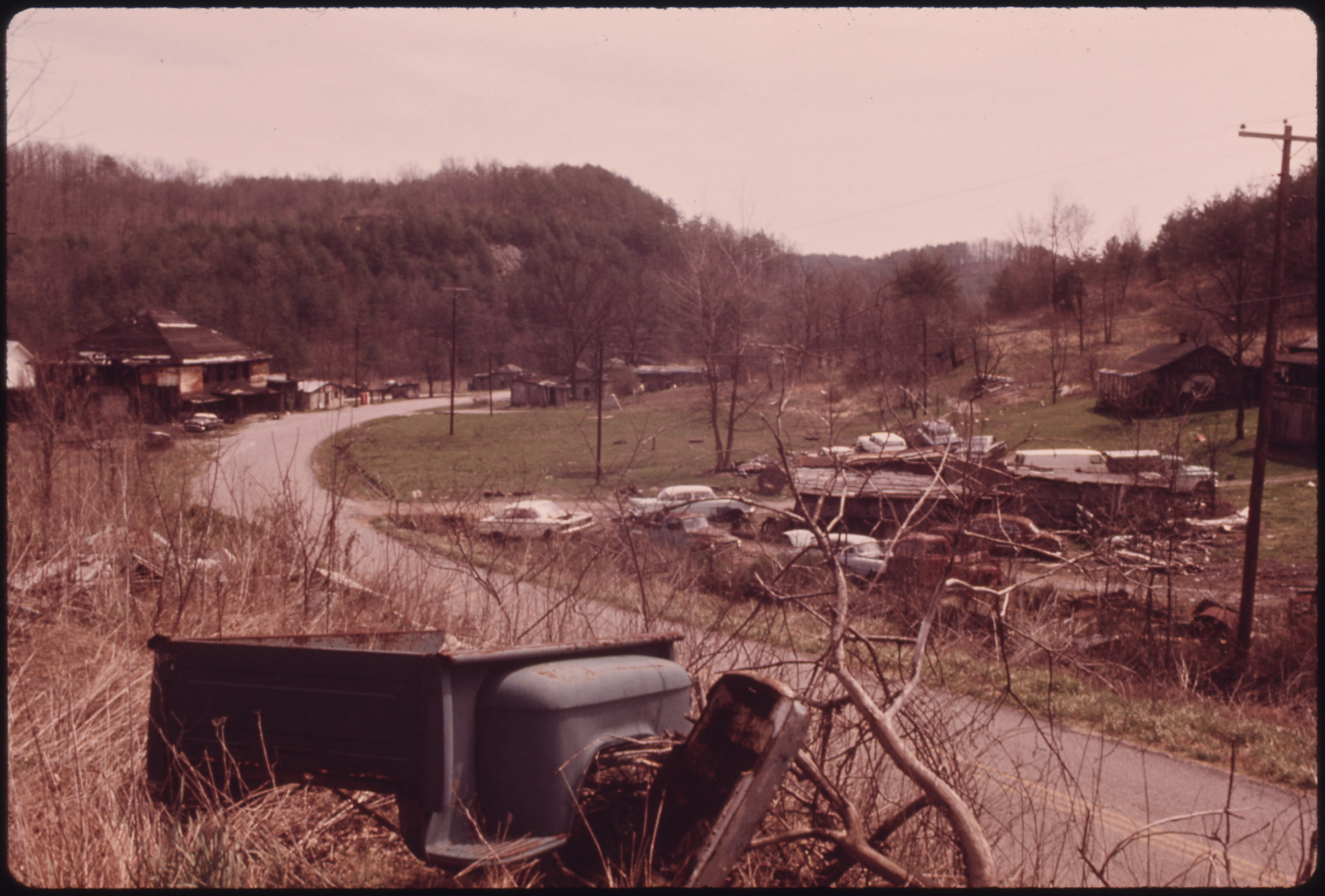
Abandoned cars in Wilder, 1974

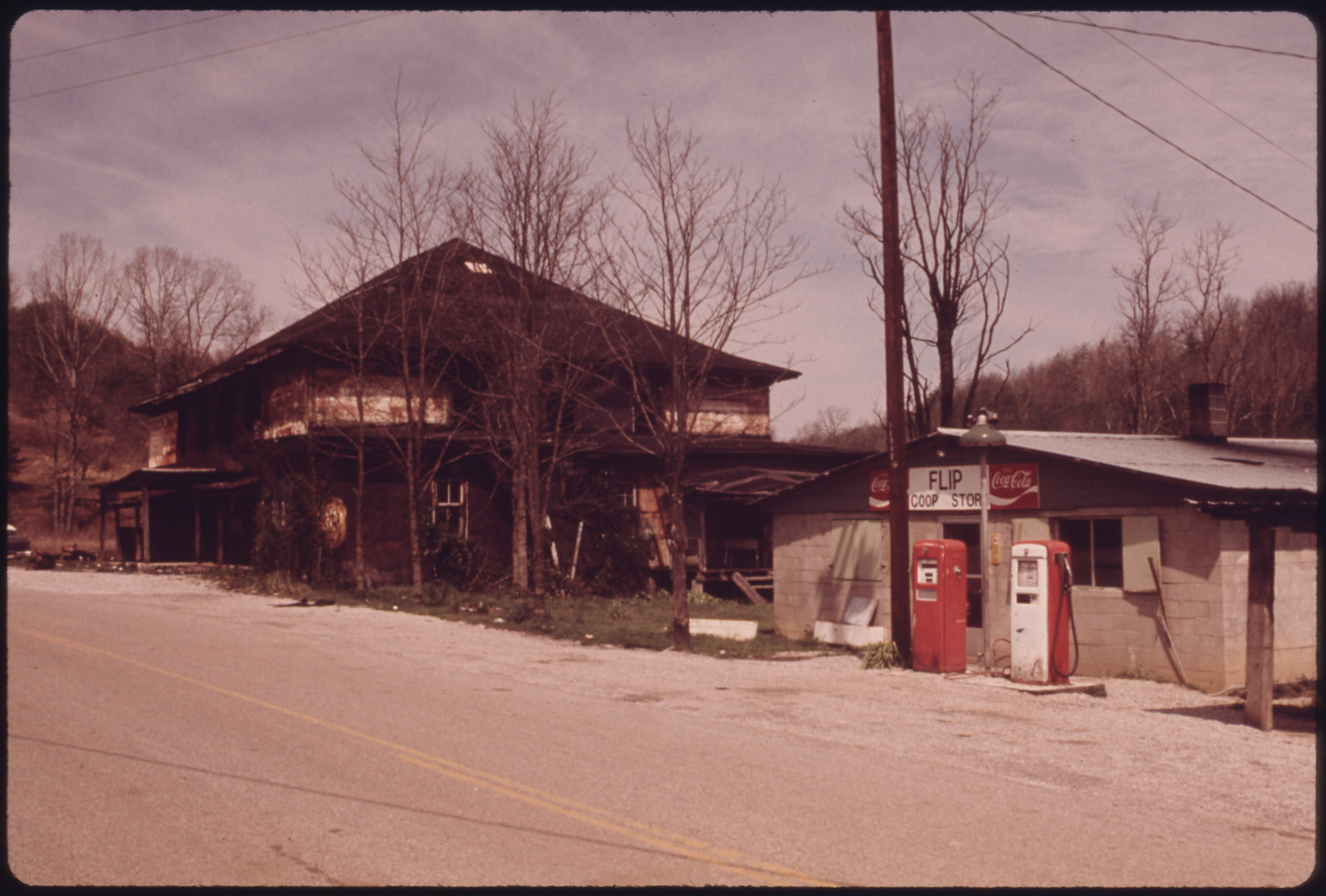
Flip Co-Op Store in Wilder next to the old company store, 1974

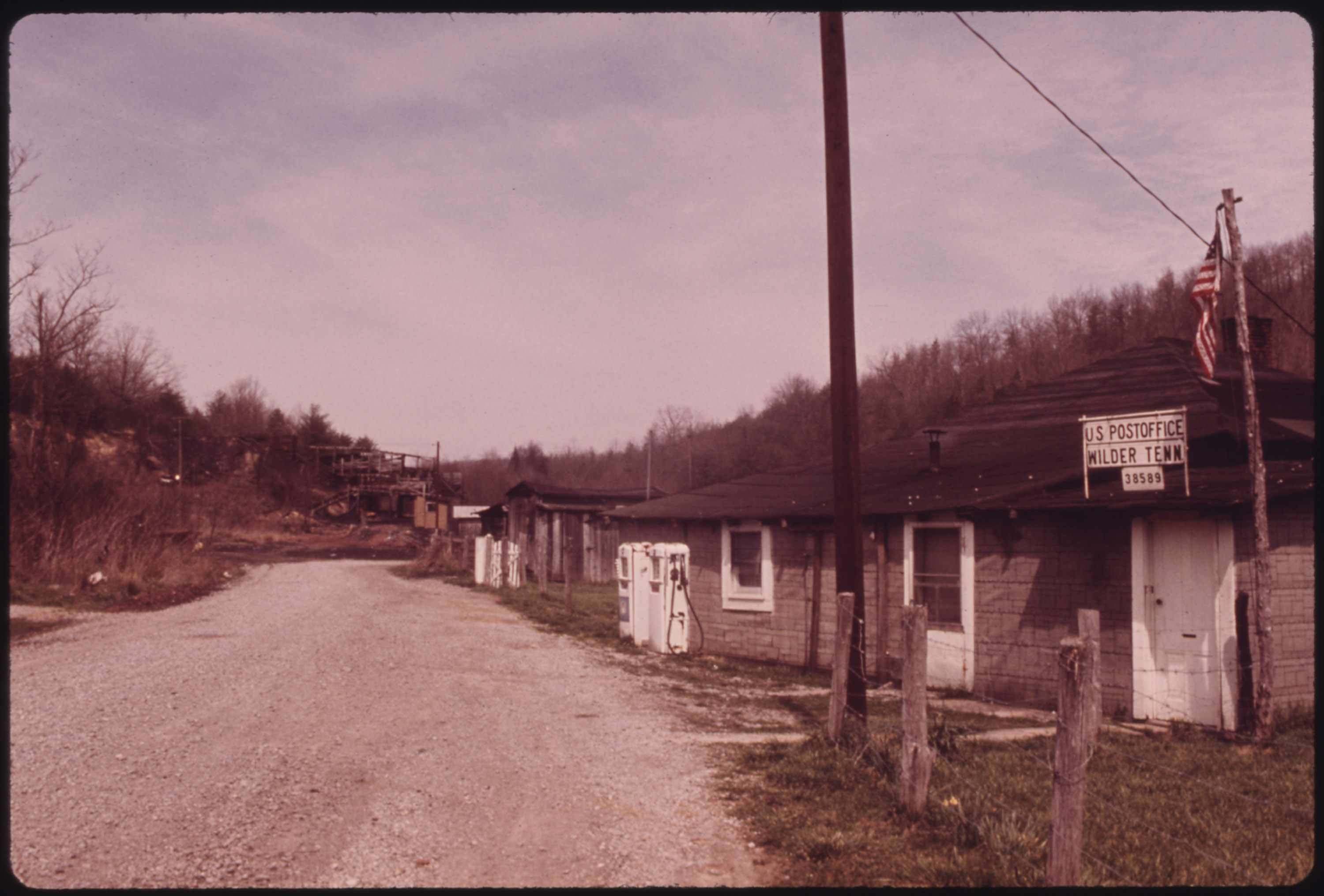
Wilder Post Office in 1974
