= Bettye Fahrenkamp =

American politician

Bettye Hargis Fahrenkamp
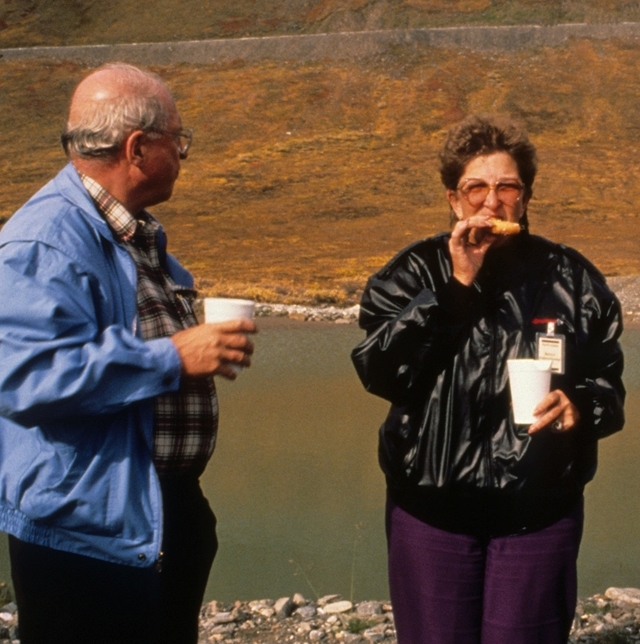

Member of the Alaska Senate from the Fairbanks and the Interior district
- In office 1978 – August 12, 1991 (her death)
- Succeeded by: Shirley Craft

Chair of the Senate Resources Committee
- In office 1989–1990

Chair of the Alaska Legislative Council
- In office November 14, 1990 – August 12, 1991

Personal details
- Born: September 6, 1923 Wilder, Tennessee, U.S.
- Died: August 12, 1991 (aged 67) Fairbanks, Alaska, U.S.
- Party: Democratic

Military service
- Allegiance: United States
- Branch/service: Women's Army Corps

Bettye M. Fahrenkamp (September 6, 1923 – August 12, 1991) was an American educator and politician.

Born in Wilder, Fentress County, Tennessee, Fahrenkamp served in the Women's Army Corps during World War II. She received her bachelor's degree in education from the University of Tennessee. In 1956, Fahrenkamp moved to Fairbanks, Alaska Territory with her husband, "Gib" Fahrenkamp, a contractor (and later fellow politician), where she taught music in the Fairbanks school district. Fahrenkamp retired from teaching in 1974. She was involved with the Democratic Party and served on the staff of United States Senator Mike Gravel of Alaska. Fahrenkamp served in the Alaska Senate from 1979 until her death in 1991. Fahrenkamp died from bone cancer at her home in Fairbanks, Alaska.

The Alaska Legislature passed a bill in 1992 to name room 203 in the Alaska State Capitol as the "Fahrenkamp Room" in her honor.
