= List of visual mnemonics =

Visual mnemonics are a type of mnemonic that work by associating an image with characters or objects whose name sounds like the item that has to be memorized.

== Examples ==
=== Digits ===
Digits can be memorized by their shapes, so that: 0 -looks like an egg, or a ball; 1 -a pencil, or a candle; 2 -a duck, or a swan; 3 -an ear; a pair of pouted lips. 4 -a sail, a yacht; 5 -a key; 6 -a comet; 7 -a knee; 8 -a snowman, or a pair of glasses; 9 -an apostrophe, or comma.

=== Biochemistry ===
- Biochemical cycles (i.e., the urea cycle or the citric acid cycle) and their metabolites can be represented by means of hands and fingers (visual imagery mnemonics) which are associated to tales (narrative mnemonics). A hand, depending on its characteristics (e.g. having or not having a fingernail or a nail lunula), represents a biochemical structure and its associated chemical term.
- A visual mnemonic for the drug hydralazine could be represented as "lazy hydra" that is lying on a beach holding a sign "NO more work". "NO" in the above case symbolizes Nitric oxide, which is related to the drug's mechanism of action.
- The symbols for the thirteen macronutrient elements in biology spell CHOPKINS CaFe Mg NaCl, or C. Hopkins Cafe [food tastes] m[ighty] g[ood] with salt (NaCl). Note however, that this popular and useful mnemonic is typical in that it is neither comprehensive nor context-free. Classification of some elements, such as Na, Cl and Fe, as macro- or micronutrients is arbitrary; it depends on the organisms in question, and there are several biologically important micronutrients not mentioned.

=== Zoology ===
African and Indian elephants' ears resemble their respective maps

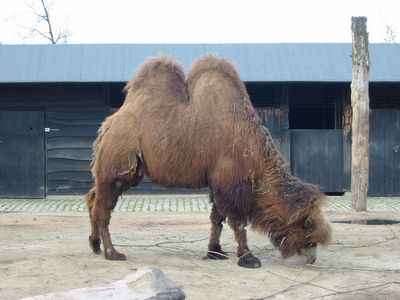
Bactrian camels resemble the letter B

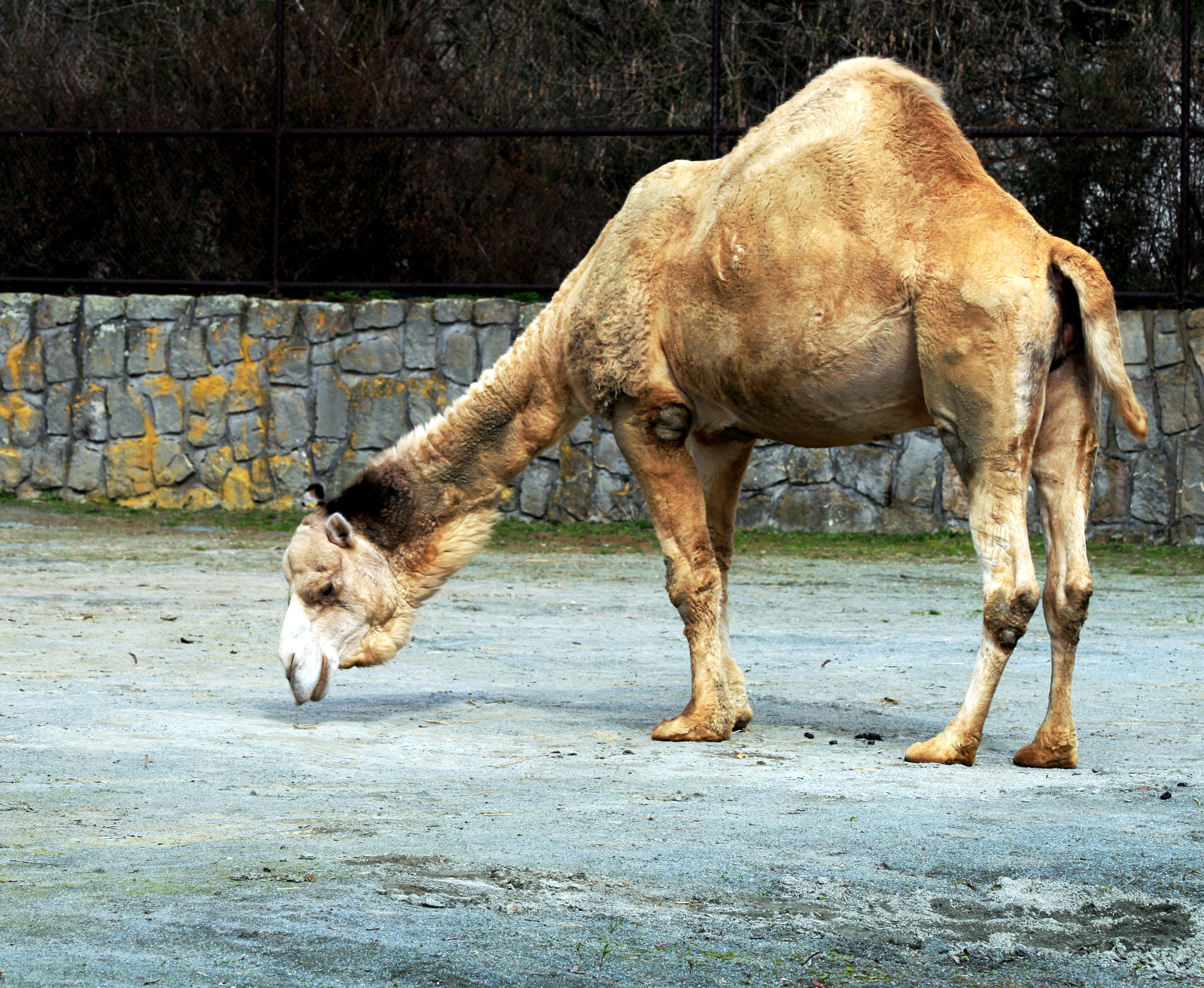
Dromedary camels resemble the letter D

- An African elephant's ears are large and shaped like Africa, while an Asian elephant's ears are small and shaped like India.
- A Bactrian Camel's back is shaped like the letter B. A Dromedary's back is shaped like the letter D.
- The species of salmon can be remembered through the fingers on the hand: chum is the thumb, sockeye is your index finger (like poking someone in the eye), king is your middle finger (the largest of the fingers), silver is your ring finger, pink is the pinky finger.

=== Calendar ===
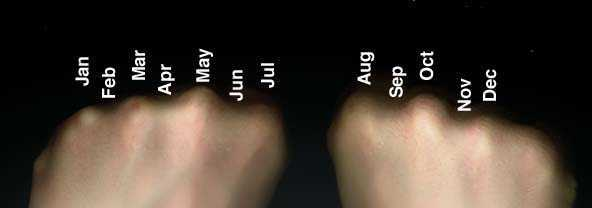
Knuckle mnemonic

- A mnemonic for the number of days in each month uses the knuckles (and the dips between them) of two fists, held together, moving right from the left pinky knuckle. The raised knuckles can be seen as the 31-day months, the dips between them as the 30-day-months (and February). The gap between the hands ignored. (Thus: left-hand-pinky-knuckle = January, dip = February, left-hand-ring-knuckle = March, dip = April, and so on to left-hand-index-knuckle = July; then continue with right-hand-index-knuckle = August, dip = September, etc.).
- The order of leap years in the Hebrew calendar can be compared to white keys on a keyboard. In the key of C, white keys represent leap years if every half-step between white key indicating 1 whole year between leap years and a whole-step between white keys indicates two complete years between leap years. For a total of 7 leap years for every 19 years beginning with C as year 0/year 19 in the cycle.

=== Phases of the Moon ===
- "DOC" represents phases of the Moon by shape as viewed from the northern hemisphere: "D" is the waxing moon; "O" the full moon; and "C" represent the waning moon.
- A simple English saying is "Dog comes in (the room), Cat goes out".
- Holding one's hand up vertically against the crescent moon, the "baby" or waxing moon will form a lower-case "b", and the "dying" moon will form a lower-case "d".
- In the Southern Hemisphere, the moon phases appear in reverse, with the sequence being "COD" - "C" is the waxing moon; "O" the full moon; and "D" the waning moon.
- From an astronomical point of view, remember the alternative name "Charles' Wain" for the Big Dipper- "wain" being pronounced just like "wane".

==== Other languages ====
- A Lithuanian mnemonic is that the waxing moon at its first (lith:priešpilnis) quarter phase looks like a 'p', and the waning moon at its last (lith:delčia) quarter looks like a 'd'.
- A French mnemonic is that the waxing moon at its first (fr:premier) quarter phase looks like a 'p', and the waning moon at its last (fr:dernier) quarter looks like a 'd'. A more childlike mnemonic explains that the moon is a liar: the waxing moon looks like an upper-case D, which would correspond to the French verb décroître (meaning: to shrink) but since she (the moon) is une menteuse (a liar) she is in fact doing the opposite: growing. The waning moon looks like a(n upper-case) C, corresponding to the word croître (meaning: to grow), but will be a lie and therefore mean that the moon is 'shrinking'.
- In Germany, the curve of the moon was traditionally compared to the beginning stroke of the handwritten small letters a (Abnehmen = waning) and z (Zunehmen = waxing), but since this really makes sense only when thinking of the obsolete German handwriting it is rapidly falling into disuse.
- A more modern German version compares the moon to a pair of round brackets (German: Klammern):

( = Klammer auf –> Abnehmen = waning
) = Klammer zu –> Zunehmen = waxing

- Another Northern Hemisphere mnemonic, which works for most Romance languages, says that the moon is a liar: it spells "C", as in crescere (Latin for "to grow") when it wanes, and "D" as in decrescere ("decrease") when it waxes. Alternatively, it is said that ancient Romans explained that Gods looked at the vault of heaven from above (behind), so they read the letters mirrored.
- In the Southern Hemisphere, in Spanish-speaking countries, the C represents "Creciente" (waxing) and D "Decreciente" (waning).
- In the Polish language and Czech language, the D and C can be interpreted as verbs describing the Moon's action: Księżyc się ... (The moon is ...) Dopełnia (waxing) and Cofa (waning); in Czech Měsíc ... (The moon is ...) Dorůstá (waxing) and Couvá (waning). Also, in Polish one might remember that Księżyc będzie ... (The moon will be ...) Duży (big) or Cienki (thin).
- A Russian mnemonic is that the waxing moon is right part of letter 'Р', which is the first letter of word растущая (growing), and the waning moon looks like 'C' which is first letter of the word стареющая (getting old).
- A Norwegian mnemonic is "When it looks like a comma, it's coming!" (nor: Når han ser ut som et komma, så kom'an / kom'ern!).
- In Hebrew the shape of the letter is also correlated to what the rising and waning moon. It is rising when it looks like the cursive ז which is also the first word in זוֹרֵחַ [zoreach] (to rise) and the moon is waning when it looks like the cursive ג which is also the first work of גּוֹרֵעַ [gorea] (to take away).
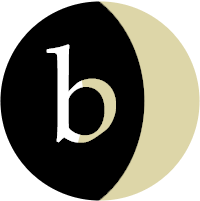
::Beginning

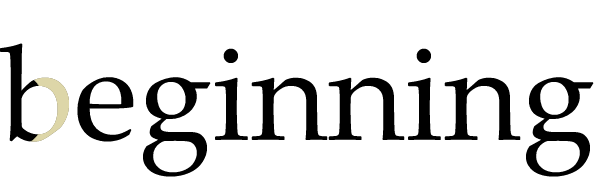

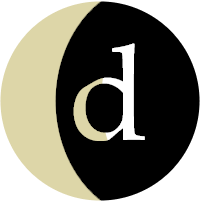
::Descending

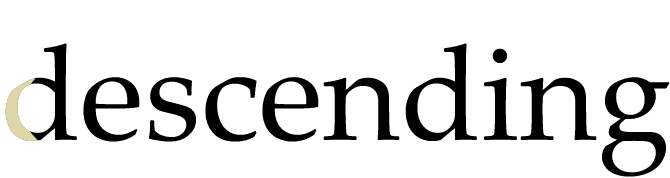

=== Right/left hand mnemonics ===
- When both hands are held up palm out, thumbs stuck out perpendicular to fingers, the Left hand is the one that makes the shape of the letter L.
- In electromagnetism, right and left hand rules are used to find the direction of force and current respectively. Here the hands are used as an aid for remembering the directions of force and current.
- The right hand thumb rule is another hand mnemonic. Here the curled hand is used and the fingers points in the direction of magnetic field when thumb points the direction of current through the conductor.
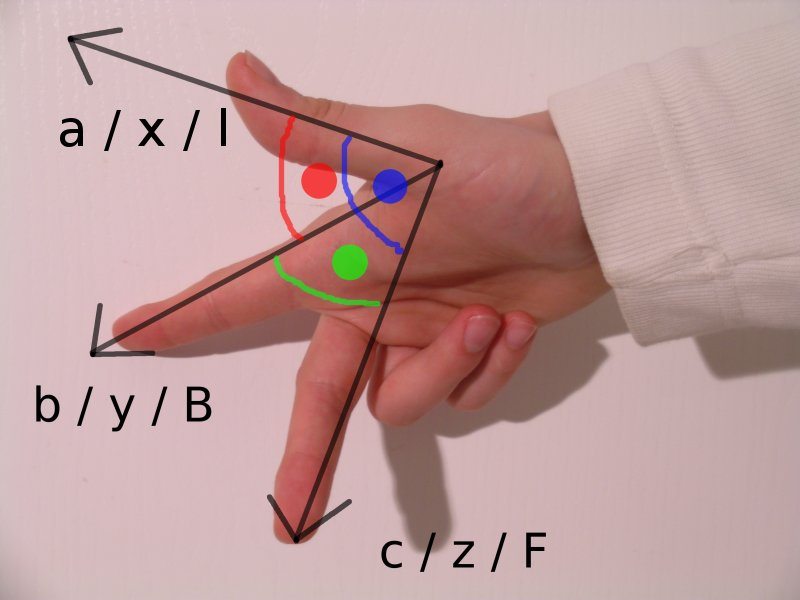
Fleming's right hand rule

Fleming's left hand rule for motors

Right hand thumb rule

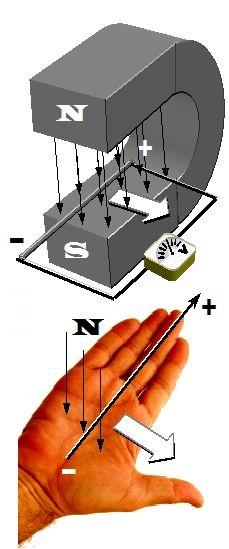
Determining the direction of induced currents

== See also ==
- Mnemonic
- List of mnemonics
