= The Craft =

The Craft may refer to:

== Common uses ==
- a casual alternative name for Freemasonry
- an alternative name for neopagan witchcraft
  - an alternative name for Wicca

== Entertainment ==
- The Craft (album), a 2005 album by Blackalicious
- The Craft (film), a 1996 American film
  - The Craft: Legacy, a 2020 American film

== See also ==
- Craft (disambiguation)
