= Wilhelmina Krafft =

Swedish artist (1778–1828)

Maria Wilhelmina Krafft
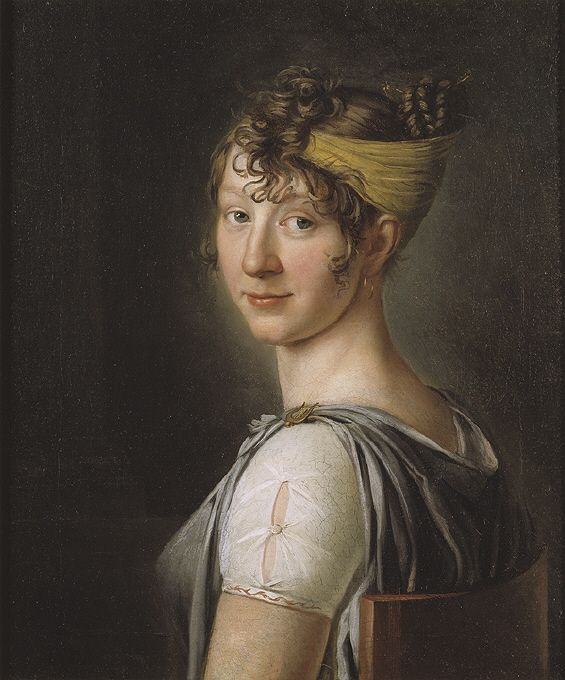
- portrait by Per Krafft the Younger
- Born: 1783; Stockholm, Sweden
- Died: 1839 (aged 55–56)
- Education: Royal Swedish Academy of Arts

Maria Wilhelmina Krafft (married name Noreaus, 1778–1828) was a Swedish painter and portrait miniaturist. She was the daughter of the painter Per Krafft the Elder and Maria Vilhelmina Ekebom and the sister of the painter Per Krafft the Younger.

== Life ==
Wilhelmina Krafft was born in Stockholm. She and her brother acted as models for their father's child portraits, a genre for which he was famous. One of these paintings portrays Per drawing and Wilhelmina at his feet in admiration (1783), and another depicts Wilhelmina alone praying (1782).

Wilhelmina and her brother studied art at the Royal Swedish Academy of Arts, where her main teacher was Lorentz Svensson Sparrgren. In 1797, she debuted with her brother in the annual art exhibition of the Royal Academy of Arts in Stockholm. Her work and talent impressed and she was decorated with the academy's second medal for her work at her first exhibition for her "beautiful prof. works in mignature". In the following exhibition of 1798, she participated with her original miniature portraits. She died in Norrköping.

Her style of painting has been described as cold and icy and as such typically representative of the contemporary neoclassical empire art. She married the medical doctor Olof Noréus (1770–1846) and was the mother of the painter Pamela Clementina Noraéus (1817–1892).
