= Crafts (surname) =

Crafts is a surname. Notable people with the surname include:

- Alden Springer Crafts (1897–1990), American botanist
- Clayton E. Crafts (1848–1920), American politician
- Dale J. Crafts (born 1958), American politician
- Helle Crafts (1947–1986), American murder victim
- James Crafts (1839–1917), American chemist
- Jerry Crafts (born 1968), American footballer
- Lisa Crafts (21st century), American artist
- Nicholas Crafts (1949–2023), British historian
- Samuel C. Crafts (1768–1853), American politician
- Sara Jane Crafts (1845–1930), American social reformer, author, educator

== See also ==
- Craft (surname)
