= List of mnemonics =

This article contains a list of notable mnemonics used to remember various objects, lists, etc.

== Astronomy ==
- Order of planets from the Sun: (Mercury, Venus, Earth, Mars, Jupiter, Saturn, Uranus, Neptune, Pluto)

obsolete (per the IAU definition of planet):

Most Vegetables Eat More Juice So Usually Never Pee
My Very Educated Mother Just Served Us Nine Potatoes
Many Vicious Elephants Met Just Slightly Under New Pineapples
My Very Easy Method Just Speeds Up Naming Planets
Mark's Very Extravagant Mother Just Sent Us Ninety Parakeets
Mother Very Eagerly Made A (Asteroids) Jelly Sandwich Under No Protest
Many Volcanoes Erupt Molten Jam Sandwiches Usually Not Palatable

Since the IAU change the definition of a planet and relegated Pluto to the status of minor planet, the following has gained popularity

My Very Excellent Mother Just Served Us Nachos
Mary's Violet Eyes Make John Stay Up Nights

- Stellar classification sequence: O B A F G K M R N S

Oh Be A Fine Girl/Guy, Kiss Me Right Now, Sweetheart!

- Revised stellar classification sequence: O B A F G K M L T Y

Old, Bald, And Fat Generals Kiss More Ladies Than You

- Signs of the zodiac:

(Aries,	Taurus,	Gemini,	Cancer,	Leo,	Virgo,	Libra,	Scorpio,	Sagittarius,	Capricorn,	Aquarius,	Pisces)
A	Tense	Grey	Cat	Lays	Very	Low,	Sneaking	Slowly,	Contemplating	A	Pounce.

== Biology ==
- To remember the order of taxa in biology (Domain, Kingdom, Phylum, Class, Order, Family, Genus, Species, [Variety]):
  - "Dear King Philip Came Over For Good Soup" is often cited as a non-vulgar method for teaching students to memorize the taxonomic classification of system. Other variations tend to start with the mythical king, with one author noting "The nonsense about King Philip, or some ribald version of it, has been memorized by generations of biology students".
  - Dear King Philip Claps Often For Good Science
  - Dark King Prawns Curl Over Fresh Green Salad
  - Do Kings Play Chess On Fine Green Silk?
  - Dumb Kids Prefer Cheese Over Fried Greasy Spinach
  - Do Kindly Place Cover On Fresh Green Spring Vegetables
  - Darn Kernel Panics Crash Our Family Game System
  - Do Keep Pond Clean Or Frog Gets Sick
  - Dumb Kids Play Catch Over Father's Grave Stone
  - Daniel Keeps Philip Cat On Friday Getting Salsa
  - Dumb Kids Pushing Cups Over Feeds Growing Spite
- To remember the processes that define living things:
  - MRS GREN: Movement; Respiration; Sensation; Growth; Reproduction; Excretion; Nutrition
- To remember the number of humps on types of camels:
  - D in Dromedary has one hump; B in Bactrian has two
- To recognize poison ivy
  - Leaves of three, leave it be.
  - Hairy vine, no friend of mine.
- COWS stand for Cold Opposite Warm Same, which are the relation between the components of the Caloric reflex test
- To memorise DNA/nucleotide base pairs
  - Tigers Are Great Cats, first letters of the word pairs (T-A, G-C) stand for base pairs.
- To memorise the types of antibodies
  - GAMED: IgG, IgA, IgM, IgE, IgD
- To memorise the first six fields of sequence match records in a SAM file (Query, Flags, Reference name, Position, Mapping quality, CIGAR):
  - Queen Felicity Rarely Plays Multi-dimensional Chess

== Chemistry ==
- To recall the names of the first 20 elements in the periodic table:

Harry, he likes beer by cupfuls, not over frothy, never nasty mugs allowed. Since past six closing, are kegs cancelled?

(H, He, Li, Be, B, C, N, O, F, Ne, Na, Mg, Al, Si, P, S, Cl, Ar, K, Ca.)

- To remember the electrodes on which oxidation and reduction occurs (An Ox, Red Cat)

An Ox (Oxidation at Anode)

Red Cat (Reduction at Cathode)

- To remember the different charges of the anode and cathode in electrolysis (PANIC):

Positive Anode Negative Is Cathode

- AN OIL RIG CAT:

At the ANode, Oxidation Involves electron Loss.
Reduction Involves electron Gain at the CAThode.

- CHON: to remember the four most common elements in organisms

Carbon, Hydrogen, Oxygen, Nitrogen

- CHNOPS: to remember the six most common elements in organisms

Carbon, Hydrogen, Nitrogen, Oxygen, Phosphorus, Sulfur

== Engineering ==
- For the EIA electronic color code, Black(0), Brown(1), Red(2), Orange(3), Yellow(4), Green(5), Blue(6), Violet(7), Gray(8), White(9), Gold(5%), Silver(10%), None(20%)

Big brown rabbits often yield great big vocal groans when gingerly slapped
Bad boys run our young girls behind victory garden walls
B. B. Roy [of] Great Britain [has] Very Good Wife.

- A mnemonic to remember which way to turn common (right-hand thread) screws and nuts, including light bulbs, is "Righty-tighty, Lefty-loosey"; another is "Right on, Left off".
- For the OSI Network Layer model Please Do Not Throw Sausage Pizza Away correspond to the Physical, Datalink, Network, Transport, Session, Presentation and Application layers.
- For power in watts: Twinkle twinkle little star, Power equals I (current) squared R (resistance).
- "ELI the ICE man": E leads the I in an inductor, I leads the E in a capacitor. Useful in power factor correction.

== Geography ==
- Both names of the northern major circles of latitude (the Arctic Circle and Tropic of Cancer) have six letters; both southern ones (the Antarctic Circle and Tropic of Capricorn) have nine.
- The countries of South America in order of largest to smallest by area: Brazil, Argentina, Peru, Colombia, Bolivia, Venezuela, Chile, Paraguay, Ecuador, Guyana, Uruguay, Suriname

- Boring, Average Politics Can Become Very Corrupt. People Everywhere Get Used Sometimes

- The countries of Central America from North to South: Belize, Guatemala, El Salvador, Honduras, Nicaragua, Costa Rica, Panama

- Big Gorillas Eat Hotdogs, Not Cold Pizza
- Including Mexico, My Grandma's Bunny Eats Hamburgers, Not Canned Peas

- The Lesser Antilles in the Caribbean Sea including the eight independent nations and eight larger island territories (and excluding the "ABC" islands of Aruba, Bonaire, and Curaçao), in order generally from northwest to southeast:

- BUt Angry SaM's StuBborn KNights ABandon Money to Guard Dominant Marines and SteaL SteVe's Barrels of Green Tobacco
- (British Virgin Islands, US Virgin Islands, Anguilla, St. Martin/Sint Maarten, St. Barthelemy, St. Kitts & Nevis, Antigua and Barbuda, Montserrat, Guadeloupe, Dominica, Martinique, St. Lucia, St. Vincent and the Grenadines, Barbados, Grenada, Trinidad and Tobago)

- The Great Lakes in order of largest to smallest: Superior, Huron, Michigan, Erie, Ontario

- Super Heroes Must Eat Oats

- And in order from west to east:

- Shake My hand Evil Octopus

- A more common mnemonic for the Great Lakes, disregarding order:

- Huron Ontario Michigan Erie Superior: HOMES

- The principal factors affecting climate: LABDOWA

Latitude, Altitude, Build, Distance from the sea, Ocean currents, Wind, Aspect

- The countries bordering Germany (clockwise from north): Denmark, Poland, Czechia, Austria, Switzerland, France, Luxembourg, Belgium, Netherlands.
  - Do Polish Checks Always Say "France Look Back Now"!
- The traditional six counties of Northern Ireland are Fermanagh, Antrim, Tyrone, Londonderry, Armagh, and Down. FAT LAD.
- The northernmost countries of the African continent, from west to east: Morocco, Algeria, Tunisia, Libya, Egypt.
  - Most African Tourists Like Elephants.
- The southernmost provinces of Canada: British Columbia, Alberta, Saskatchewan, Manitoba, Ontario, Quebec, Newfoundland.

- BASMOQN, pronounced "Baz-Mock-Win"

== Geology ==
- Geological periods: Precambrian, Cambrian, Ordovician, Silurian, Devonian, Carboniferous, Permian, Triassic, Jurassic, Cretaceous; Post-Cretaceous Epochs: Paleocene, Eocene, Oligocene, Miocene, Pliocene, Pleistocene, Recent (Holocene)

- Pregnant Camels Often Sit Down Carefully, Perhaps Their Joints Creak? Possibly Early Oiling Might Prevent Permanent Rheumatism
- Paleozoic to Cenozoic: Pregnant Camels Ordinarily Sit Down Carefully, Perhaps Their Joints Creak
- Post-Cretaceous Epochs: Please Eat Oats My Pretty Pet Horse (Holocene)

- Mohs scale of mineral hardness 1-10:

For Talc(=1), Gypsum(=2), Calcite(=3), Fluorite(=4), Apatite(=5), Orthoclase(=6), Quartz(=7), Topaz(=8), Corundum(=9), Diamond(=10)
- Tall Girls Can Fight And Other Queer Things Can Develop
- TAll GYroscopes CAn FLy APart ORbiting QUickly TO COmplete DIsintegration
- Toronto Girls Can Flirt And Only Quit To Chase Dwarves
- Terrible Giants Can Find Alligators Or Quaint Trolls Conveniently Digestible
- Tall Gene Calls Florence At Our Quarters To Correct Dumbness

- Differentiating stalactites from stalagmites.
  - The 'mites go up and the 'tites come down. When one has ants in one's pants, the mites go up and the tights come down. (In a strict scientific sense, a mite is not an ant, although "mite" in common speech can refer to any small creature.)
  - Stalactites hang tight, hang down like tights on a line; stalagmites might bite (if you sit on them), might reach the roof.
  - Tights hang from the Ceiling, and Mites crawl around on the Ground
  - You need might to do push-ups (from the floor). You must hold tight doing chin-ups (off the ceiling).
  - Stalactites are on the ceiling. Stalagmites are on the ground.
  - Stalactites hang tightly ; stalagmites stand mightily.

== History ==
- Chinese dynasties (simplified): Xia (Hsia), Shang, Zhou (Chou), Qin (Ch'in), Han, Jin, Southern and Northern, Sui, Tang, Song, Yuan, Ming, Qing (Ching)

- She Shamefully Chose Chinese Hand Jingles (and) SiNfully Sweet Tango Songs: "You (and) Me, Chickadee!"

- English dynasties (simplified): Norman, Plantagenet, Lancaster, York, Tudor, Stuart, Hanover, Windsor

- No Plan Like Yours To Study History Wisely.

- Wives of Henry VIII (names): Aragon, Boleyn, Seymour, Cleves, Howard, Parr

- All Boys Should Come Home Please

- Wives of Henry VIII (manner of death): Divorced, beheaded, died / Divorced, beheaded, survived.
- British nobility rank order (simplified): Duke, Marquess, Earl, Viscount, Barons

- Do Men Ever Visit Boston?

- Assassinated US presidents and perpetrators: Lincoln by Booth, Garfield by Guiteau, McKinley by Czolgosz and Kennedy by Oswald.

- Losers Bearing Grudges Grieve Mainly Cowards Killing Orators

== Languages ==
=== English ===
==== Characteristic sequence of letters ====
- I always comes before E (but after C, E comes before I)

In most words like friend, field, piece, pierce, mischief, thief, tier, it is "i" which comes before "e". But on some words with c just before the pair of e and i, like receive, perceive, "e" comes before "i". This can be remembered by the following mnemonic,

I before E, except after C

But this is not always obeyed as in case of weird and weigh, weight, height, neighbor etc. and can be remembered by extending that mnemonic as given below

I before E, except after C
Or when sounded "A" as in neighbor, weigh and weight
Or when sounded like "eye" as in height
And "weird" is just weird

Another variant, which avoids confusion when the two letters represent different sounds instead of a single sound, as in atheist or being, runs

When it says ee
Put i before e
But not after c

- Where ever there is a Q there is a U too

Most frequently u follows q. e.g.: Que, queen, question, quack, quark, quartz, quarry, quit, Pique, torque, macaque, exchequer. Hence the mnemonic:

Where ever there is a Q there is a U too (But this is violated by some words; see:List of English words containing Q not followed by U)

==== Letters of specific syllables in a word ====
- BELIEVE

Do not believe a lie.

- SECRETARY

A secretary must keep a secret

- TEACHER

There is an ache in every teacher.

- MEASUREMENT

Be sure of your measurements before you start work.

- FRIEND

Fri the end of your friend

- SPECIAL

The CIA have special agents

- BEAUTIFUL

Big Elephants Are Ugly

- SEPARATE

Always smell a rat when you spell separate
There was a farmer named Sep and one day his wife saw a rat. She yelled, "Sep! A rat – E!!!"

- TOMORROW

I will go with Tom or Row.

- PRINCIPAL

The principal is your pal.

- BEGINNING

I will beg at the inn.

==== Distinguishing between similar words ====
- Difference between Advice & Advise, Practice & Practise, Licence & License etc.

Advice, Practice, Licence etc. (those with c) are nouns and Advise, Practise, License etc. are verbs.

One way of remembering this is that the word 'noun' comes before the word 'verb' in the dictionary; likewise 'c' comes before 's', so the nouns are 'practice, licence, advice' and the verbs are 'practise, license, advise'.

- Here or Hear

We hear with our ear.

- Complement and Compliment

complement adds something to make it enough
compliment puts you in the limelight

- Principle and Principal

Your principal is your pal
A rule can be called a principle

- Remedial and Menial

Remedial work is meant to remedy.
Menial work is boring but it's mean (-ial) to complain.

- Their, There and They're

Theirs is not mine even though 'I' is in it.
There is where we'll be.
They're is a contraction of 'they are.'

- Stationary and stationery

Stationery contains er and so does paper; stationary (not moving) contains ar and so does car
A for "at rest", e for envelope

- Gray and grey

Gray is preferred in America while grey is preferred in England

==== First letter mnemonics of spelling ====
- DIARRH(O)EA

Dashing In A Rush, Running Harder (or) Else Accident!
Dining In A Rough Restaurant: Hurry, (otherwise) Expect Accidents!
Diarrhea Is A Really Runny Heap (of) Endless Amounts

- ARITHMETIC

A Rat In The House May Eat The Ice Cream

- NECESSARY

Not Every Cat Eats Sardines (Some Are Really Yummy)
Never Eat Chocolate, Eat Sardine Sandwiches And Remain Young

- BECAUSE

Big Elephants Can Always Understand Small Elephants
Big Elephants Cause Accidents Under Small Elephants
Big Elephants Can't Always Use Small Exits
Big Elephants Can't Always Use Small Entrances

- MNEMONICS

Mnemonics Now Erase Man's Oldest Nemesis, Insufficient Cerebral Storage

- GEOGRAPHY

George's Elderly Old Grandfather Rode A Pig Home Yesterday.

- TOMORROW

Trails Of My Old Red Rose Over Window

- RHYTHM

Rhythm Helps Your Two Hips Move

==== Grammar ====
- Adjective order in English: OSASCOMP (Opinion, Size, Age, Shape, Color, Origin, Material, Purpose)
  - On Saturday And Sunday Cold Ovens Make Pastry
- Commonly-used coordinating conjunctions in English: FANBOYS
  - For, And, Nor, But, Or, Yet, So

=== French ===
- The verbs in French that use the auxiliary verb être in the compound past (sometimes called "verbs of motion") can be memorized using the phrase "Dr. (and) Mrs. Vandertramp":

devenir, revenir, monter, rester, sortir, venir, aller, naître, descendre, entrer, rentrer, tomber, retourner, arriver, mourir, partir

=== Spanish ===
- The informal affirmative imperative forms can be memorized using the phrase "Vin Diesel has ten weapons, eh?": ¡Ven! (venir), ¡Di! (decir), ¡Sal! (salir), ¡Haz! (hacer), ¡Ten! (tener), ¡Ve! (ver), ¡Pon! (poner), ¡Se! (ser)
- Contexts in which subjunctive mood is used can be memorized using the acronym WEIRDO: Wishes, Emotions, Impersonal expressions, Recommendations/requests, Doubt/denial, Ojalá

== Mathematics ==
=== Pi ===
The first 15 digits of Pi can be remembered by counting the letters in the phrase, "How I want a drink, alcoholic of course, after the heavy lectures involving quantum mechanics."

=== Quadratic equation ===
The articulation of the quadratic equation can be sung to the tune of various songs as a mnemonic device.

=== Mathematical operations ===
For helping students in remembering the rules in adding and multiplying two signed numbers, Balbuena and Buayan (2015) made the letter strategies LAUS (like signs, add; unlike signs, subtract) and LPUN (like signs, positive; unlike signs, negative), respectively.
Order of Operations
PEMDAS
Please - Parenthesis
Excuse - Exponents
My - Multiplication
Dear - Division
Aunt - Addition
Sally - Subtraction
In the UK, the phrase BIDMAS is used instead; Brackets, Indices, Division, Multiplication, Addition, Subtraction.

BEDMAS is more commonly used in Canada and New Zealand.

=== Trigonometry ===
The mnemonic "SOHCAHTOA" (occasionally spelt "SOH CAH TOA") is often used to remember the basic trigonometric functions:

- Sine = Opposite / Hypotenuse
- Cosine = Adjacent / Hypotenuse
- Tangent = Opposite / Adjacent

Other mnemonics that have been used for this include:

Some Old Hippie Caught Another Hippie Tripping On Acid.

Ships Of Holland Call At Harwich To Obtain Apples.

Sighs Of Happiness Come After Having Tankards Of Ale.

Some Old Hen Caught Another Hen Taking Off Alone.

Silly Old Hitler Can't Advance His Troops On Africa.

=== Topology ===
Mnemonics for Euler's characteristic are "fav.me", for "F add V, minus E", and "veryfun".

=== Calculus ===
The mnemonic "LIATE" is commonly used to determine which functions are to be chosen as u and d v in integration by parts.

- Logarithmic functions
- Inverse trigonometric functions
- Algebraic functions
- Trigonometric functions
- Exponential functions

== Medicine ==
- To remember the signs of a stroke:
  - FAST
    - Face (Has the victim's face fallen on one side?)
    - Arms (Can the victim raise both arms and keep them raised?)
    - Speech (Is the victim's speech slurred? Can they repeat a simple sentence?)
    - Time (It is time to contact emergency services.)
- To remember the steps for Resuscitation:
  - D.R.S. A.B.C.D
    - Danger (Check for danger to yourself or others before starting)
    - Response (Check for signs of life or response)
    - Send for help (Call for backup, or Emergency services)
    - Airway (Check for obstruction in the throat)
    - Breaths (Check for breaths)
    - CPR (Commence CPR)
    - Defib (Apply Defibrillator)

== Anatomy ==
- To remember the 10 organ systems of the human body:
  - NICER DRUMS (Nervous, Integumentary, Circulatory, Endocrine, Respiratory, Digestive, Reproductive, Urinary, Muscular, Skeletal)
- Intrinsic muscles of hand

A OF A OF A

Thenar (lateral to medial-palmar surface):

Abductor pollicis brevis
    Opponens pollicis
    Flexor pollicis brevis
    Adductor pollicis

Hypothenar (lateral to medial-palmar surface):

Opponens digiti minimi
    Flexor digiti minimi
    Abductor digiti minimi

- Muscles of mandibular nerve (V3 of trigeminal nerve) :
  Mylohyoid, Tensor tympani + Tensor veli palatini, Digastric (Anterior) – 4 Muscles of Mastication (temporalis, masseter, medial and lateral pterygoids

My Tensors Dig Ants for Mom
2 big ones, 2 small ones, 2 tensors, 2 pterygoids

- Bones of the wrist:
  Scaphoid bone, Lunate bone, Triquetral bone, Pisiform bone, Trapezium (bone), Trapezoid bone, Capitate bone & Hamate bone

Some Lovers Try Positions That They Can't Handle
She Looks Too Pretty Try To Catch Her
So Long To Pinky, Here Comes The Thumb
Simply Learn The Positions That The Carpus Has
Send Louis To Paris To Tame Carnal Hungers
Stop Letting Those People Touch The Cadaver's Hands

- Differential Diagnosis

VINDICATE

- Cranial nerves

List of mnemonics for the cranial nerves, their respective type and foramen
NERVE:	Olfactory nerve	Optic nerve	Oculomotor nerve	Pathic (Trochlear) nerve	Trigeminal (dentist) nerve			Abducens nerve	Facial nerve	Vestibulo-cochlear (Auditory) nerve	Glosso-pharyngeal nerve	Vagus nerve	Spinal Accessory nerve	Hypoglossal nerve
NERVE:	Olfactory nerve	Optic nerve	Oculomotor nerve	Pathic (Trochlear) nerve	Ophthalmic	Maxillary	Mandibular	Abducens nerve	Facial nerve	Vestibulo-cochlear (Auditory) nerve	Glosso-pharyngeal nerve	Vagus nerve	Spinal Accessory nerve	Hypoglossal nerve
Mnemonic: (for nerve)	OLd	OPen	OCeans	TROuble	TRIbesmen			ABout	Fish	VEnom	Giving	VArious	ACute / SPlitting	Headaches
Mnemonic: (for nerve)	On	Old	Olympus'	Towering	Top			A	Fat	Vocal	German	Viewed	A	Hop
TYPE:	Sensory	Sensory	Motor	Motor	Both (sensory + motor)			Motor	Both	Sensory	Both	Both	Motor	Motor
Mnemonic: (for type)	Some	Say	Money	Matters,	But			My	Brother	Says	Big	Brains	Matter	More
FORAMINA:	Cribriform plate	Optic canal	Superior Orbital Fissure	Superior Orbital Fissure	Superior Orbital Fissure	Foramen Rotundum	Foramen Ovale	Superior Orbital Fissure	Internal Acoustic Meatus	Internal Acoustic Meatus	Jugular Foramen	Jugular Foramen	Jugular Foramen	Hypoglossal Canal
Mnemonics: (for foramina)	Cleaners	Only	Spray	Smelly	Stuff	Right	On	Smelly	Idiots	In	Jumbled	Junkyards	Juggled	High
Mnemonics: (for foramina)	Carl	Only	Swims	South.	Silly	Roger	Only	Swims	In	Infiniti	Jacuzzis.	Jane	Just	Hitchhikes.

== Music ==
=== Bowed strings ===
- Mnemonics are used in remembering string names in violin standard tuning.
  - Good Dogs Always Eat
  - Greedy Dogs Always Eat
- Mnemonics are used in remembering string names in viola standard tuning.
  - Cats Give Dogs Advice

=== Guitar ===
- Mnemonics are used in remembering guitar string names in standard tuning.

- Every Average Dude Gets Better Eventually
- Eggs Are Deliciously Good Breakfast Energy
- Eddy Ate Dynamite Good Bye Eddy
- Every Adult Dog Growls Barks Eats.
- Every Acid Dealer Gets Busted Eventually
- Even After Dinner Giant Boys Eat
- Elephants All Dine Generally Before Eight
- Elephants And Donkeys Grow Big Ears
- Every American Dog Gets Bones Easily
- Every Angel Does Good Before Evil
- Eat All Day Get Big Easy
- Eine Alte Dame Geht Heute Einkaufen (German: an old lady goes shopping today)
- Een Aap Die Geen Bananen Eet (Dutch: A monkey that doesn't eat bananas)

Thus we get the names of the strings from 6th string to the 1st string in that order.

Conversely, a mnemonic listing the strings in the reverse order is:

- Every Beginning Guitarist Does All Exercises!
- Elvis' Big Great Dane Ate Everything
- Every Big Girl Deserves An Elephant
- Easter Bunny Gets Drunk At Easter
- Easter Bunnies Go Dancing After Easter

=== Ukulele ===
As for guitar tuning, there is also a mnemonic for ukuleles.

- Good Cooks Eat A-lot

- Gotta Catch 'Em All

- In the other direction it is Aunt Evie Cooks Grits

=== Reading music ===
E, G, B, D, and F

- Musicians can remember the notes associated with the five lines of the treble clef using any of the following mnemonics, EGBDF: (from the bottom line to the top)

- Every Good Boy Does Fine.
- Every Good Boy Deserves Fudge (or Friendship, Fun, Fruit, etc.)
- Eggnog Gets Better During February
- Empty Garbage Before Dad Flips
- Eat Good Bread Dear Father
- Every Good Burger Deserves Fries
- Every Good Bird Dresses Fly

F, A, C, and E

- The four spaces of the treble clef spell out (from the bottom to the top) FACE and can be remembered as FACE fits in the space (between lines)
- The five lines of the bass clef from the bottom to the top

- Good Boys Do Fine Always
- Good Birds Don't Fly Away
- Grizzly Bears Don't Fly Airplanes
- Great Basses Dig Fine Altos
- Goblins Bring Death For All
- George Bush Didn't Find Anything
- Good Burritos Don't Fall Apart
- Good Boys Deserve Fudge Always
- Garbage Birds Don't Fly Away

- The four spaces of the bass clef from the bottom to the top

- All Cows Eat Grass
- All Cars Eat Gas
- All Conductors Eat Garbage

- The five lines of the alto clef from the bottom to the top

- Fat Alley Cat Eats Garbage

- The four spaces of the alto clef from the bottom to the top

- Green Birds Do Fly

Key signatures of C♯ major or A♯ minor (left) and C♭ major or A♭ minor (right)
- The order of sharps in key signature notation is F♯, C♯, G♯, D♯, A♯, E♯, B♯, which can be remembered using the phrase

- Father Charles Goes Down And Ends Battle
- Father Christmas Gave Dad An Electric Blanket.
- Fat Cats Go Down Alleys Eating Birds.
- Fidel Castro Gets Drunk And Eats Babies.
- Fat Cats Greedy Dogs All Eat Bananas.

- The order of flats is B♭, E♭, A♭, D♭, G♭, C♭, and F♭ (reverse order of sharps), which can be remembered using the phrase:

- Battle Ends And Down Goes Charles' Father
- Blanket Exploded And Dad Got Cold Feet.
- Before Eating A Doughnut Get Coffee First.

- To remember the difference between the whole rest and the half rest:
  - A whole rest looks like a "hole in the ground", and a half rest looks like a hat.

=== Music theory ===
- The 7 modern modes (Ionian, Dorian, Phrygian, Lydian, Mixolydian, Aeolian, and Locrian) may be remembered in order with any of several mnemonics:
  - I Don't Play Loud Music After Lunch
  - I Don't Punch Like Muhammad A Li
  - I Don't Particularly Like Modes A Lot
  - I Don't Particularly Like My Aunt's Lasagna
  - Iron Door F(Ph)ridge Lids Mixup (Ae)oily Locals
- The 7 modern modes in brightest-to-darkest order (Lydian, Ionian, Mixolydian, Dorian, Aeolian, Phrygian, and Locrian) may be remembered as follows:
  - Lilacs In Malaysia Don't Always Provide Longevity
  - LIM DAPL (pronounced "limbed apple")

== Philosophy ==
- SPA is a mnemonic for the philosophers Socrates, Plato, and Aristotle in their order of appearance, Socrates first.
- THE LAD ZAPPA is a mnemonic for the first 11 (and most important) Ionian philosophers: Thales, Heraclitus, Empedocles, Leucippus, Anaximander, Democritus, Zeno, Anaximenes, Protagoras, Parmenides, Anaxagoras .
- THE PLAZA PAD is another mnemonic for the first 11 (and most important) Ionian philosophers: Thales, Heraclitus, Empedocles, Protagoras, Leucippus, Anaximander, Zeno, Anaximenes, Parmenides, Anaxagoras, Democritus.

== Physics ==
- Sequence of colours in a rainbow or visible spectrum (red, orange, yellow, green, blue, indigo, violet):
  - Richard Of York Gave Battle In Vain
  - Ring Out Your Great Bells In Victory.
  - Roy G. Biv is also used as a fictitious name
  - Raving "Oh, You're Great, Bradley!" Is Valid (from quiz show The Chase, referring to host Bradley Walsh)

== Theology ==
- STEPS (simplicity, truth, equality, peace, and sustainability) or SPICE(S) (simplicity, peace, integrity, community, equality, and, sometimes, stewardship); both acronyms representing the principal testimonies in Quaker practical theology.
- TULIP, summarises the core tenets of Calvinism: Total depravity, Unconditional Election, Limited Atonement, Irresistible Grace, and Perseverance of the Saints.
  - (Further memory peg: The economic boom that allowed the tulip mania in the Netherlands was ultimately enabled by the Calvinist work ethic.)

== Transportation ==
- Aviation uses many mnemonics in addition to written checklists. See also Category: Aviation mnemonics
  - CRAFT - Clearance limit, Route, Altitude, Frequency, Transponder.
  - pre-landing: GUMPS - Gas, Undercarriage, Mixture, Propeller, Speed.
  - pre-final: MARTHA - Missed (procedure), Altitude (limit), Radios (set), Time (limit), Heading (final), Airspeed (descent)
  - pre-high-altitude - FLOWER - Flow (enabled), Lights (test), Oxygen (charged), Water (humidity), Electricity (on), Radio (check)
  - pre-flight-paperwork - ARROW - Airworthiness (certificate), Registration, Required (charts), Operating (checklists), Weight and balance
  - night collision avoidance: Red, Right, Returning - Red nav light on Right implies target is Returning (closing)
  - radio loss Instrument course - CDEF - as Cleared, else Direct to last fix, else as directed to Expect, else as flight plan Filed
  - spin recovery - POKER - Power (off), Opposite (full rudder), Klean (flaps, ...), Elevator (briskly forward), Recover (from dive)
- Marine
  - "Red, Right, Return" reminds the skipper entering ("returning to") an IALA region B port to keep red markers to the starboard of the vessel. Conversely the opposite convention exists in IALA region A ports, where a similar (but significantly different) mnemonic of "Red on the Right Returning To Sea" can be used.
  - The phrase "there's always some red port (wine) left" is used to remember the basics in seafaring. "Red" refers to the color of navigation lights on the port (left) side of a vessel (as opposed to green on the starboard side).
  - "Nuclear Restrictions Constrain Fishing and Sailing, People Say" is used to encode the "order of priority" for which vessels have right of way (earlier in the list has priority over later): Not under command; Restricted; Constrained by draft; Fishing vessel; Sailboat; Powerboat; Seaplane.

== Units of measure ==
- Common SI prefixes:

- kilo-, hecto-, deca-, deci-, centi-, milli-, in descending order of magnitude:

"Base" (Meters, liters, grams) come in between "deca" and "deci".
- Kangaroos Hop Down British Driveways Carrying M&Ms
- King Henry Drank Both Diet Cokes Monday
- King Henry Died By Drinking Chocolate Milk

- deca-, hecto-, kilo-, mega-, giga-, tera-, in ascending order of magnitude:

- Decadent Hector Killed Meg's Gigantic Terrier

- deci-, centi-, milli-, micro-, nano-, pico-, femto-, atto- in descending order of magnitude:

- Darn Clever Mnemonic Makes No Prefix Forgettable, Absolutely

== See also ==
- Mnemonic
- List of firefighting mnemonics
- List of visual mnemonics
- Category: Science mnemonics
