= Kraft (disambiguation) =

Kraft, or Kraft Foods, is an American food processing conglomerate.

Kraft may also refer to:

== Companies ==
- Kraft Foods Inc, a former American manufacturing and processing conglomerate formed in 1923, renamed Mondelez International following the 2012 split
  - Kraft Foods Group, the company formed in 2012 when the original Kraft Foods Inc. was split, merged with Heinz to form Kraft Heinz in 2015
  - Kraft Heinz, the company the post-2012 Kraft Foods formed, after merging with Heinz in 2015
  - Kraft Foods Ltd, Australian company from 1935, which began as the Kraft Walker Cheese Co., a partnership between Fred Walker and Kraft Foods Inc.
- The Kraft Group, a group of privately held companies in sports, manufacturing, and real estate development
- Kraft Systems, a defunct joystick and radio-control transmitter manufacturer

== People ==
- Kraft (surname)
- Kraft Ehricke (1917–1984), German rocket scientist
- Kraft, Prince of Hohenlohe-Langenburg (1935–2004), German nobleman

== Other uses ==
- Kraft process, a paper pulp production method
- Kraft paper, paper produced by the Kraft process
- Kraft (Catch-22), a character in Joseph Heller's novel Catch-22
- Närpes Kraft Fotbollsförening, association football club from Närpes, Finland
- Team Kraft, Toyota semi-works Super GT team, see Ronnie Quintarelli
- Kraft (Lindberg), a musical composition created by Magnus Lindberg
- Kraft (album), an album by Vreid

== See also ==
- Craft (disambiguation)
- Krafft (disambiguation)
- Harry Kraf (1907–1989), New York politician and judge
