= James Kraft =

James Kraft or Craft may refer to:

- James L. Kraft (1874–1953), Canadian-American entrepreneur
- James E. Kraft, United States Army general
- James Kraft (politician) (born 1941), member of the Arizona House of Representatives
- James Craft, hostage to Holden–Keating Gang
- James Craft, one-time owner of Oakland Square Historic District
- Jamie Craft of Boston Renegades

== See also ==
- James Crafts (1839–1917), American chemist
- William James Craft (1886–1931), Canadian film director and screenwriter
