= Shirley Craft =

American politician

Shirley Ann (née Kreis) Craft (August 18, 1927 – May 8, 2010) was an American educator and politician.

Craft graduated from University of Montana and Colorado State University with degrees in business. She taught school in Ketchikan, Alaska and then served as principal of Joy Elementary School in Fairbanks, Alaska. In 1991, Craft was appointed to the Alaska Senate replacing Bettye Fahrenkamp who died in office. Craft served until 1993 and did not seek re-election. Craft died from heart trouble in Fairbanks, Alaska.
