= Per Krafft the Elder =

Swedish artist (1724–1793)

- Born: 16 January 1724; Arboga, Sweden
- Died: 7 November 1793 (aged 69); Stockholm, Sweden
- Education: Uppsala
- Style: portraitist
- Relatives: Per Krafft the Younter and Wilhelmina Krafft (children)

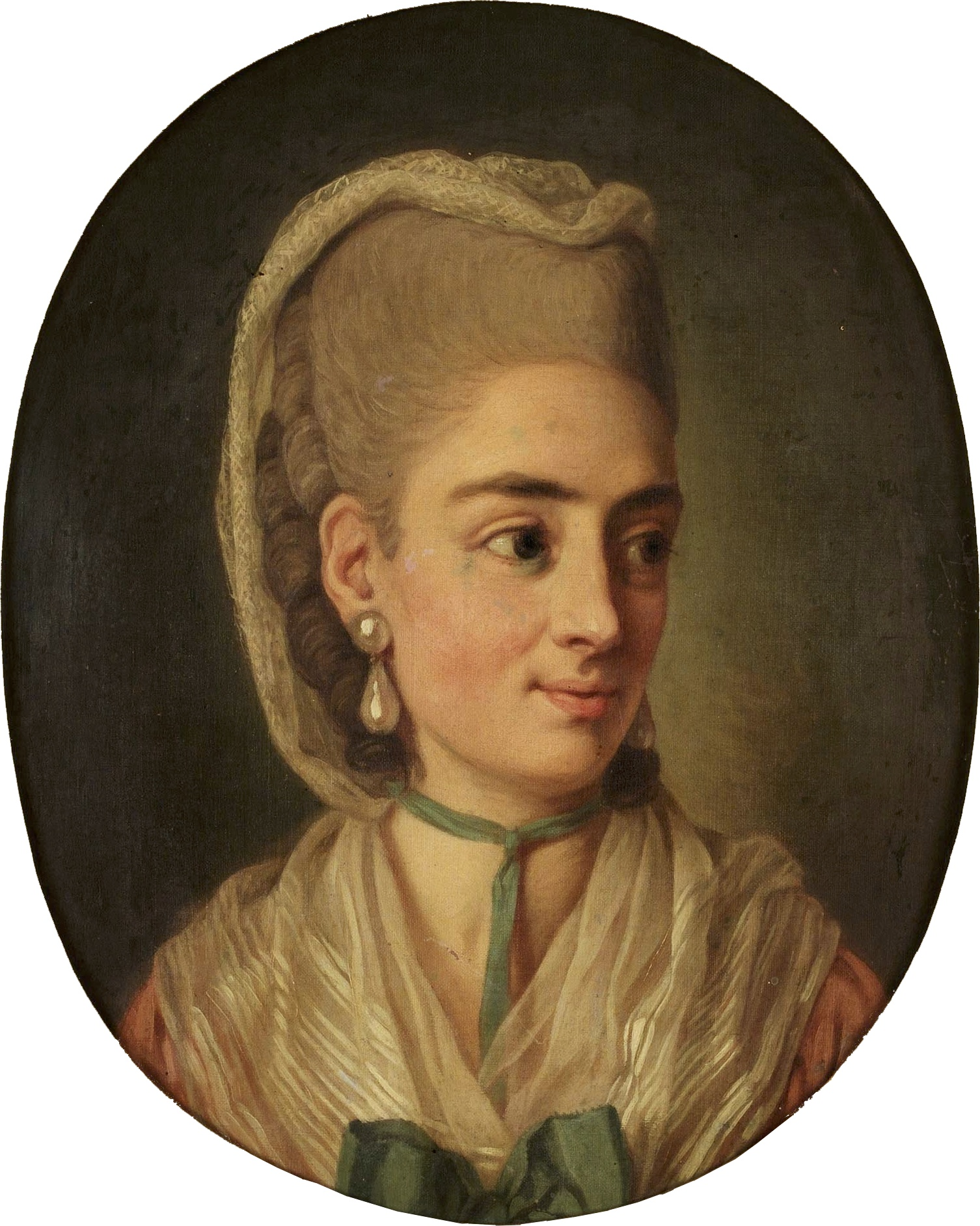
Portrait of an unknown lady by Per Krafft the Elder

Per Krafft the Elder (16 January 1724 – 7 November 1793) was a Swedish portraitist. He was the father of the artists Per Krafft the Younger and Wilhelmina Krafft.

== Early life ==
Per Krafft was born in Arboga, and studied in Uppsala, where from 1736 he became interested in the arts. From 1739 he was for several years a student of portrait painter Johan Henrik Scheffel in Stockholm. His self-portrait from 1745 and a portrait of his sister Anna Lisa (married name Askblom) show clear influences from Scheffel. In 1745 Krafft went to Copenhagen, where he came under Carl Gustaf Pilo's influence, as seen in the 1748 autographed portraits of Anna Bohr and a Miss Leijonhufvud as a shepherdess. In 1749, Per Krafft went to Skåne and painted Governor Wilhelm Lindenstedt's portrait in baroque style. Krafft had a patron in Denmark's then Finance Minister Otto Thott, for whom he copied several hundred family portraits at various Danish castles, which were collected in Gavnø. In 1752 Krafft painted the Count and Countess Thotts and their daughter's portrait, later kept in Gavnø and Frederiksborg Castle.

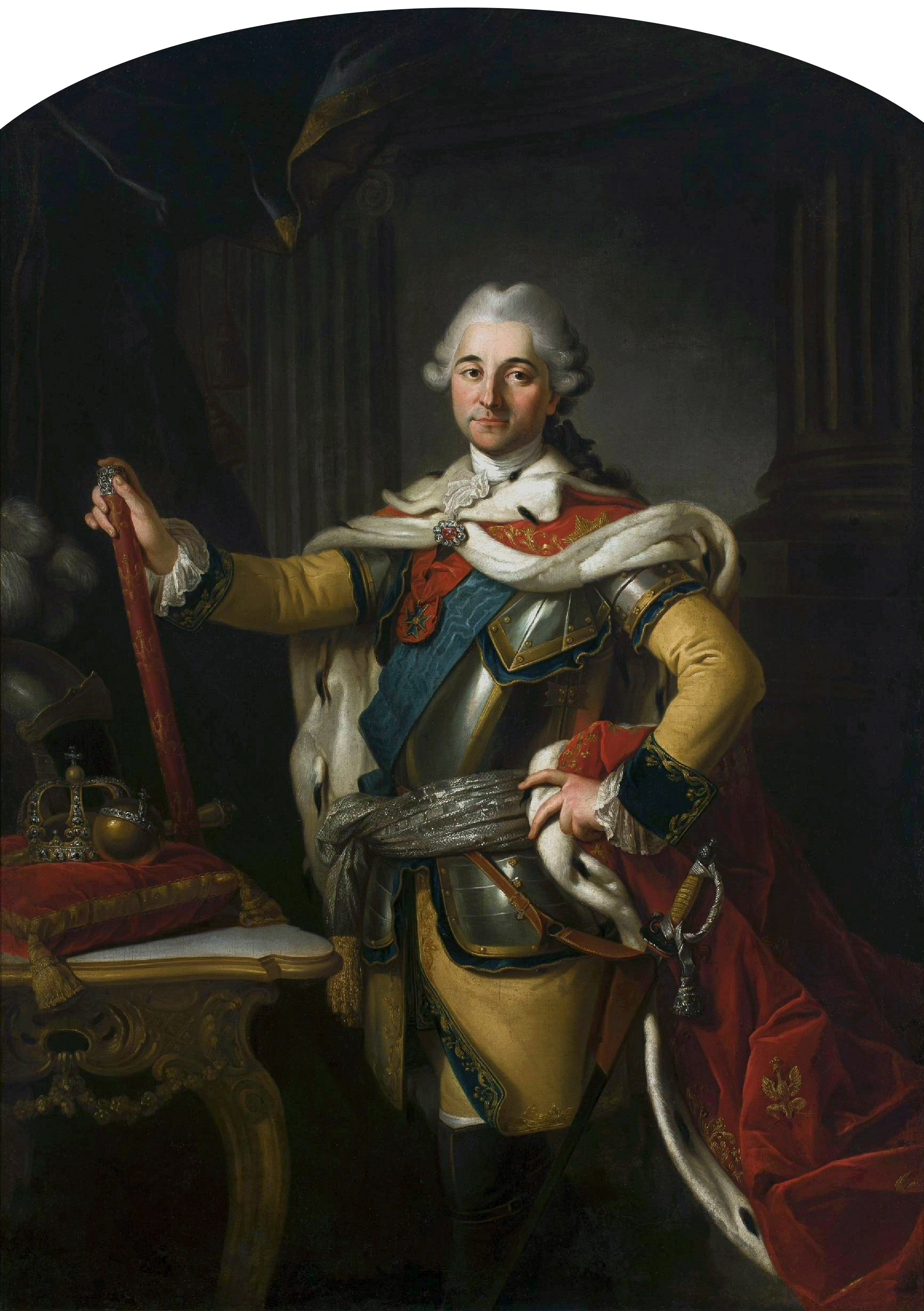
Portrait of Stanisław August Poniatowski by Per Krafft the Elder, National Museum, Warsaw, 1767

== Travel ==
In 1755 he traveled to Paris, where he became a student of Chardin. He later became a student of Alexander Roslin, a professor at Bayreuth and court painter to Stanisław August Poniatowski of Poland. Krafft painted in Paris included Count Nils Nilsson Bonde and some genre portraits, for example a Young Girl who Plays Lira (1758). In such images, he followed Jean-Baptiste Greuze's style, which was in vogue at the time. In 1762 Krafft was appointed as professor at the Margrave of Bayreuth's Academy of Art. Here he performed a brilliant portrait of the Duchess of Württemberg Margravine Elisabeth Fredericka Sophie of Brandenburg-Bayreuth, and a portrait of the Margravine's friend, the ambassador, Count Fr. Ellrodt.

Margrave Frederick's death dissolved the academy and the artists dispersed. Krafft then went to Italy, where he visited Bologna and Florence. After a new subsistence in Bayreuth, where Krafft again portrayed the Duchess of Wurttemberg, he went to Dresden, where he portrayed the minister, Baron von Fritsch. For the Polish king, Stanisław August Poniatowski, Krafft was called to Warsaw, where he painted in 1767–68 a pictor regius with a variety of portraits for the Polish court.

== Return to Sweden ==
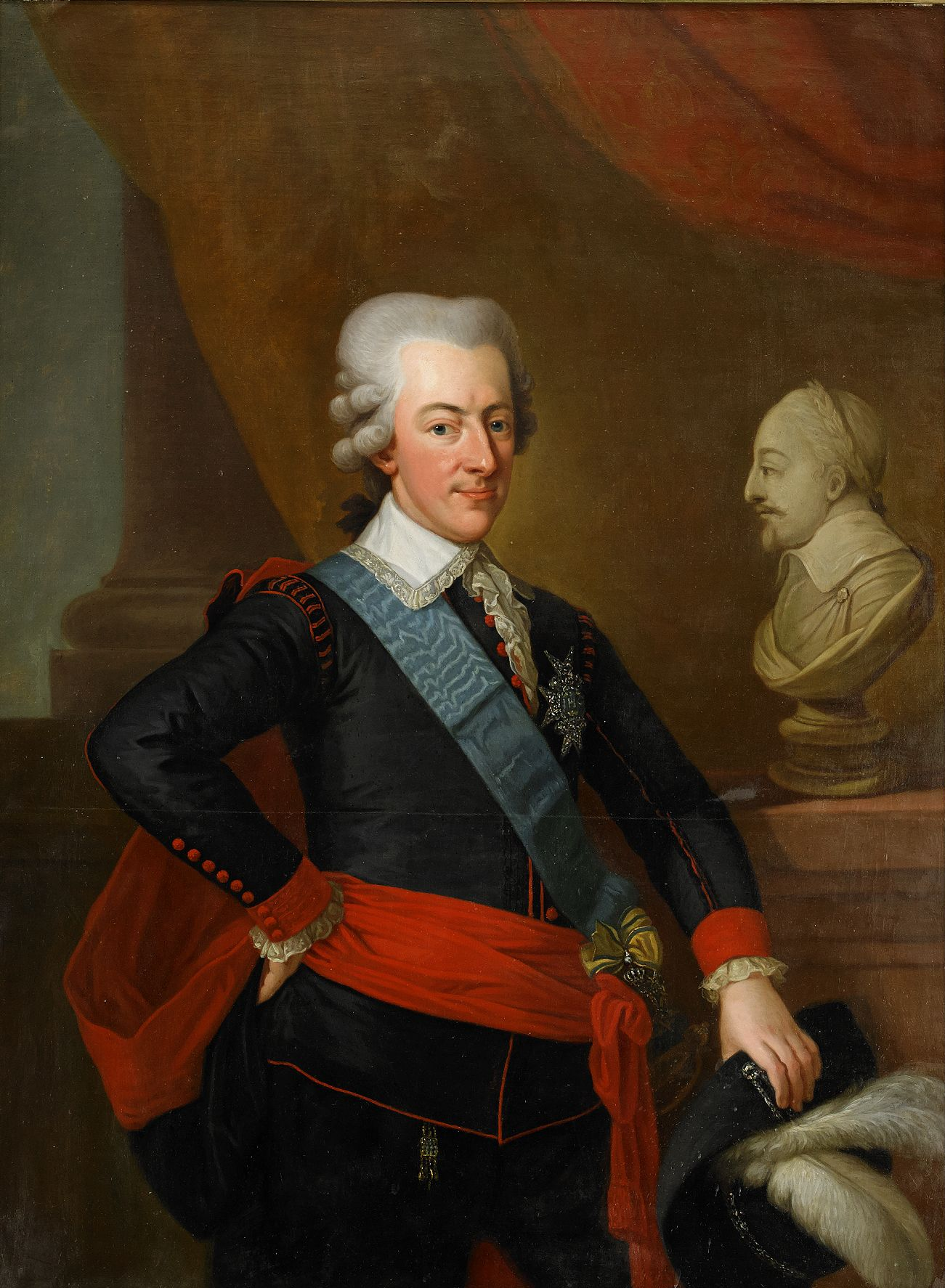
Portrait of Gustave III of Sweden, 1786

In 1768 Krafft returned to Stockholm after 21 years abroad. Pastel were now out of style, and oil paintings again in vogue. Before the portrait orders increased, Krafft undertook other assignments. In 1770, he painted an altarpiece for Muskö chapel. In competition with Lorens Pasch the Younger who painted the court and nobility, Krafft mostly painted the local bourgeois and scholars. He did portraits of Carl Christoffer Gjörwell Sr., Niclas Sahlgren, Emanuel Swedenborg, Sven Lagerbring, Carl Michael Bellman, Carl Linnaeus, Jonas Alströmer and peasantry President Anders Mattsson. At Uppsala University Krafft performed a couple of chancellor portraits, including King Adolf Frederick and King Gustavus III as Crown Prince. Later, he received more orders of King Gustaf III and his queen, and received the title of Professor in 1773 and was elected to the painting academy. At the Academy Krafft painted his self-portrait around 1775.

Per Krafft painted also Gustaf IV Adolf as a child and at 15 years of age, and portrayed Gustaf Philip Creutz and Elis Schröderheim and Anna Charlotta von Stapelmohr. Skåne castle hosts several portraits done by Krafft. Among his main works from later years include a full-length portrait of Georg Potocki, and several portraits for the family of his wife and children. His children have been painted by Krafft several times, sometimes both together.

He was the father of the painters Per Krafft the Younger and Wilhelmina Krafft. He died in Stockholm.

== Sources ==
- "Krafft, Per, the Elder". Benezit Dictionary of Artists. 2011.
- Carlquist, Gunnar, ed (1933). Swedish dictionary. Bd 15. Malmö Swedish Uppslagsbok AB. pg. 1173–75
