= Per Krafft the Younger =

Swedish artist (1777–1863)

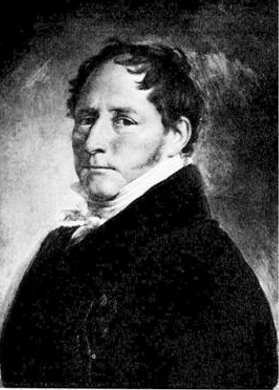
Self-portrait (date unknown)

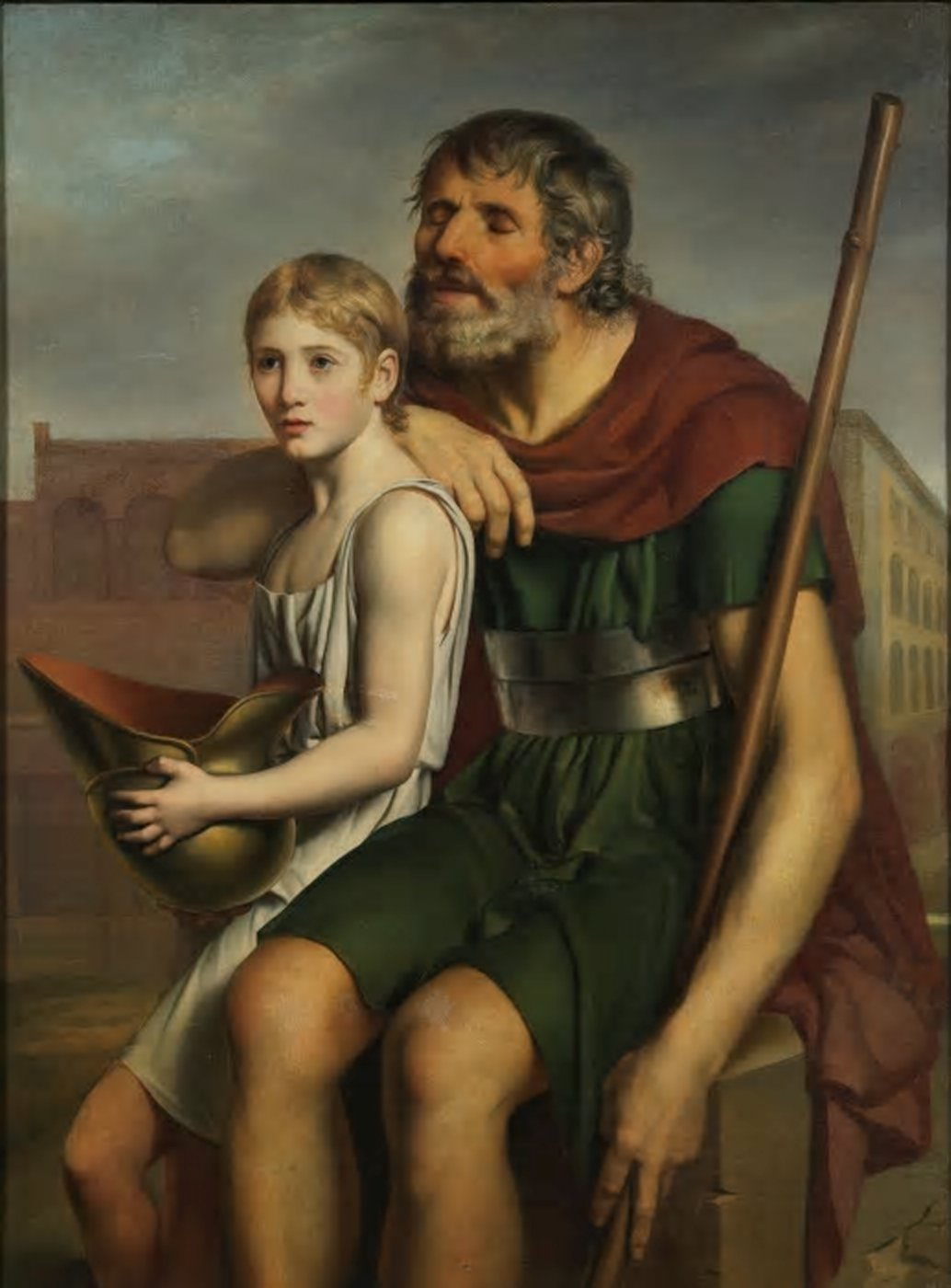
Belisarius (1799)

Per Krafft the Younger (1 November 1777 – 12 November 1863) was a Swedish painter of portraits and historical scenes.

== Biography ==
Krafft was born in Stockholm, Sweden. He was the son of portraitist Per Krafft the Elder (1724–1793) and Maria Vilhelmina Ekebom (1749–1820) and was the brother of portrait miniaturist Wilhelmina Krafft (1778–1828).

While still only a child of six, he began his studies at the Royal Swedish Academy of Fine Arts (1783–1796). He received his first medal in 1787. He studied there until 1796; notably with Lorens Pasch the Younger. At age 18, he was honored with a commission for a portrait of the powerful French politician, Francois-Emmanuel Guignard de Saint-Priest.

Shortly after, under the influence of Louis Masreliez, he went to Paris, where he became a student of Neoclassical painter Jacques-Louis David.

In 1801, for a major Academy exhibition in Stockholm, Krafft sent home three works: Belisarius, a smiling Cupid, and Paris as a shepherd; all composed in neoclassical style. In 1802 he traveled to Italy, where he drew cityscapes, studied the Old Masters and made copies of Raphael. In May 1803 he returned from Florence to Paris, where he became a highly sought-after portrait painter.

In 1805, he returned to Stockholm, where he had received an appointment as a court painter. In 1808, he was chosen as a Deputy Professor at the Academy and, following the death of Carl Frederik von Breda in 1818, was promoted to a full Professor of Drawing; a position he held until 1856

During his career, Krafft painted more than 400 portraits, including 60 drawings, and hundreds of other works. In addition, Krafft painted about 100 paintings with biblical, historical and other motifs.

== Personal life ==
Krafft married Brita Sofia Robsahm (1784–1854). He died in 1863 in Stockholm.

== Gallery ==
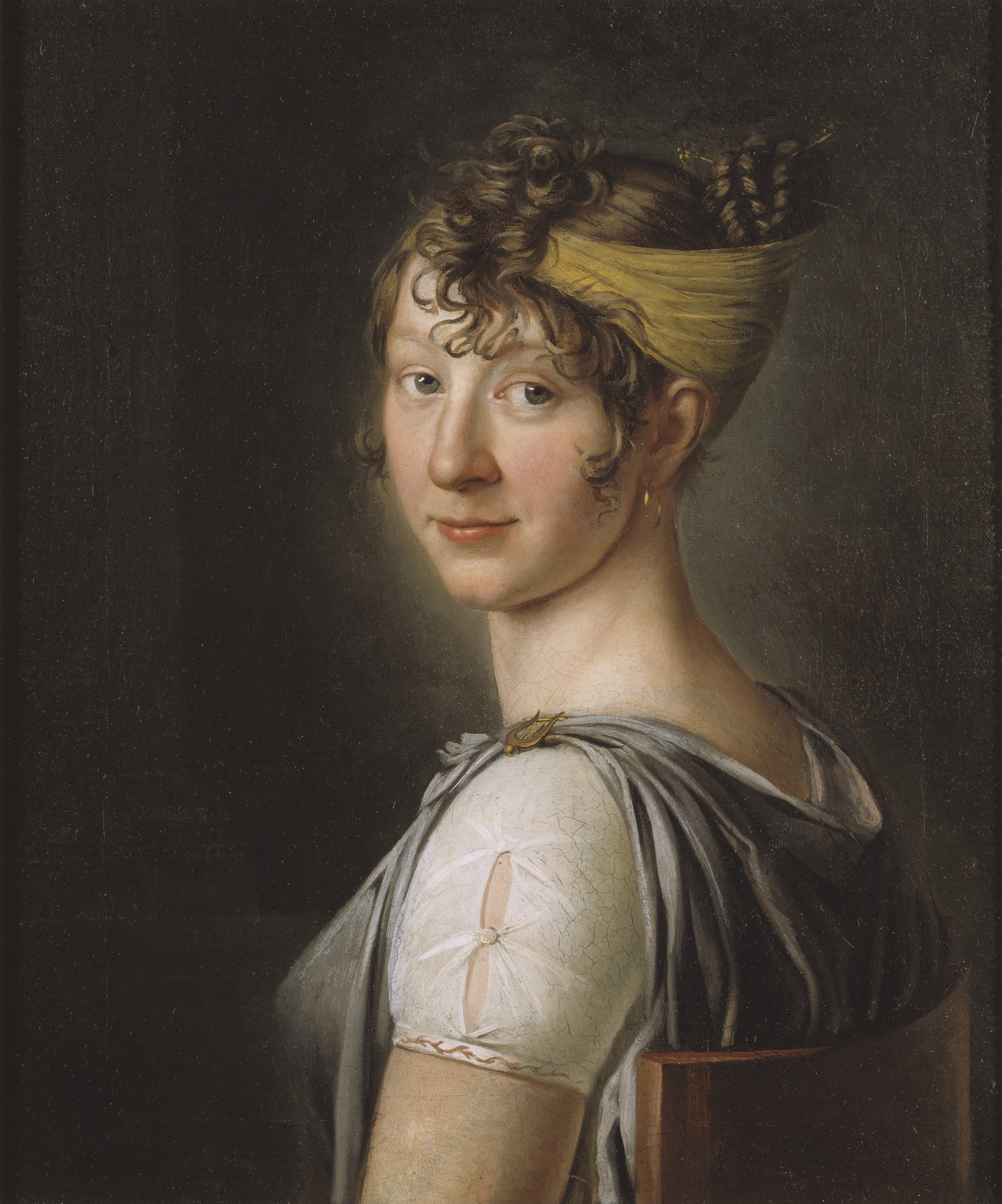
Portrait of the Artist's Sister Wilhelmina (1806)

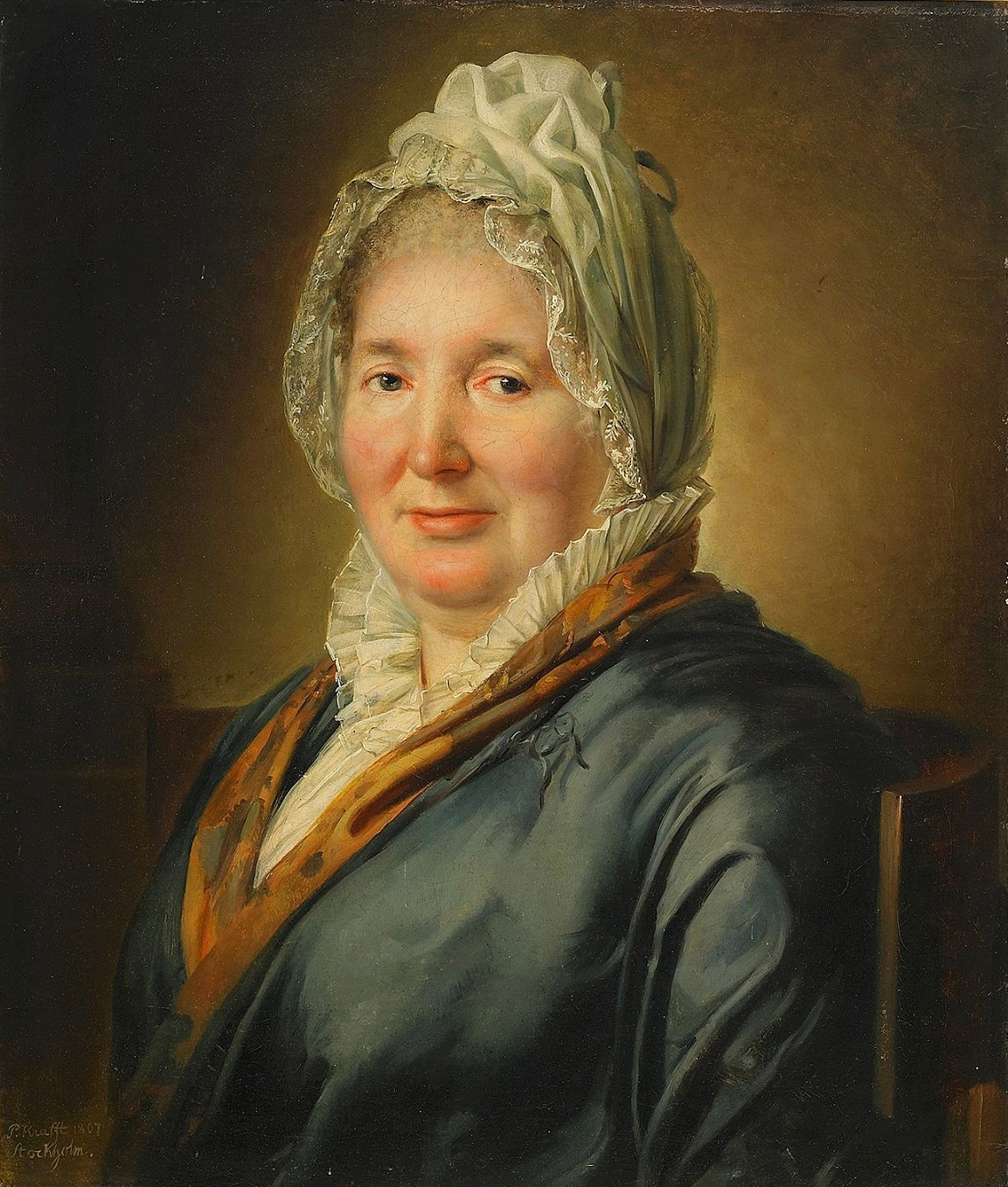
Portrait of Christina Hjorth

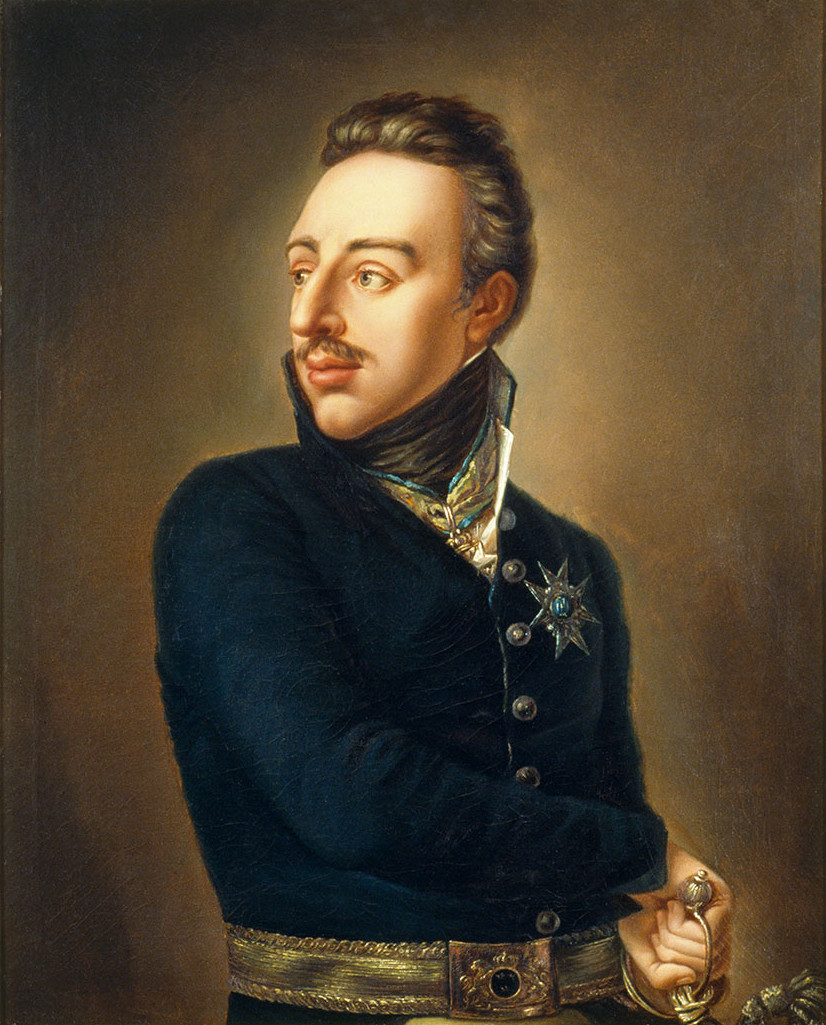
Portrait of Gustav IV Adolf of Sweden (1809)

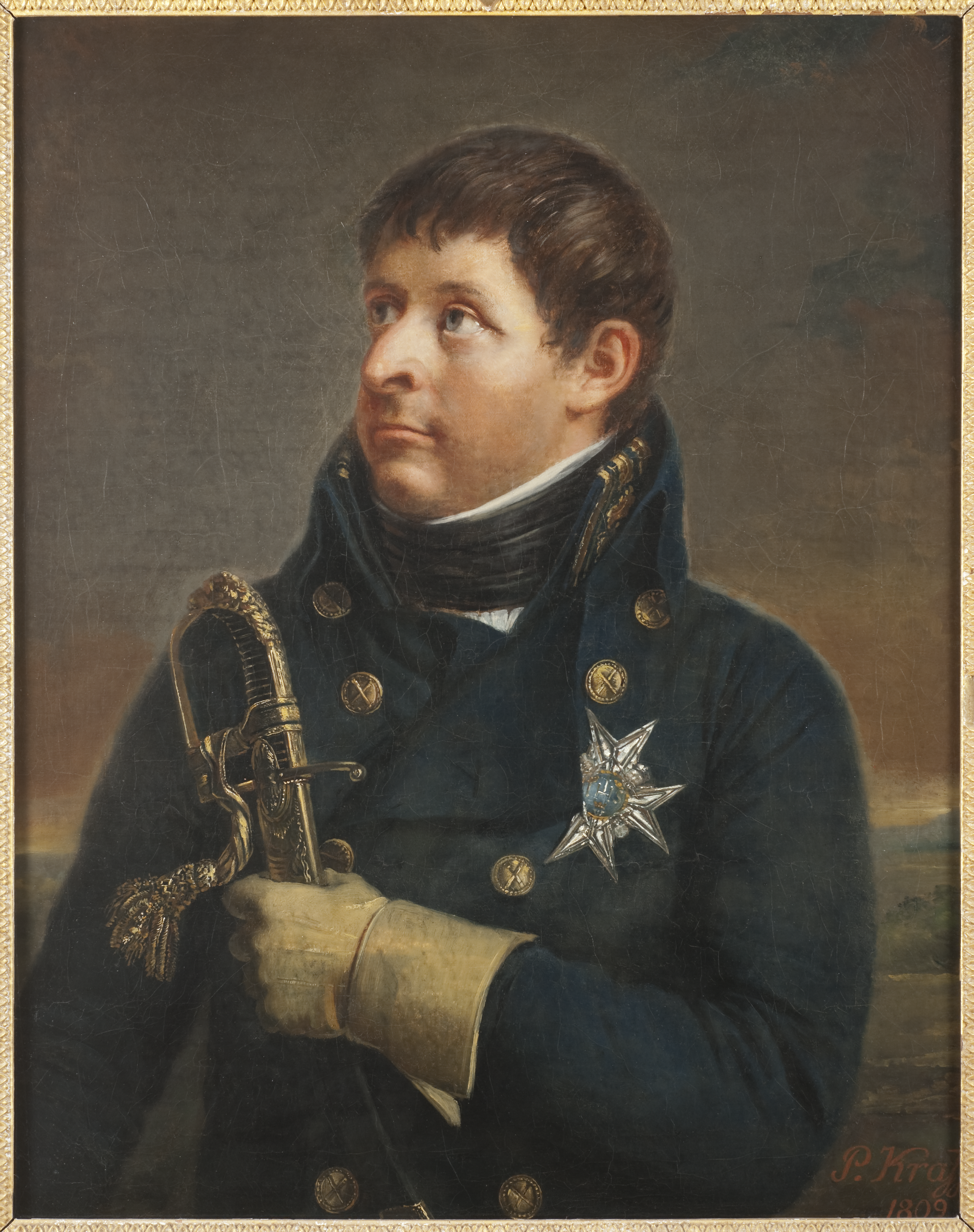
Portrait of Charles August, Crown Prince of Sweden (1809)
