= CRAFT (aviation) =

Aircraft clearance mnemonic

In aviation, CRAFT is a mnemonic for the essential elements of a clearance under instrument flight rules (IFR).

== Overview ==
CRAFT stands for:

- Clearance limit, the end point of the clearance (usually, but not always, the destination airport)
- Route, the route that the flight is to follow as part of the clearance (often the route originally filed, although ATC may change this)
- Altitude, the initial altitude to be maintained by the flight, plus, in many cases, a time at which cruise altitude clearance may be expected
- Frequency, the frequency to which the pilot(s) should tune upon leaving the departure airport
- Transponder code, the transponder code that must be set for the aircraft prior to departure and during the flight. T also stands for time, as in void time, if one is issued. A void time is an expiration time, meaning, the IFR clearance is voided if the aircraft is not airborne by the void time.

An alternative formulation adds an S for special.

=== Example ===
Consider the following example of an IFR clearance:

N12345 cleared to Las Vegas airport ,then as filed, climb and maintain five thousand, expect flight level three three zero one zero minutes after departure, departure frequency is one two four point five, squawk six five six two.

In this example, the clearance limit is Las Vegas Airport. The route is the HOLTZ7 Standard Instrument Departure, with a transition fix at the Daggett (DAG) VOR, and the rest of the route is as filed in the flight plan. The flight should climb to and maintain 5000 feet initially, and further clearance to FL330 may be expected (but is not guaranteed) ten minutes after departure. The frequency to which the crew should tune after departure is 124.50 MHz, and the transponder should be set to 6562 before departure. There is no void time in this example.

Note: This example is typical in the United States; phraseology may vary in other countries, although the essential elements remain the same. For example, European controllers do not generally specify altitudes or the departure frequency as part of the clearance. The initial altitude is sometimes stated on the charts. If not, it will be given by the air traffic controller. The departure frequency is given to the pilot when ATC hands the aircraft over to the next sector. A typical IFR clearance would be:

OOABC, cleared to Ostend via the DENUT 7C departure, climb flight level six zero, squawk four six seven four
