= Gian Antonio Lazier =

Italian pretender to the Byzantine Empire

- Prince of the Line of the Empire of the East
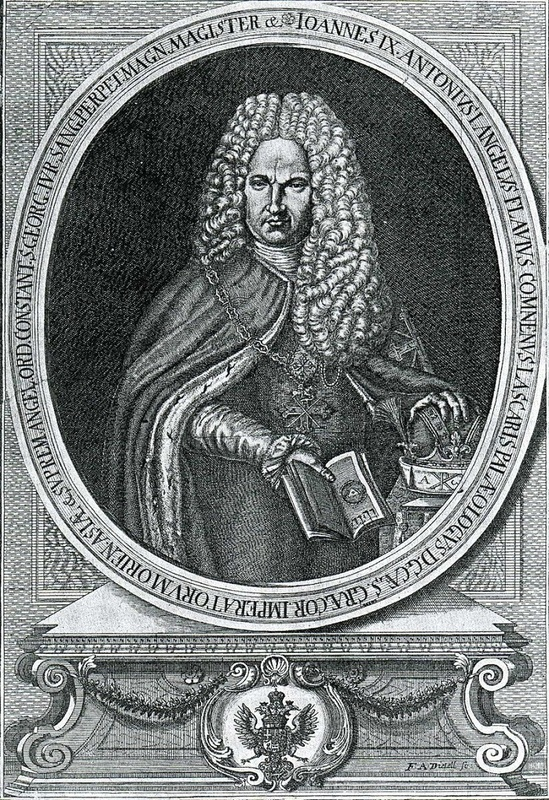
- 1722 woodcut portrait of Lazier
- Active: 1720 – 8 April 1738
- Born: 9 June 1678 (Note: This date of birth is first attested in late 18th century sources, and was repeated by later historians, but there is no contemporary evidence for it.); Perloz
- Died: 8 April 1738 (aged 59); Vienna
- Spouse: Marie-Marguerite Stévenin
- Father: Francesco Lazier
- Mother: Giacobina Neiro

Gian Antonio Lazier (9 June 1678 – 8 April 1738), also known under his claimed official name Ioannes IX Antonius I Angelus Flavius Comnenus Lascaris Palaeologus, and various variations thereof, was an 18th-century Italian impostor and pretender. Born of lowly origins in the Aosta Valley in Italy, Lazier claimed his last name to be a corruption of the surname Laskaris, an imperial dynasty of the Byzantine Empire. Also claiming connections to the Angelos, Komnenos and Palaiologos dynasties as their supposed last legitimate descendant, Lazier claimed the style 'prince of the line of the empire of the east'. Through various noble titles, Lazier claimed to be the rightful ruler of a vast number of former territories of the Byzantine Empire as well as of a selection of other eastern lands. He also claimed to represent the legitimate Grand Master of the Sacred Military Constantinian Order of Saint George, a chivalric order with invented Byzantine connections.

There is no evidence that either of Lazier's parents, Francesco Lazier or Giacobina Neiroz, had any connections to former Byzantine royalty. He may have had some form of relation to the Angelo Flavio Comneno family, an Italian noble family which claimed connections to the Angelos dynasty. Sometimes nicknamed "the peasant who wanted to become emperor", Lazier spent several years of his early life travelling around Italy in search of work he found suitable. In the early 18th century, Lazier worked as a shoemaker, lived as a monk, and then operated a hotel in Rome. In 1707, Lazier was condemned by the Inquisition for attempting to marry a young woman when he was already married to his wife, Marie-Marguerite Stévenin. At some point he moved to Brussels, where he began referring to himself as Ioannes Antonius Lascaris and began publicizing his pretensions and claims.

From 1720 to his death in 1738, Lazier operated out of Vienna as if he were a pseudo-Byzantine emperor in control of an imperial government in exile, with his documents describing his imperium Romano-Byzantium as a present, albeit virtual and landless, entity rather than as something of the past. Lazier's Byzantine aspirations went far beyond those of previous grand masters of the Constantinian Order. For instance, in addition to granting the typical ranks of knighthood within the order, Lazier also went further, granting several noblemen rights to estates and lands within former Byzantine territory. Lazier's activities, which until 1725 were fully recognized and supported by the Holy Roman emperor Charles VI, helped revive interest in the Byzantine Empire in Western Europe and might also have led to a late and ephemeral surge in crusading sentiments.

Lazier was involved in a propaganda war with the actual grand master of the Constantinian Order, Francesco Farnese. In 1724, Farnese successfully exposed Lazier as a fraud. Despite this, Lazier maintained a large audience of supporters who recognized his claims, even after Charles' support faded away in 1725. Undeterred by having his fraud revealed, Lazier maintained his claims until his death. Later grand masters and pretenders of the Constantinian Order did not continue Lazier's wide-ranging Byzantine aspirations, meaning that Lazier's landless and imaginary empire died with him.

== Background ==
Cross of the Sacred Military Constantinian Order of Saint George, a chivalric order founded in the 16th century with invented connections to the Byzantine Empire

The Byzantine Empire, the medieval continuation of the Roman Empire in its eastern provinces, ended with the fall of Constantinople on 29 May 1453, when its capital was conquered by the Ottoman Empire. The last emperor, Constantine XI Palaiologos (r. 1449–1453), died in the fighting. The last imperial territory, the Despotate of the Morea, ruled by assigned despots belonging to the imperial Palaiologos dynasty, fell to the Ottomans in 1460. (Note: The Empire of Trebizond, a Byzantine breakaway state founded in 1204 in the aftermath of the Fourth Crusade, lasted until 1461. The Principality of Theodoro, a former Trapezuntine vassal state, lasted until 1475.) Several members of the Palaiologos dynasty survived these events. In 1460, Thomas Palaiologos, former despot of the Morea, was welcomed in Rome by Pope Pius II (r. 1458–1464). Thomas and his son Andreas Palaiologos, who later proclaimed himself emperor-in-exile, spent much of their lives unsuccessfully attempting to secure military aid from Western Europeans to retake their former empire. Andreas' death in poverty in June 1502 left the line of succession uncertain and the title of despot of the Morea was on unclear grounds claimed by the unrelated Constantine Arianiti, an Albanian nobleman and military leader. Constantine already claimed to be the rightful ruler of several former Byzantine territories, having used the titles 'Prince of Macedonia' and 'Duke of Achaea' for several years by this point. Upon Constantine's death in 1530 his claims were inherited by his only son, Arianitto Arianiti, who however only used 'Prince of Macedonia'.

Arianitto died on 16 November 1551, ending the male line of the Arianiti family in Italy. Arianitto's titular position as the 'Prince of Macedonia' was taken up by Andrea Angeli, an Italian nobleman. Andrea was the grandson of Dorothea Arianiti, an aunt of Constantine Arianiti, meaning that he was Arianitto's third cousin. Andrea's family, the Angelo Flavio Comneno, claimed to be direct descendants of the Angelos dynasty of Byzantine emperors. This claimed descent is considered unlikely, especially given the forged genealogies published by the family. It is however possible that the family's earliest known member, the Albanian noble Andres Engjëlli (or "Andreas Angelos"), active in the 1480s, was descended from less well known children or cousins of the Angeloi emperors or perhaps descended through a female line. Andrea Angeli's claims were accepted in Western Europe without much dispute and he was officially acknowledged as a descendant of the Angelos dynasty by Pope Paul III (r. 1534–1549) and guaranteed the right to inherit territories in the former Byzantine Empire, should they be recovered from the Ottomans. The Angeli Flavio Comneno family thus for a time reached an unusually prominent position for self-claimed Byzantine descendants. Andrea and his brother Paolo founded their own chivalric order, the Sacred Military Constantinian Order of Saint George, with invented connections to Byzantium. Andrea and Paolo claimed that the order was not their recent creation but that it instead was of ancient origins, depending on the account founded either by Constantine the Great in the 4th century or by the later emperor Heraclius in the 7th century. The authenticity of the order was soon widely accepted throughout Europe. The last male member of the Angelo Flavio Comneno family, Giovanni Andrea II Angeli, transferred the rights of the Constantinian Order in 1698 to the unrelated Francesco Farnese, the Duke of Parma, and his descendants. Farnese's rights to the order were confirmed by Pope Innocent XII (r. 1691–1700) and Holy Roman Emperor Leopold I (r. 1658–1705).

== Ancestry and early life ==
Lazier was a native of the Aosta Valley in Italy

Gian Antonio Lazier was born in the Italian village of Perloz, near Aosta. He was born on 9 June 1678 according to late 18th-century sources, though his birth date is not attested by any known contemporary sources. His father's name was Francesco Lazier and his mother's name was Giacobina Neiroz. (Note: Both Italian and French were and are used in the Aosta Valley. Lazier's father's name was rendered in French as François Lazier, and his mother's name was rendered in French as Jacobée Neyroz or Jacobea de Neyroz.) In addition to the common rendition Gian Antonio, Lazier sometimes spelled his name as Gianantonio, merging the two first names into one, or rendered it in French as Jean Antoine. Though Lazier later claimed that his last name (sometimes alternatively spelled in the French variants dell'Ales or L'Asie) derived from the Byzantine name Laskaris (the ruling dynasty from 1204 to 1261), there is no evidence that either of his parents had any clear connections to former Byzantine royalty. Given Lazier's detailed knowledge of the Angelo Flavio Comneno family it is possible that there was some form of relation and that he claimed Byzantine ancestry through them. Perhaps Lazier was a relative or descendant of Marco Lazier, who had married Maria Altadonna Angeli, a cousin of Giovanni Andrea II, some decades prior to Lazier's birth. In reference to his humble origins Lazier has sometimes been nicknamed "the peasant who wanted to become emperor".

Tiring of his small village, Lazier left Perloz in 1702 and looked to find his fortune. He travelled to the nearby town of Pont-Saint-Martin, where he became an apprentice shoemaker. Not finding the profession sufficiently riveting, Lazier left Pont-Saint-Martin already on 1 August of the same year. He eventually settled among a group of monks in the Great St Bernard Pass and became a monk there himself on 7 May 1703. Monastic life did not suit Lazier either and he left the monks in 1704. In 1705, Lazier moved to Rome, where he on 5 March 1706 married Marie-Marguerite Stévenin. Stévenin was like Lazier a native of the Aosta Valley, hailing from a family of tailors, and owned a shop near the Piazza Navona. In Rome, Lazier socialized with the local aristocracy, making valuable acquaintances. He also purchased a previously German-owned hotel and on account of it made several trips to Germany.

In 1707, Lazier was condemned by the Inquisition for attempting to fraud a young woman, the daughter of one of the men in the service of the cardinal Gaspare Carpegna. Lazier, still married to Stévenin, had promised the young woman that he would marry her. As punishment for this attempt at polygamy, the Inquisition sentenced Lazier to seven months in prison.

== Career ==
=== Claims and recognition ===
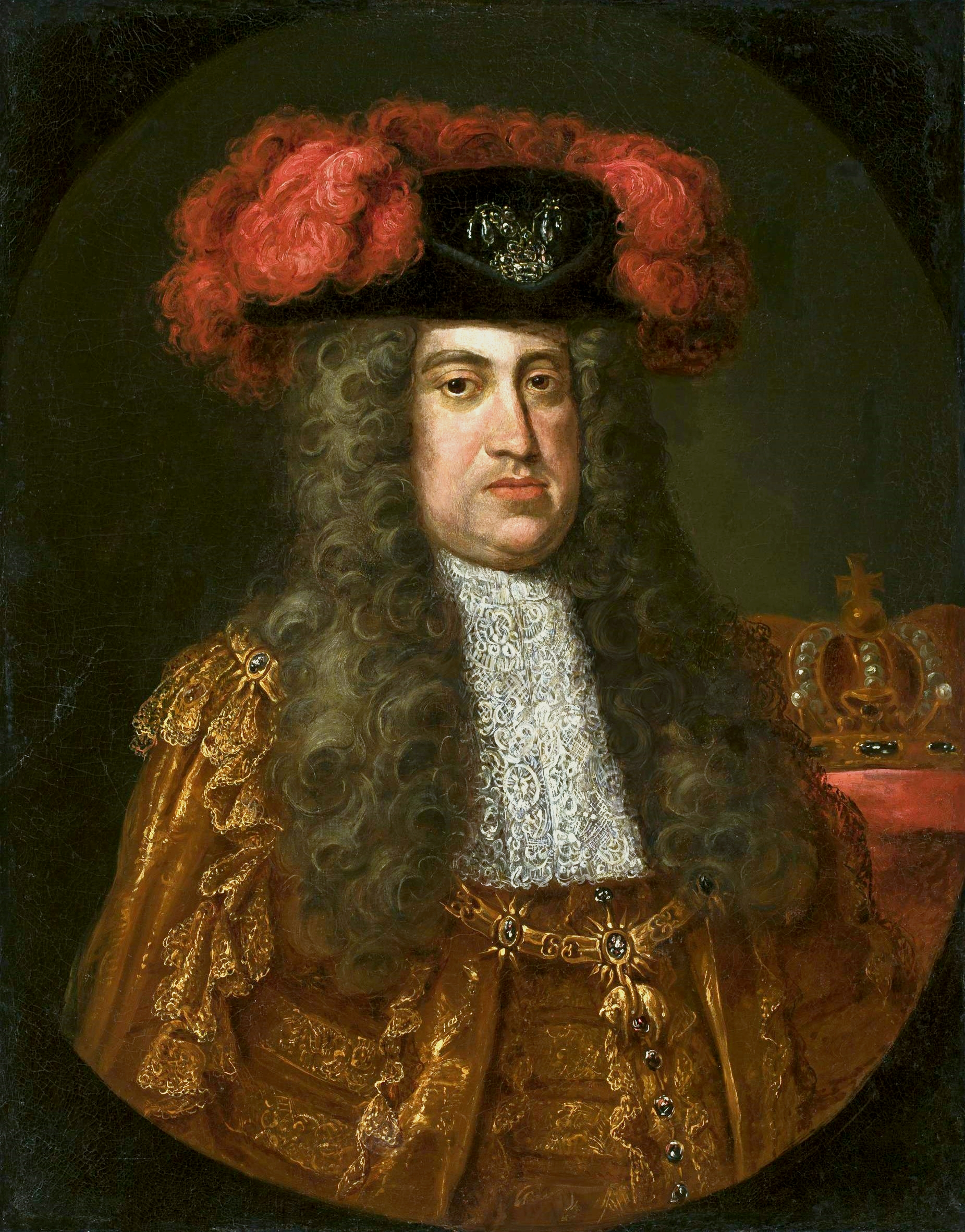
Portrait of Charles VI, Holy Roman Emperor (r. 1711–1740), who recognized and supported Lazier's activities from 1720 to 1725

Lazier eventually left Italy entirely and moved to Brussels, where he began referring to himself as Johannes Antonius Lascaris rather than Gian Antonio Lazier. From 1720 onwards, Lazier publicly challenged the claim of Francesco Farnese to the Constantinian Order on the basis that he was descended from the Byzantine emperors whereas Farnese was not. Lazier referred to himself as the last legitimate descendant of the emperors. Styling himself as Prince Giovanni IX Antonio I or Giovanni Antonio IX, (Note: Various variations of the formal name were used by Lazier. In addition to these Italian renditions, the Latinized versions Ioannes IX Antonius and Johannes Antonius are also attested, as is his original name, Gian Antonio. The number of last names used varied, ranging from three (Angelus Flavius Comnenus in Latin and Angeli Flavio Comneno in Italian) to five (Angelus Flavius Comnenus Lascaris Palaeologus in Latin and Angeli Flavio Comneno Lascaris Paleologus in Italian).) Lazier enumerated himself after Giovanni Andrea I Angelo Flavio Comneno (grand master 1592–1623 and 1627–1634), who in contemporary times enumerated himself as Giovanni VIII Andrea or Giovanni Andrea VIII after a sequence of invented ancestors. The number IX was used by Lazier as deliberate ignorance of Giovanni Andrea II, who had also enumerated himself as Giovanni IX. Why Lazier ignored Giovanni Andrea II in this manner is not known but perhaps it derived from Lazier questioning the legality of Giovanni Andrea II's decision to transfer the Constantinian Order to Farnese.

Despite the earlier position of the Holy Roman Empire in favor of Farnese, Lazier managed to secure the recognition of Holy Roman Emperor Charles VI and the imperial government. On 5 April 1720, Lazier received an imperial diploma which granted him the right to grant titles of nobility. It is possible that the motivation for Charles to support Gian Antonio was that Farnese had sided against him in the recent War of the Spanish Succession (1701–1715). Also of concern to Charles was that the Spanish royal family was in Farnese's direct line of succession, meaning that an enemy dynasty stood to inherit the Constantinian Order. From his recognition by Charles onwards, Lazier mainly resided in and operated out of Vienna. At this time, there was particular interest in Byzantine culture in the city. The Habsburg monarchy (the lands ruled directly by Charles) had enjoyed a string of military successes against the Ottoman Empire under the general Prince Eugene of Savoy, and an eventual "recapture" of Byzantine territory seemed plausible. The idea of Byzantium, in their minds a glorious eastern Christian empire, still enjoyed a major impact on European consciousness.

In 1724, Lazier claimed to have also been recognized by Maximilian II Emanuel, Elector of Bavaria. Lazier however never provided details or a specific date concerning this recognition and it is possible that it either never happened or that it was less formal than his recognition by the emperor. The first appointment to the Constantinian Order by Lazier was the Italian abbot Lorenzo Virgilio de Nicolis, appointed on 6 April 1720. In return for his appointment, Nicolis wrote and published a book in support of Lazier. In 1721, Lazier published invented genealogies in Regensburg, Bavaria, documenting his supposed Byzantine descent. His genealogies were backed up by an extensive number of forged diplomas and documents which served to indicate recognition of various invented ancestors by past popes and Holy Roman emperors. Lazier's recognition by Charles, his genealogies, and the book published by Nicolis increased Lazier's standing and influence. That Lazier attracted more widespread support as a result of these events can be gathered from the diversity among his appointees and the great number of decrees issued in 1722–1723. Many of the individuals appointed by Lazier were descendants or members of aristocratic families from the Balkans.

=== Pseudo-Byzantine emperor ===
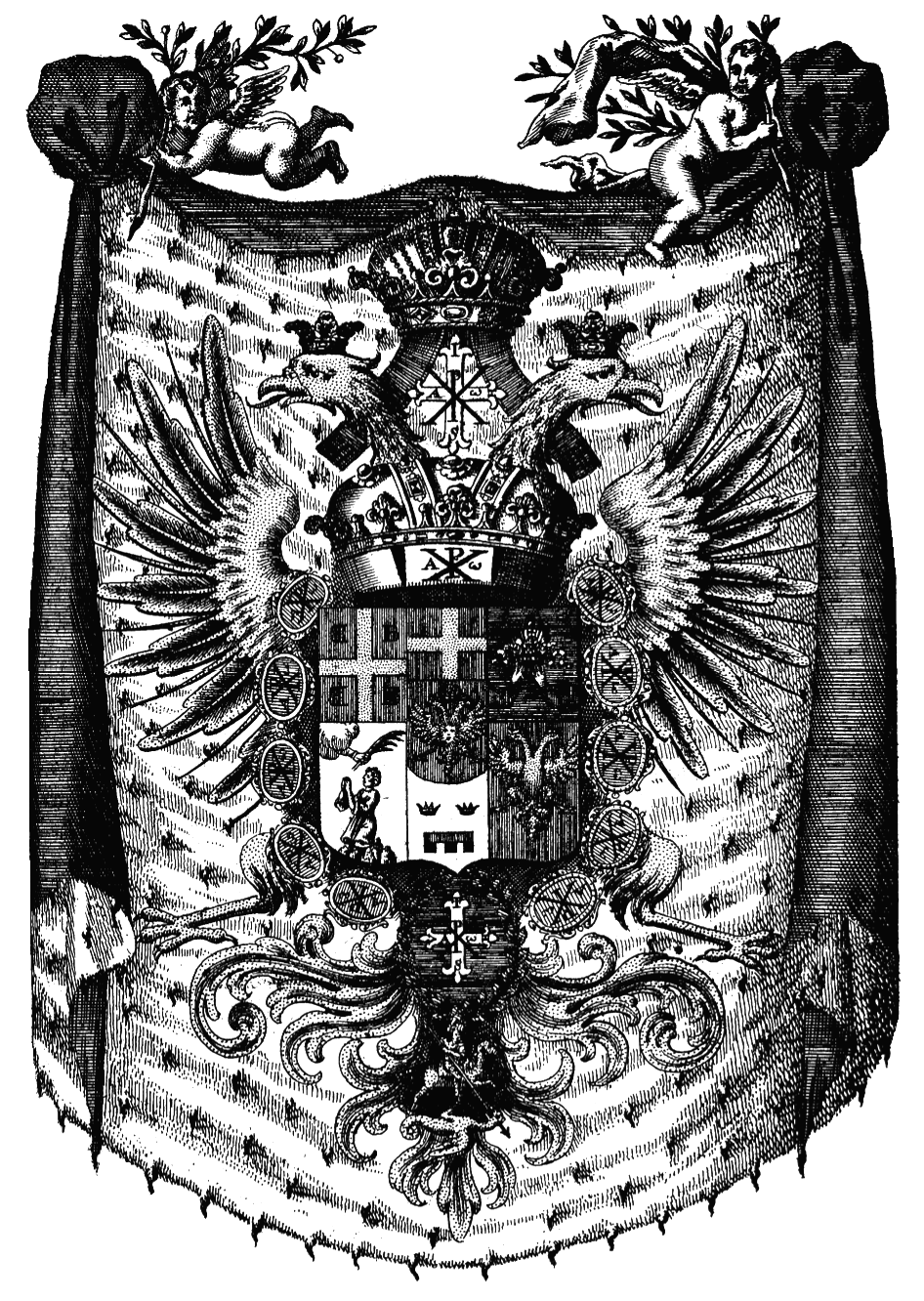
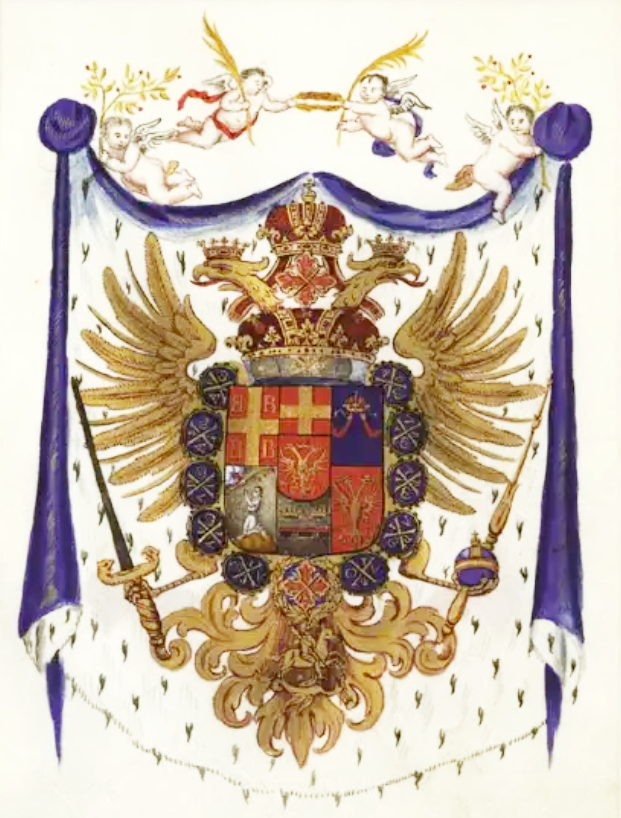
Two 1722 depictions of Lazier's self-assumed coat of arms

Lazier soon assumed a large set of Byzantine imperial dynastic names, claiming connections to the Angelos, Komnenos, Laskaris and Palaiologos dynasties. The publication of Lazier's genealogies ensured that his uses of these names were made more believable. In situations where only one last name was used, Lazier typically used either Lascaris or Palaeologus. The connection to the Angeloi and Komnenoi came from Lazier's claimed connection to the Angelo Flavio Comneno family, and the Laskaris connection derived from Lazier's own ideas concerning his last name. Lazier claimed descent from the Palaiologoi through an invented son of Theodore II Palaiologos (Despot of the Morea 1407–1443). Presenting himself as the rightful heir of the Byzantine emperors, Lazier styled himself as the princeps de genere Imperatorum Orientis ('prince of the line of the empire of the east'). He also claimed the titles 'Despot of the Peloponnese' and 'Prince of Thessaly and Macedonia', among others. Lazier's full titulature expressed the idea that all of the eastern Mediterranean, as well as vast territories beyond, belonged to him by right. One of the Latin renditions of his full title reads:

Dei gracia ex genere imperatorum Flaviorum Augustorum Romanorum, moxque Constantinopolitanorum ortus, jureque successionis hereditariæ actionis legitimus princeps Trapezundæ, Lazy, Mediæ Ciliciæ, totius Armeniæ, Medinæ, Jordanorum, Colchidis, Hyerosolimæ, insularum Cypri, Ægypti, Galatiæ, Daciæ, Heracleæ, Epiri, Candiæ, Peloponesi, Bulgariæ, Macedoniæ, Alexandriæ, Mesopotamiæ, Joniæ, Babyloniæ, Persiæ, utriusque Arabiæ ac totius Asiæ rex, magnus dux Isauriæ, Zechiæ, Chataniæ, Missiæ, Boetiæ, Bithiniæ, Paphlagoniæ, Lucæ, Onei, Synopis, Pamphiliæ, Anatoliæ, Hellesponti, Epidauri, Moldaviæ, Valachiæ, Corinthi, Thebarum, Athenarum & Larissarum princeps, liber comes insulæ Cephalinæ, Dirachy, Drivasti, dominus dell’Ales sive l’Asiæ, ex sacri Romani imperii proceribus ac comes Palatinus, imperialis supremi angelici & imperialis ordinis aureatæ militiæ Constantinani & Heracliani equitum sancti Georgi magnus magister.

From 1720 onwards, Lazier worked to reshape the Constantinian Order into a truly Byzantine-aligned institution. He sought to preserve Christian-Byzantine heritage and even worked to re-establish the Byzantine Empire in some form. Previous grand masters of the Constantinian Order had granted knighthoods of their order but not other types of noble titles. In his role of grand master and prince, Lazier went beyond the efforts of his predecessors, repeatedly granting noble titles attached to the Byzantine Empire. Over 50 documents issued by Lazier concerning appointments to the order or grants of nobility have survived, most as paper copies but some as the original parchments. In some cases, Lazier requested animals as payment for his grants, with records of requests for parrots and horses.

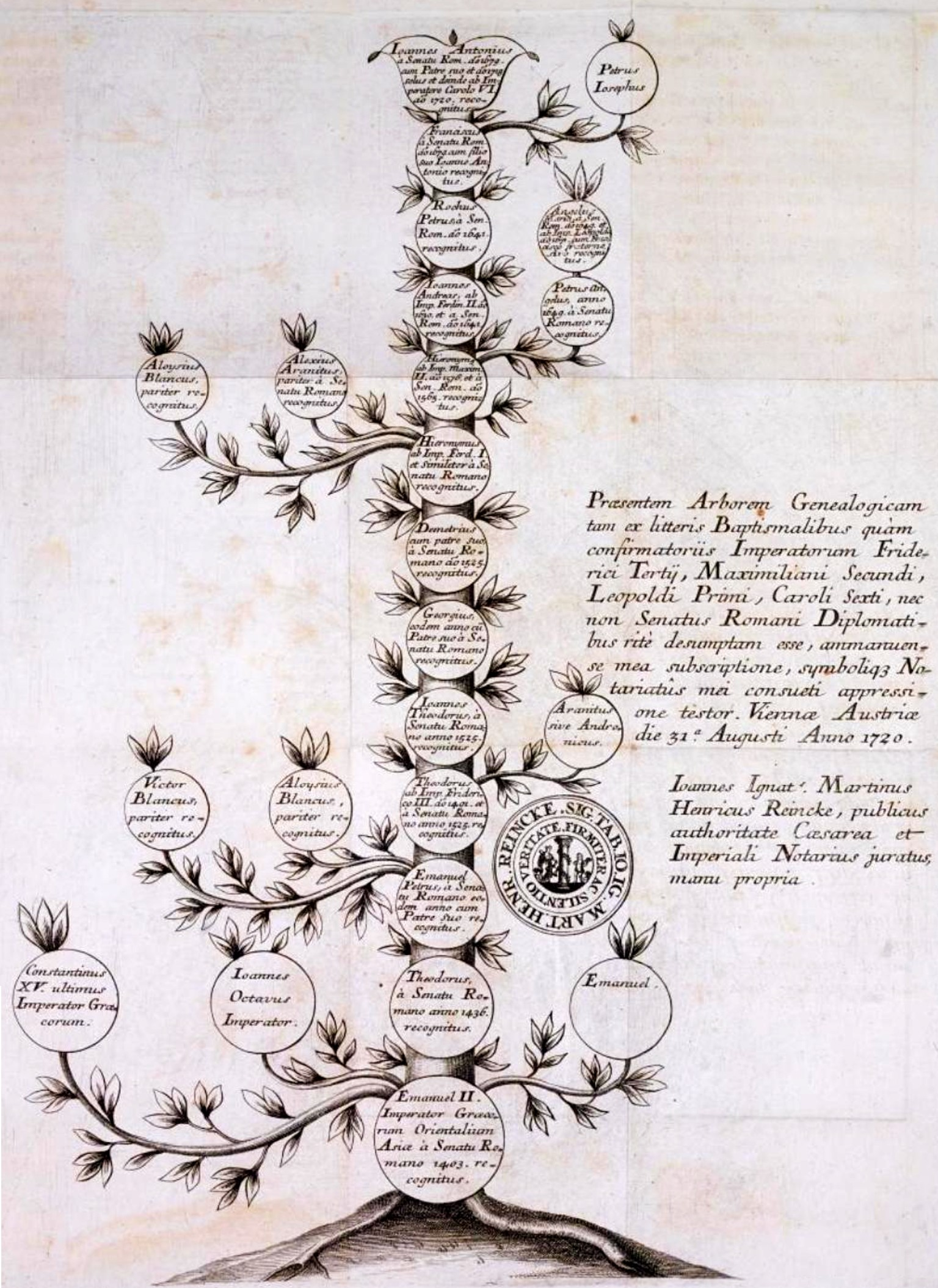
1722 genealogical chart, outlining Lazier's invented descent from Emperor Manuel II Palaiologos (r. 1391–1425)

In several cases Lazier granted rights to landed estates in his claimed lands, regions still under the control of the Ottoman Empire. There are records of lands in Ottoman-controlled Bulgaria, Dalmatia, Macedonia, and Epirus being 'granted' by Lazier to his followers. In one document, dated to December 1721, the brothers John Matthew and Peter Ludovisi, granted landed titles in the Peloponnese, are assured that as soon as the Ottomans are driven out from the peninsula, either through a peace treaty or force of arms, they will be instated there and be able to rule "forever". Lazier thus effectively operated as if he was a pseudo-Byzantine emperor in exile. Several of his own documents reference the existence of a virtual Byzantine Empire as a present (and not defunct) entity, effectively envisioned as a government in exile under Lazier. The German historian Christian Gastgeber considered Lazier's activities to effectively amount to both re-founding the Byzantine Empire as a political (albeit landless) entity and as marking the foundation of his own imaginary realm. Lazier used different terms for his landless empire, including imperium Romano-Byzantium, imperium sacrum Romano-Byzantium and sacrum Romanum imperium orientale nostrum Byzantium. Later texts typically also added the additional qualifiers Asiaticum and Trapezuntinum. According to Gastgeber, Lazier's activities further revived interest in the Byzantine Empire in Western Europe. The British author Guy Stair Sainty believes that Lazier's activities helped, if ephemerally, to inspire the crusading sentiment among Western Europeans once more. Gastgeber believes that if the Habsburgs had captured Constantinople and the surrounding territories, Lazier and the people he had granted titles to would have likely been instated as rulers there. Lazier's activities might also have contributed to a recorded increase in privileges and grants by the Habsburg government to the Greek minority in Vienna.

Lazier's determination and support by a figure as powerful as the Holy Roman emperor presented a real threat to Farnese's continued tenure as grand master of the Constantinian Order. Farnese worked to counter Lazier's propaganda publications by publishing propaganda of his own, commissioning texts to counter and debunk Lazier's claims. Although Lazier's position must have been considered doubtful even to his contemporaries, he was able to operate freely from the imperial lands of the Holy Roman Empire, which suggests that he enjoyed the full protection of Charles. Through some means, and despite the Spanish connections of Farnese, recognition of Lazier managed to extend to the Spanish media; in 1722, an article recognizing his claim was published in the government newspaper Gaceta de Madrid. Lazier was exposed as a fraud in 1724 by Farnese, whose investigations into the pretender had revealed both Lazier's original name and that some of Lazier's important documents were forgeries.

=== Later life and death ===
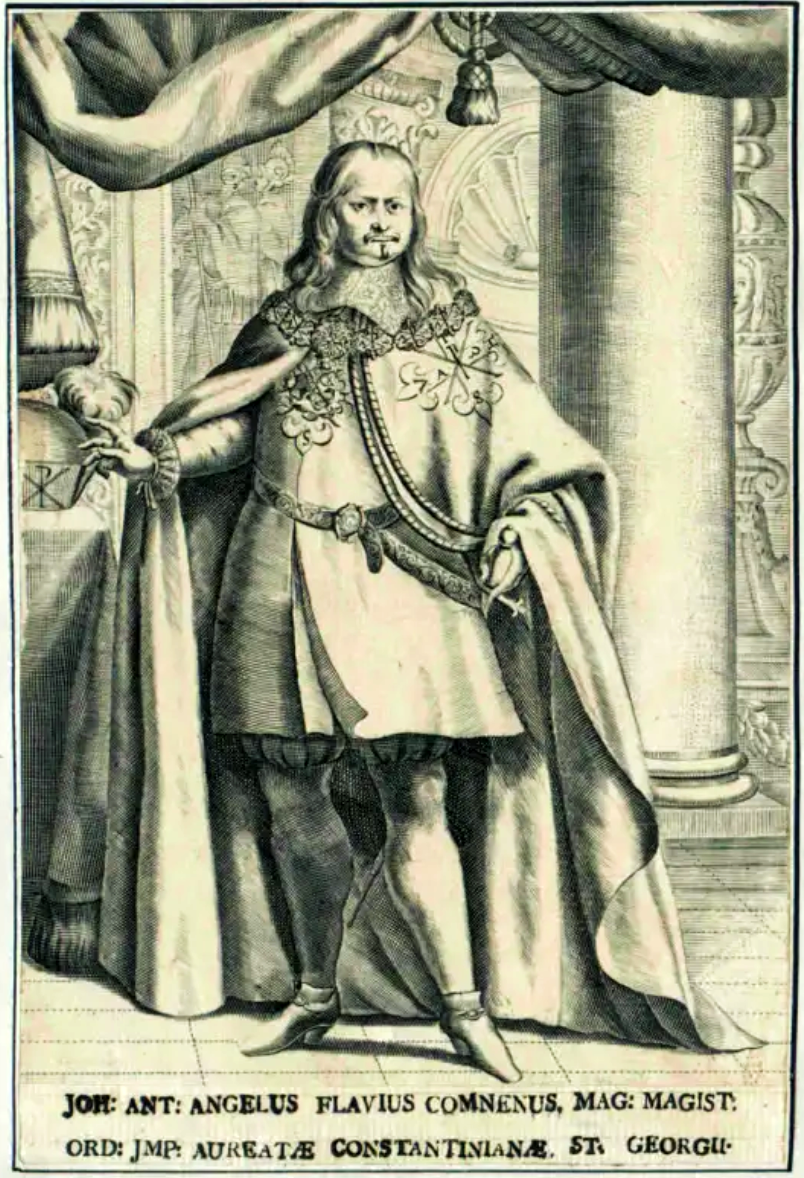
Another contemporary woodcut portrait depicting Lazier

Farnese's investigation and propaganda did not succeed in immediately discrediting Lazier. Some third-party writings concerning the Constantinian Order written as late as 1733 still refer to the ongoing dispute between Farnese and Lazier, as if the two claimants both held legitimate claims to the position of grand master. In 1725, the Holy Roman Empire and Spain forged a peace through the treaties of the Peace of Vienna. Imperial support and recognition of Lazier appears to have faded away around this time, perhaps partly due to Lazier's forgeries being exposed. Imperial support appears to have been fully gone by 1735; some sources suggest that Charles in that year bestowed the position of grand master of the Constantinian Order upon Radu Cantacuzino, who claimed descent from the Byzantine Kantakouzenos family. Radu Cantacuzino, who used the full Latinized name Ioannes Rodolphus Contacuzenus Angelus Flavius Comnenus, was a forger similar to Lazier and he had claimed Byzantine ancestry and dignity for several years prior to receiving Charles' recognition.

Lazier died on 8 April 1738 in the Dominikanerkonvent in Vienna, a Dominican monastery. It is unknown what Lazier was doing in the monastery. Though his support had faded and he had grown poor, Lazier continued his pretensions until his death and he died with a still sizeable audience that recognized him as the legitimate grand master and a true descendant of the Byzantine emperors. Lazier's last known decree issued as grand master is from 3 January 1738, mere months before his death. Succeeding grand masters of the Constantinian Order, both legitimate and forgers, did not follow Lazier's wide-ranging Byzantine aspirations. Though Radu Cantacuzino adopted some of Lazier's self-proclaimed titles, such as 'Despot of the Peloponnese' and 'Prince of Thessaly and Macedonia', this means that Lazier's imperium Romano-Byzantium died with him in 1738.
