= Giovanni Andrea II Angeli =

- Prince of Macedonia; Duke and Count of Drivasto and Durazzo
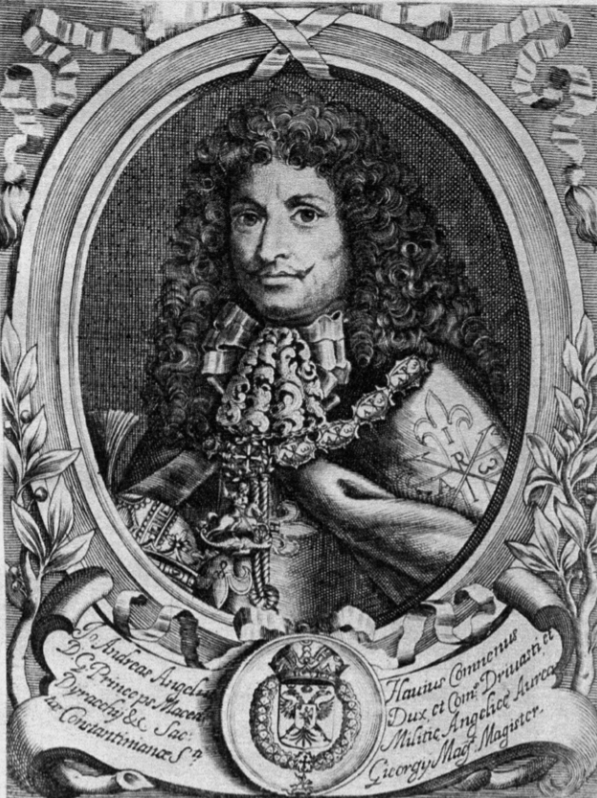
- Contemporary woodcut portrait of Giovanni Andrea II

Grand Master of the Constantinian Order of Saint George
- Tenure: 1687–1698
- Predecessor: Girolamo II Angeli
- Successor: Francesco Farnese
- Born: 1634
- Died: 8 April 1703 (aged 68–69)
- Spouse: Virginia Giovanna Mandricardi
- House: Angelo Flavio Comneno
- Father: Andrea Angeli

Giovanni Andrea II Angelo Flavio Comneno (Latin: Joannes Andreas Angelus Flavius Comnenus; 1634 – 8 April 1703) was the Grand Master of the Constantinian Order of Saint George from 1687 to 1698. Giovanni Andrea's family, the Angelo Flavio Comneno, claimed descent from the Angelos dynasty of Byzantine emperors, and Giovanni Andrea also claimed the titles "Prince of Macedonia" and "Duke and Count of Drivasto and Durazzo". The last male member of his family, Giovanni Andrea was the last grand master descended from the order's founder, Andrea Angeli. In 1687, Giovanni Andrea sold the position of grand master to Francesco Farnese, the Duke of Parma, and thereafter lived as a castellan in Piacenza.

== Biography ==
Giovanni Andrea was born in 1634, as the third and youngest son of Andrea Angeli, who in turn was the youngest son of the grand master Girolamo I Angeli (1505–1591). Giovanni Andrea's family, the Angelo Flavio Comneno, claimed descent from the Angelos dynasty of Byzantine emperors. In the mid-15th century, Andrea's uncles Andrea and Paolo were officially acknowledged as descendants of the Angelos emperors by Pope Paul III (r. 1534–1549) and founded the Sacred Military Constantinian Order of Saint George, a chivalric order with invented Byzantine connections.

=== Grand master ===
As the last living male member of his family, Giovanni Andrea became the Grand Master of the Constantinian Order of Saint George upon the death of his older brother, Girolamo II Angeli, in 1687. Though he was the second of his name to serve as the head of his family (thus in modern times being enumerated as Giovanni Andrea II), Giovanni Andrea claimed the style Giovanni Andrea IX, enumerating himself after an invented sequence of ancestors.

Giovanni Andrea's tenure as grand master saw a continuation of the warm relationship between his ancestors and Leopold I, Holy Roman Emperor (r. 1658–1705), who recognized Giovanni Andrea's accession to grand master, and he also established warm relations with John III Sobieski, King of Poland (r. 1674–1696). Through financial aid from his monarchical acquaintances, Giovanni Andrea successfully established a small regiment of soldiers, which was sent to fight the Ottoman Empire in the Great Turkish War under a commanding officer directly appointed by Giovanni Andrea. Giovanni Andrea was also a friend of Leopold's third wife, Eleonore Magdalene of Neuburg; preserved in the archives of the Constantinian Order are a 1687 letter to Girolamo II and Giovanni Andrea, informing them of recent victories against the Ottomans, as well as a 1692 letter to Giovanni Andrea with Christmas greetings.

=== Sale of the Constantinian Order ===
Already relatively old and childless, without living male relatives, Giovanni Andrea made several attempts to relinquish his position as grand master to a sovereign or state in exchange for an appropriate pension. Failed attempts were made to grant the position and the order to the Republic of Venice, Leopold I of the Holy Roman Empire and Gustav, Duke of Zweibrücken. Giovanni Andrea eventually found his candidate: Francesco Farnese, the Duke of Parma, who was eager to increase his status and glory. Farnese was enormously wealthy, but hoped that the dignity of grand master, in the case of the Constantinian Order viewed as a potent symbol of royal status, would bring him greater prestige than his current rank as the ruler of two small duchies. To further cement his claim in the eyes of the nobility of Europe, Francesco produced a family tree showcasing his descent from the Byzantine emperor Isaac II Angelos through a female line, an actual genuine line of descent (though Francesco was far from alone in Europe as a female-line descendant of Isaac), though Farnese also embellished the genealogy by linking himself to Constantine the Great. The genealogy was meant to cement Farnese not only as a purchaser of the rank of grand master, but also as someone who could legitimately claim to succeed Giovanni Andrea.

In 1698, Giovanni Andrea granted the rights to the grand mastership of his order to Francesco Farnese, the Duke of Parma. Farnese's rights were confirmed both by Pope Innocent XII and Holy Roman Emperor Leopold I. Giovanni Andrea's documents of the cession of the order, dated to 11 January 1698, to Farnese also specify that Farnese was granted "every right" pertaining to Giovanni Andrea to the "cities, jurisdictions, feudatories and lordships in parts of Dalmatia, Macedonia and Albania, occupied by the Turkish sultan". Farnese's assumption of these claims led to his later energetic participation in crusading plans drawn up by Prince Eugene of Savoy, Farnese hoping to become king of Albania, or perhaps even Byzantine emperor, in the case of a successful crusade against the Ottomans. Though some of the high-ranking members of the Constantinian Order initially opposed Farnese's accession, the confirmations by the Pope and the Holy Roman Emperor eased the transition of power.

=== Later life and death ===
Giovanni Andrea lived out his last years in "considerable comfort" in Piacenza, one of Farnese's fiefs, with the title of castellan. He died on 8 April 1703 and was buried in the church of San Marco in the city's castle. Giovanni Andrea's death extinguished the male line of his family. Giovanni Andrea's widow, Virginia Giovanna Mandricardi, died on 30 November 1724. The last living member of the Angelo Flavio Comneno family, Giovanni Andrea's niece Laura, died in 1756, rendering the family entirely extinct. Laura died as a nun in the convent of the Holy Spirit in Piacenza under the name "Maria Costanzo della Croce". Through surviving documents it is apparent that Laura had actually wished to marry and had not wanted to become a nun, but had been forced to by Francesco Farnese, who did not want to risk her having children; a potential future generation of rivals to his claim.

== See also ==
- Succession to the Byzantine Empire
