= List of grand masters of the Constantinian Order of Saint George =

Cross of the Constantinian Order of Saint George

This is a list of grand masters of the Constantinian Order of Saint George, a dynastic order of knighthood of the Catholic Church. Although it was founded by the Albanian Engjëlli family who claimed descent from the Byzantine Angelos dynasty in the 16th century, the order has throughout its existence maintained that it has its origin in Ancient Roman times, supposedly founded by Constantine the Great in the 4th century. Such an origin is otherwise regarded as being impossible, as there are no Roman or Byzantine records of such an institution ever existing and chivalric orders being completely unknown in the Byzantine world.

The founders of the order, the Engjëlli family, provided forged genealogies tracing their descent back to the 4th century, with grand masters covering the period from the Constantinian dynasty to the 16th century. These grand masters, maintained in modern official lists of grand masters, are mostly entirely invented, though some were real historical figures albeit with no connection to the chivalric order. In 1698, the position of grand master passed to the House of Farnese, and in 1731 it passed to the House of Bourbon-Two Sicilies, once rulers of the Kingdom of the Two Sicilies, to which the office still belongs. The line of grand masters within the House of Bourbon is divided today, with three separate claimants to the position. The Parmese branch of the Constantinian order split from the legitimate order in 1816 and is still maintained by the House of Bourbon-Parma. The legitimate order has itself been the subject of a succession dispute since 1960, which has in effect produced separate Spanish and Neapolitan orders, though neither recognizes the other as legitimate.

In addition to these succession disputes, claims to be the legitimate grand master of the Constantinian Order have also been forwarded by many impostors and pretenders to Byzantine titles and descent, on account of the order's invented Byzantine origins and its form of hereditary succession. As such, forgers who have claimed to represent "rightful" Byzantine emperors or dynasts have also often claimed the position of grand master. Several such "grand masters" remain active today.

== Legendary grand masters (313–1570) ==
The founding family of the Constantinian Order, the Angeli, made great genealogies that traced their descent back to the 4th century, as supposed descendants of Constantine the Great, with grand masters covering this period up until the 16th century. These grand masters are maintained in modern official lists of grand masters, but they are almost entirely invented figures. A handful of individuals are genuine historical figures, but they have no connection to the later chivalric order.

1. Constantine the Great, Roman emperor 306–337, allegedly founded the order in 313
2. Constantine II Flavius, Roman emperor 337–340
3. Constans I Flavius, Roman emperor 337–350
4. Constantius II Flavius, Roman emperor 337–361
5. Constans Gallus Angelos Flavius, "Prince of Macedonia", grand master 361–362
6. Michael I Gallus Angelos Flavius, "Prince of Macedonia", grand master 362–428
7. Alexios I Angelos Flavius Comnenos, "Prince of Macedonia", grand master 428–458
8. Alexios II Angelos Flavius Comnenos, "Prince of Cilicia and Macedonia", grand master 458–514
9. Michael II Angelos Flavius Comnenos, "Prince of Cilicia and Macedonia", grand master 514–548
10. Alexios Michael Angelos Flavius Comnenos, "Prince of Cilicia and Macedonia", grand master 548–586
11. Angelo Michael III Angelos Flavius Comnenos, "Prince of Cilicia and Macedonia", grand master 586–617
12. Philipp Basilius Pippin Angelos Flavius Comnenos, "Duke of Drivasto and Durazzo, Despot of the Pelopponesus", grand master 617–625
13. Isaac I Angelos Flavius Comnenos, "Prince of Cilicia and Macedonia", grand master 625–667
14. Alexios III Angelos Flavius Comnenos, "Prince of Cilicia and Macedonia", grand master 667–719
15. Constantine III Angelos Flavius Comnenos, "Prince of Cilicia and Macedonia", grand master 719–781
16. Michael IV Angelos Flavius Comnenos, "Prince of Cilicia and Macedonia", grand master 781–820
17. Constantine IV Angelos Flavius Comnenos, "Prince of Cilicia and Macedonia", grand master 820–905
18. Alexios IV Angelos Flavius Comnenos, "Prince of Cilicia and Macedonia", grand master 905–953
19. Michael V Angelos Flavius Comnenos, "Prince of Cilicia and Macedonia", grand master 953–984
20. Emanuel Michael Angelos Flavius Comnenos, "Prince of Cilicia and Macedonia", grand master 984–1021
21. Isaac II Angelos Flavius Comnenos, Byzantine emperor, grand master 1021–1061
22. Alexios V Angelos Flavius Comnenos, Byzantine emperor, grand master 1061–1118
23. John Angelos Flavius Comnenos, Byzantine emperor, grand master 1118–1143
24. Isaac III Angelos Flavius Comnenos, grand master 1143–1152
25. Andronikos Doukas Angelos Flavius Comnenos, grand master 1152–1186
26. Isaac IV Angelos Flavius Comnenos, Byzantine emperor, grand master 1186–1204
27. Alexios VI Angelos Flavius Comnenos, Byzantine emperor, grand master 1195–1204
28. Alexios Andreas Angelos Flavius Comnenos, "Count and Duke of Drivasto", grand master 1204–1260
29. Michael VI Angelos Flavius Comnenos, "Count and Duke of Drivasto/Despot of Epirus", grand master 1260–1318
30. Andreas I Nicephorus Andreas Angelos Flavius Comnenos, "Despot of Epirus", grand master 1318–1366
31. Michael VII Andreas Angelos Flavius Comnenos, "Despot of Epirus", grand master 1366–1410
32. Paul I Angelos Flavius Comnenos, "Duke of Drivasto and Durazzo", grand master 1410–1453
33. Andreas II Angelos Flavius Comnenos, "Duke and Count of Drivasto and Durazzo", grand master 1453–1457/1470
34. Paul II Angelos Flavius Comnenos, "Duke and Count of Drivasto and Durazzo", grand master 1447–1468/1469
35. Pietro Angelo Flavio Comneno, "Duke and Count of Drivasto and Durazzo", grand master 1469–1511/1512
36. Giovanni Demetrio Angelo Flavio Comneno, "Prince of Cilicia", grand master 1511/1512–1570

== Historical grand masters (1545–present) ==
=== House of Angeli (1545–1623) ===
No.	Portrait	Name	Tenure	Succession and Notes	Ref
37		Andrea Angeli Prince of Macedonia; Duke and Count of Drivasto and Durazzo	c. 1545–1580 (c. 35 years)	First historically verified grand master, presumably the founder of the order. Recognized as grand master, among other titles, in 1545 by Pope Paul III.	
38		Girolamo I Angeli Prince of Thessaly	c. 1570–1591 (21 years; with Andrea and then Pietro)	Brother of Andrea Angeli, joint or rival grand master. Recognized in modern lists.	
39		Pietro Angeli Prince of Macedonia; Duke and Count of Drivasto and Durazzo	1580–1592 (12 years)	Nephew and designated successor of Andrea Angeli	
40		Giovanni Andrea I Angeli Prince of Macedonia; Duke and Count of Drivasto and Durazzo	1592 – 14 August 1623 (31 years) (first tenure)	Son and designated successor of Pietro Angeli	

=== House of Caracciolo (1623–1627) ===
No.	Portrait	Name	Tenure	Succession and Notes	Ref
41		Marino Caracciolo Prince of Avellino	14 August 1623 – 1627 (4 years)	Prominent Neapolitan noble and distant family relation, purchased the position of grand master from Giovanni Andrea I Angeli, who had considerable debts at the time	

=== House of Angeli (1627–1698) ===
No.	Portrait	Name	Tenure	Succession and Notes	Ref
40		Giovanni Andrea I Angeli Prince of Macedonia; Duke and Count of Drivasto and Durazzo	1627 – December 1634 (7 years) (second tenure)	Marino Caracciolo's succession was not recognized by other members of the Angeli family, and faced with a lack of widespread recognition and legal challenges, he gave back the position to Giovanni Andrea I Angeli	
–		Majolino Bisaccioni Count of Megaridi	1632–1656 (24 years)	Previously grand chancellor, appointed as vice-grand master (grand master vicar) by Giovanni Andrea I Angeli in 1632, retaining this position after Giovanni Andrea I Angeli's death two years later, despite the two having fallen out. Recognized Angelo Maria Angeli's succession but did not relinquish his power until 1656.	
42		Angelo Maria Angeli Prince of Macedonia and Thessaly; Duke and Count of Drivasto and Durazzo	December 1634 – 1678 (44 years)	Second cousin and designated successor of Giovanni Andrea I Angeli. Did not gain de facto control over the order until Majolino Bisaccioni relinquished his position in 1656.	
43		Marco Angeli Prince of Macedonia and Thessaly; Duke and Count of Drivasto and Durazzo	1678–1679 (1 year)	Brother of Angelo Maria Angeli. Counted in official lists, but the historicity of his tenure is uncertain as he may have died before his brother.	
44		Girolamo II Angeli Prince of Macedonia; Duke and Count of Drivasto and Durazzo	1679–1687 (8 years)	Cousin and designated successor of Angelo Maria Angeli (or Marco Angeli)	
45		Giovanni Andrea II Angeli Prince of Macedonia; Duke and Count of Drivasto and Durazzo	1687 – 11 January 1698 (11 years)	Brother of Girolamo II Angeli. Last male member of his family.	

=== House of Farnese (1698–1731) ===
No.	Portrait	Name	Tenure	Succession and Notes	Ref
46		Francesco Farnese Duke of Parma and Piacenza	11 January 1698 – 26 February 1727 (29 years, 1 month and 15 days)	Purchased the position of grand master from Giovanni Andrea II Angeli. Documents of the sale specify that the order's hereditary succession from then on followed the descendants of Francesco Farnese. Further justified his claim to the order through matrilineal (female-line) descent from Isaac II Angelos. Rights confirmed by Pope Innocent XII and Holy Roman Emperor Leopold I.	
47		Antonio Farnese Duke of Parma and Piacenza	26 February 1727 – 20 January 1731 (3 years, 10 months and 25 days)	Brother of Francesco Farnese. Last male member of his family.	

=== House of Bourbon-Two Sicilies (1732–present) ===
No.	Portrait	Name	Tenure	Arms	Succession and Notes	Ref
48		Charles III of Spain King of Spain; King of Naples and Sicily; Duke of Parma and Piacenza	6 April 1732 – 16 October 1759 (27 years, 6 months and 10 days)		Son of Elisabeth Farnese, niece of Francesco Farnese and Antonio Farnese. Legitimate senior heir of Antonio Farnese. Formally invested as grand master by a group of Constantinian knights on 6 April 1732. Confirmed as grand master by Pope Clement XII on 12 May 1739.	
49		Ferdinand I of the Two Sicilies King of the Two Sicilies	16 October 1759 – 4 January 1825 (65 years, 2 months and 19 days)		Charles III became king of Spain in 1759, and due to agreements prohibiting the unification of the Spanish and Sicilian crowns, designated his third son Ferdinand as heir to his Italian possessions and as the new Constantinian grand master as "First Born Legitimate Farnese heir". Ferdinand's succession as grand master was confirmed by Pope Clement XIII on 18 December 1763.	
50		Francis I of the Two Sicilies King of the Two Sicilies	4 January 1825 – 8 November 1830 (5 years, 10 months and 4 days)		Son of Ferdinand I	
51		Ferdinand II of the Two Sicilies King of the Two Sicilies	8 November 1830 – 22 May 1859 (28 years, 6 months and 14 days)		Son of Francis I	
52		Francis II of the Two Sicilies King of the Two Sicilies	22 May 1859 – 27 December 1894 (35 years, 7 months and 5 days)		Son of Ferdinand II. Francis II was the last king of the Two Sicilies, being deposed in 1861 during the unification of Italy. Francis II retained his position as grand master after his deposition.	
53		Prince Alfonso Count of Caserta	27 December 1894 – 26 May 1934 (39 years, 4 months and 29 days)		Brother of Francis II and heir to his claims and prerogatives	
54		Prince Ferdinand Pius Duke of Castro; Duke of Calabria	26 May 1934 – 7 January 1960 (25 years, 7 months and 12 days)		Son of Alfonso	

==== Disputed succession (1960–present) ====
The leadership of the Constantinian Order has been disputed since the death of Ferdinand Pius in 1960. The immediate male primogeniture heir of Ferdinand Pius was Infante Alfonso, the son of Ferdinand’s eldest younger brother Carlos. Carlos married María de las Mercedes, Princess of Asturias, the heir presumptive to the throne of Spain, in 1901. Before the marriage, the Spanish minister of Justice stated explicitly in the Cortes (Parliament) that there was no need for Prince Carlos to renounce his "eventual succession to the crown" of the Two Sicilies, and that no such renunciation would be valid, although a renunciation of former nationality was required to become a Spanish citizen. Since the treaty of Vienna of 1737 and the treaty of Naples of 1759, followed by the Pragmatic Decree of 1759, it was required that the crowns of Spain and Two Sicilies should not be united in the same person and in such circumstances the Italian sovereignties should be abdicated to the next prince in line. Nonetheless, Prince Carlos’s father, the Count of Caserta, drew up a precaution the Act of Cannes to ensure that should the Princess of Asturias become queen and therefore her husband king consort, and should Prince Ferdinand Pius die without surviving male issue, the eventual succession to the crown would pass to the next prince in line. The pragmatic decree of Charles III of Spain of 1759 and the Two Sicilies royal constitution in force in 1860 did not require a renunciation in any other circumstances. Nevertheless, Ferdinand Pius' and Carlos' younger brother, Ranieri, began to regard himself as Ferdinand's heir. The grand mastership of the Constantinian Order is a separate succession governed by its own statutes confirmed by the Papal bull Militantis Ecclesiae of 1718 and was defined on 8 March 1796 by Ferdinand IV and III (from 1815 Ferdinand I of the Two Sicilies) as a separate and distinct dignity from the Two Sicilies crown. It was this separate nature that enabled it to survive the abolition of the kingdom of the Two Sicilies and obtain the public support of Pope Pius X and Pope Benedict XV in the early 20th century. There was no mention of the Constantinian Order or its grand mastership in the Act of Cannes and in 1929 the Count of Caserta asked Prince Carlos to assume the grand mastership to ensure its Catholic nature, since the Lateran Treaty had changed the close relationship hitherto enjoyed by the heads of the Two Sicilies royal house with the Vatican. Prince Carlos, however, declined as at that time he was a serving Captain-General in the Spanish army with multiple public responsibilities in Spain.

In Naples, in 1960, where the then vice-grand chancellor of the Order, Achille Di Lorenzo, resided, there was some opposition towards the idea of Alfonso succeeding Fredinand as it was feared that he would introduce Spanish elements into what was otherwise viewed as a distinctly Neapolitan institution. Not only was Ranieri supported by many of the Constantinian Order's members, but Ferdinand Pius also made it clear that he wished Ranieri, and not Alfonso, to succeed him. This was by no means commonly supported as correspondence on the subject in the Italian Rivista Araldica demonstrates. At the same time as Ranieri was proclaimed grand master in Naples after Pius' death, Alfonso was proclaimed grand master in Madrid; Alfonso had at no point doubted his own rights and had not even been informed by his father that they had been "renounced" given that Carlos himself considered his supposed renunciation irrelevant.

The claim of Ranieri and his descendants was supported by some of those in the senior ranks of the Constantinian Order, notably several only recently admitted to the Order, the claim of Alfonso was immediately supported by the Spanish Royal House headed by Infante Juan, Count of Barcelona, and included the exiled royals Robert of Parma (also grand master of his branch of the order) and Duarte Nuno de Bragança (head of the former royal house of Portugal), Infante Jaime, Duke of Segovia and Anjou, and Pedro-Gastao of Orleans-Braganza. Those senior members who supported the succession of Infante Don Alfonso included Francesco Paternò Castello, duke of Carcaci, Cardinals Benedetto Aloisi Masella, Nicola Canali, and Giuseppe Pizzardo, Count Thierry de Limburg-Stirum, Marquess Eduardo Persichetti Ugolini (whose wife was the great-niece of Pope Pius XI), and Oderisio di Sandro, Prince of Fondi. Noteworthy royal supporters of Ranieri's claim included Umberto II (the former king of Italy), Henri of Orléans (claimant to the throne of France), Archduke Gottfried of Austria (titular Grand Duke of Tuscany), Albrecht (titular Duke of Bavaria), Philipp Albrecht (titular Duke of Württemberg), Prince Amadeo (titular Duke of Aosta), Filiberto (titular Duke of Genoa) and Prince Michael of Greece and Denmark, among others. From 1981 the Italian government began to authorize the use of the decorations awarded by Prince Ferdinando (Ranieri’s son) while declining to authorise those who received the Order from Alfonso or his heirs to wear the Order; this changed in 2004, following several scandals, including the exposure of numerous forged Vatican documents produced by senior officials in the Ranieri Order, and awards granted by both lines of grand masters are now authorised in Italy. Spain has gone further and a statement of the Spanish ministry of foreign affairs dated 4 November 2014 confirmed that the Constantinian Order awarded by Infante don Carlos (and now by Prince Don Pedro) was, like the Orders of Malta and the Holy Sepulchre, recognised as being “under the protection of the Crown of Spain or strictly tied to it historically” (the awards to Spaniards by the junior Castro line are not authorized in Spain. The two sides of the family negotiated a formal agreement mutual recognising the titles used by each side in a solemn declaration signed in Naples in 2014, but less than two years later Prince Carlo (heir to Ranieri's claim) declared his older daughter to be heiress, stated he would no longer follow the terms of the agreement and purported to confer the titles that he had recognised as belonging to the senior line on his daughters.

Monaco branch (Ranieri's descendants)

No.	Portrait	Name	Tenure	Arms	Succession and Notes	Ref
55		Prince Ranieri Duke of Castro	7 January 1960 – 13 January 1973 (13 years and 6 days)		Brother and intended heir of Ferdinand Pius	
56		Prince Ferdinand Duke of Castro	13 January 1973 – 20 March 2008 (35 years, 2 months and 7 days)		Son of Ranieri	
57		Prince Carlo Duke of Castro	20 March 2008 – present (18 years, 6 months and 27 days)		Son of Ferdinand	

Spanish branch (Alfonso's descendants)

No.	Portrait	Name	Tenure	Arms	Succession and Notes	Ref
55		Infante Alfonso Duke of Calabria; Count of Caserta	7 January 1960 – 3 February 1964 (4 years and 27 days)		Nephew of Ferdinand Pius	
56		Infante Carlos Duke of Calabria	3 February 1964 – 5 October 2015 (51 years, 8 months and 2 days)		Son of Alfonso	
57		Prince Pedro Duke of Calabria	5 October 2015 – present (11 years and 12 days)		Son of Carlos	

== Claimants and pretenders ==
=== Parmese Constantinian order (1816–present) ===
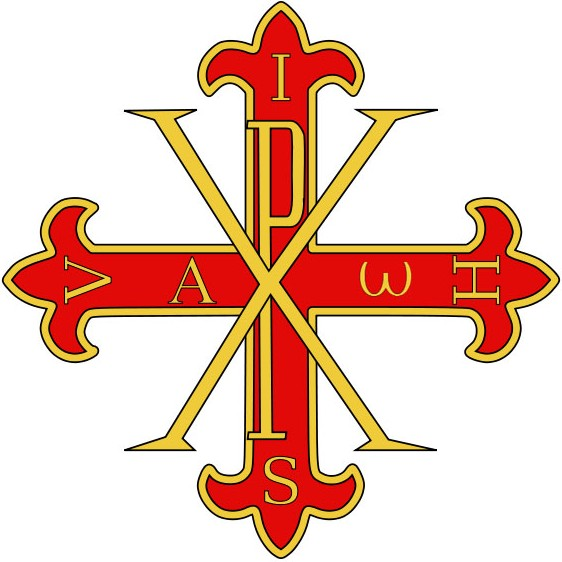
The crosses of the main Two Sicilies order (left) and the Parmese version of the order (right) can be distinguished by the uppercase omega (Ω) of the Two Sicilies cross and the lowercase omega (ω) of the Parmese cross

After the defeat of Napoleon, the Congress of Vienna accorded his former wife, Marie Louise of the House of Habsburg-Lorraine, the duchies of Parma, Piacenza and Guastalla, and shortly thereafter also Lucca (though she only held Lucca briefly), as the owner of those territories, the Kingdom of Etruria, had been a Napoleonic ally. Before she even reached her new territories, Maria Louise's advisor, companion and lover Adam Albert von Neipperg recognized that she would require the support of the local nobility in Parma in order to rule efficiently, and thus advised Marie Louise to found her own Constantinian Order, envisioned as a re-establishment of the original institution.

Claiming that the grand mastership of the order was tied to the duchies of Parma and Piacenza and descent from the Farnese family, Marie Louise proclaimed herself grand master of the Constantinian Order on 26 February 1816. She was descended from the Farnese family through her grandfather, Ferdinand I of the Two Sicilies, who was still alive and still legitimately claimed the position of grand master himself. Although her claim to the position was immediately met with protest from Ferdinand, Maria Louise had the powerful support of her father, Emperor Francis I of Austria. Though Ferdinand protested to Pope Pius VII, there was little Pius could do other than refusing to recognize Maria Louise, especially in the face of Francis' support of her. Trying to reach a position of agreement, the official position of the court of the Two Sicilies was that Ferdinand's right to the order could not be diminished as it was based on primogeniture, but that Maria Louise was also in her right to found an order in imitation of the Constantinian Order given that she governed Parma; however due to the changes introduced by her, such as introductions of new classes, the order could not be considered a continuation of the ancient order. There was never any formal accord between Parma and Naples, but the two orders continued to maintain a status quo by refusing requests for awards by the other's subjects, and by the Parma order adding the adjectives "Imperial" and "Angelic" to the order's full name.

==== House of Habsburg-Lorraine (1816–1847) ====
No.	Portrait	Name	Tenure	Arms	Succession and Notes	Ref
(50)		Marie Louise Duchess of Parma, Piacenza and Guastalla	26 February 1816 – 17 December 1847 (31 years, 9 months and 21 days)		Granddaughter of Ferdinand I of the Two Sicilies. Claimed the position (against Ferdinand I) by virtue of being a descendant of the Farnese family in possession of Parma.	

==== House of Bourbon-Parma (1848–present) ====
No.	Portrait	Name	Tenure	Arms	Succession and Notes	Ref
(51)		Charles II Duke of Parma and Piacenza	17 January 1848 – 17 May 1849 (1 year and 4 months)		Succeeded Marie Louise as Duke of Parma per the Congress of Vienna. Assumed the position of grand master on 17 January 1848.	
(52)		Charles III Duke of Parma and Piacenza	8 October 1849 – 27 March 1854 (4 years, 5 months and 19 days)		Son of Charles II, who abdicated in his favor in 1849. Formally took the position of grand master on 8 October 1849, after a period of exile.	
(53)		Robert I Duke of Parma and Piacenza	27 March 1854 – 16 November 1907 (53 years, 7 months and 20 days)		Son of Charles III. Deposed as Duke after only four years, ending the Duchy of Parma. Robert thereafter lived in exile in Rome and then Vienna, continuing to claim the position of grand master.	
(54)		Henry Duke of Parma and Piacenza	16 November 1907 – 16 November 1939 (32 years)		Son of Robert I	
(55)		Joseph Duke of Parma and Piacenza	16 November 1939 – 7 January 1950 (10 years, 1 month and 22 days)		Son of Robert I	
(56)		Elias Duke of Parma and Piacenza	7 January 1950 – 27 June 1959 (9 years, 5 months and 20 days)		Son of Robert I	
(57)		Robert Hugo Duke of Parma and Piacenza	27 June 1959 – 15 November 1974 (15 years, 4 months and 19 days)		Son of Elias	
(58)		Prince Xavier Duke of Parma and Piacenza	15 November 1974 – 7 May 1977 (2 years, 5 months and 22 days)		Son of Robert I	
(59)		Carlos Hugo Duke of Parma and Piacenza	7 May 1977 – 18 August 2010 (33 years, 3 months and 11 days)		Son of Xavier	
(60)		Prince Carlos Duke of Parma and Piacenza	18 August 2010 – present (16 years, 1 month and 29 days)		Son of Carlos Hugo	

=== Other claimants ===
- Andrea Angeli (claimant 1634–1644), the youngest son of grand master Girolamo I Angeli. Disputed the succession of Angelo Maria Angeli in 1634 on account of Angelo Maria's father Michele Angeli having been born illegitimate.
- Girolamo II Angeli (claimant 1644–1678/1679), the eldest son of Andrea. Girolamo II continued his father's lack of recognition of Angelo Maria as grand master. Upon the death of Angelo Maria in 1678 (or Marco in 1679), Girolamo II succeeded as the legitimate grand master of the order.
- Ferdinand, Duke of Parma (claimant 1778–1802), a member of the House of Bourbon, Ferdinand claimed the position of grand master in opposition to Ferdinand I of the Two Sicilies on the erroneous argument that the office was tied to the Duchy of Parma (which Ferdinand held), rather than hereditary succession, similar to Marie Louis's later claim.

=== Forgers ===
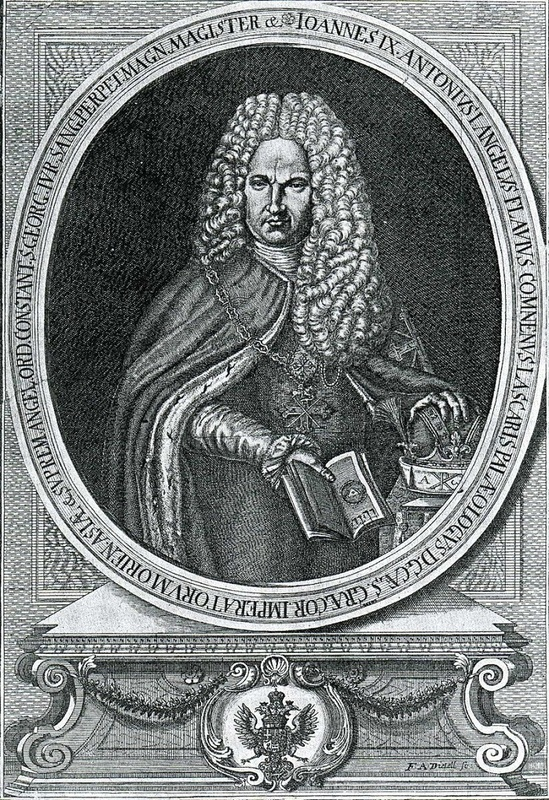
Gian Antonio Lazier, an 18th-century forger who claimed the grand mastership, viewing the sale to Farnese as being of questionable legality

Because the position of grand master within the Constantinian Order is hereditary, numerous forgers and self-styled princes have either claimed relations to the Angeli family, or claimed entirely alternate lines of imperial descent (so as to produce a superior claim to the position). For the most part, such claimants can easily be dismissed as forgers and opportunists, typically without genuine links to Greek or Albanian families. Many later pretenders have purported to be either part of the order, or its legitimate grand master.

- John George Heracleus Basilicos (claimant c. 1566–1593), a claimant to Byzantine heritage just like the Angeli family, John George and Andrea Angeli (grand master c. 1545–1580) recognized each other as Byzantine descendants and relatives out of mutual benefit. In the 1560s, John George proclaimed himself grand master, a claim he maintained until he was imprisoned in 1593 after the papacy favored the claims of grand master Giovanni Andrea I Angeli over his.
- Gian Antonio Lazier (claimant c. 1720–1738), forged relations with the Angeli family and the Palaiologos dynasty of Byzantine emperors and thus challenged Francesco Farnese's assumption of the position of grand master, arguing that his line of Byzantine descent was superior to that of Farnese and that the sale of the position was of questionable legality. Seen by some contemporaries as having an equally valid claim to the position as Farnese, Lazier was officially supported by Charles VI, Holy Roman Emperor, until around the time his forgeries were exposed by Farnese in 1725.
- Radu Cantacuzino (claimant c. 1735–1761), descendant of the Byzantine Kantakouzenos family and son of Ștefan Cantacuzino, Prince of Wallachia (r. 1714–1716). Inventing a line of descent directly from Emperor John VI Kantakouzenos, Cantacuzino claimed the grand mastership as a rival to both Francesco Farnese and Gian Antonio Lazier, perhaps with recognition from Charles VI, Holy Roman Emperor.
- Ioannis Rhodocanakis (claimant c. 1860–1895), father of Demetrius Rhodocanakis, proclaimed as the legitimate grand master in the writings of his son.
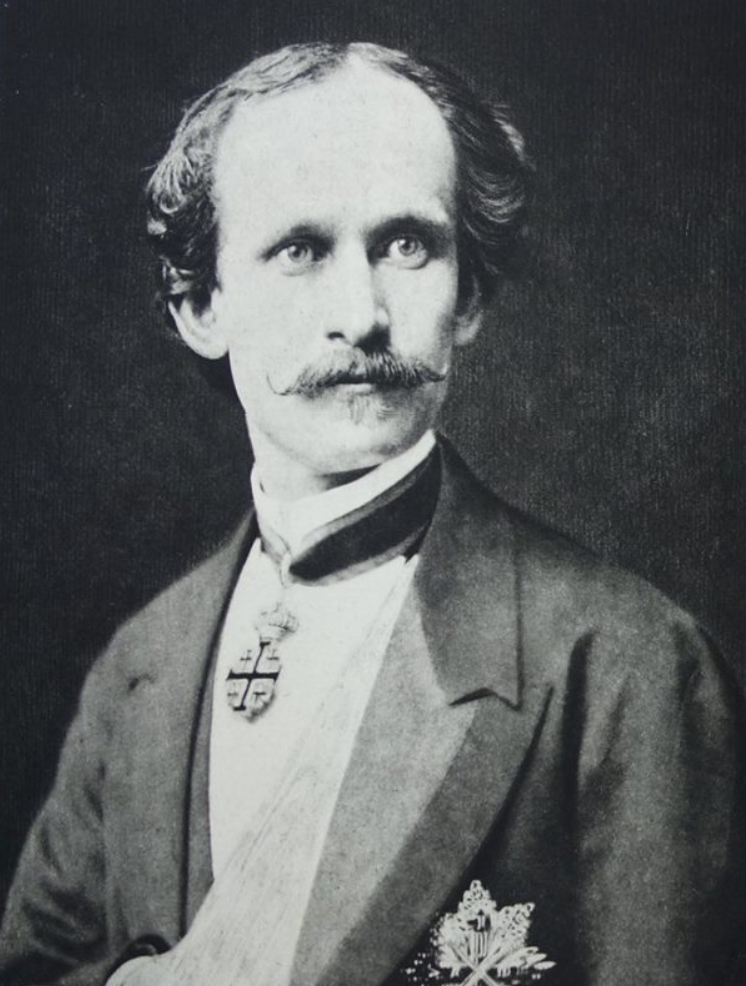
- Demetrius Rhodocanakis, who claimed to be the legitimate grand master in the late 19th and early 20th century through forged connections to the Palaiologos dynasty
  Demetrius Rhodocanakis (claimant 1895–1902), forged descent from the Palaiologos dynasty of Byzantine emperors, claiming female-line descent from Theodore Paleologus (c. 1560–1636). Claimed the position of grand master and the title of emperor after his father's death in 1895. In 1871, Rhodocanakis' claims were recognized by the papacy after an audience with Pope Pius IX. His claims had been thoroughly exposed and debunked by the early 20th century.
- Eugenio Lascorz (claimant c. 1906–1962), forged descent from the Laskaris dynasty of Byzantine emperors, claiming the position of titular emperor as well as claiming to be the rightful grand master of the Constantinian Order, as well as of a self-styled order, the "Order of Saint Eugene of Trebizond".
- Paul Crivez (claimant 1945–1984), claimed to be the rightful senior heir of the Palaiologos dynasty through adoption by Alexandrine Paléologue (born Boutcoulesco), the widow of a man named Grégoire Paléologue. Crivez forged a genealogy that made Grégoire out to be a descendant of Manuel Palaiologos.
- Marziano Lavarello (claimant c. 1948–1992), forged descent from the Laskaris and Palaiologos dynasties, claiming to be the rightful emperor as well as the rightful grand master of the Constantinian Order. Lavarello's claims were recognized by a court in Rome in 1948.
- Peter Mills (claimant 1960s–1988), forged descent from the Palaiologos dynasty, through Manuel Palaiologos, claiming to be the rightful emperor as well as the rightful grand master of the Constantinian Order.
- Enrico de Vigo Paleologo (claimant 1961–2010), forged connections to the Laskaris and Palaiologos dynasty, and even as far back as Emperor Nero (r. 54–68). Claimed to be the rightful emperor and grand master of both the Constantinian Order and his own "Order of the Cross of Constantinople".
- Teodoro Láscaris (claimant 1962–2006), son and heir of Eugenio Lascorz.
- Pietro Paleologo Mastrogiovanni (claimant 1966–2017), forged descent from Thomas Palaiologos, claimed to be the rightful emperor and grand master.
- Patricia Palaeologina (claimant 1988–present), widow of Peter Mills and continuator of his claims, his children by his first wife having renounced his pretensions as a "utter sham".
- Arcadia Luigi Maria Picco (claimant 1992–present), questionably claims to have been willed the claims and titles of Marziano Lavarello, presenting himself as Lavarello's successor as titular emperor and grand master of the Constantinian Order.
- Eugenio Láscaris (claimant 2006–present), son and heir of Teodoro Láscaris.
- Françoise Paleologo (claimant 2010–present), widow and designated heir to the position of grand master of Enrico Constantino de Vigo Aleramico Lascaris Paleologo.
- Giovanni Angelo Paleologo Mastrogiovanni (claimant 2017–present), son and heir of Pietro Paleologo Mastriogiovanni.

== See also ==
- Succession to the Byzantine Empire
