= Giovanni Andrea I Angeli =

- Prince of Macedonia; Duke and Count of Drivasto and Durazzo
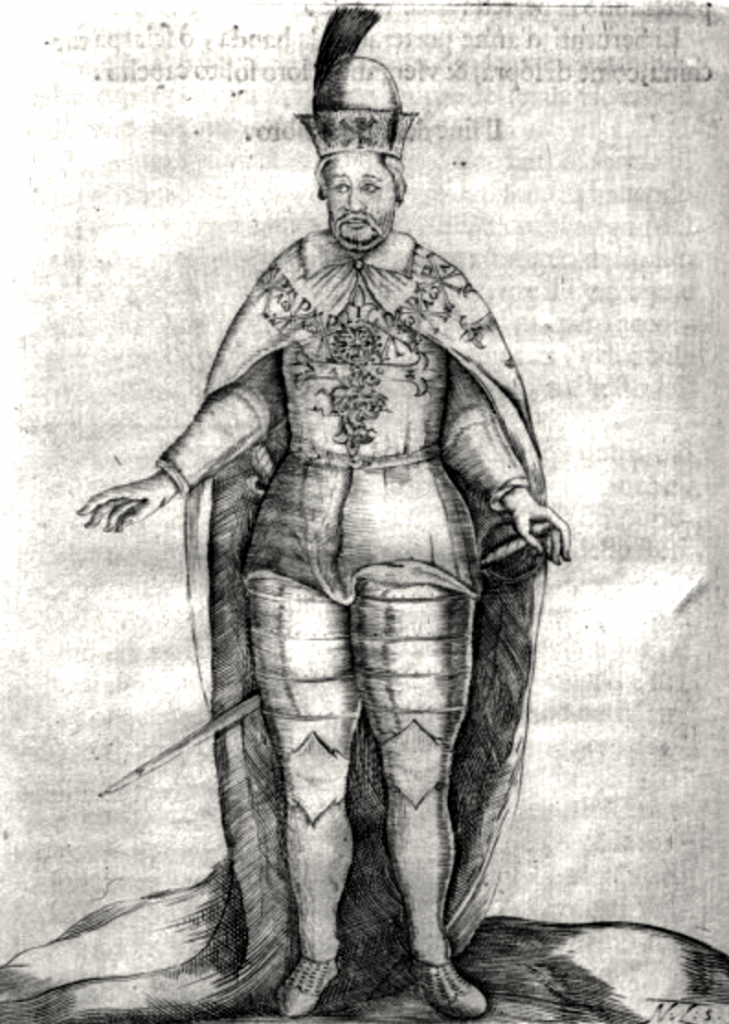
- 17th-century depiction of Giovanni Andrea I Angeli

Grand Master of the Constantinian Order of Saint George
- 1st tenure: 1592–1623
- Predecessor: Pietro Angeli
- Successor: Marino Caracciolo
- 2nd tenure: 1627–1634
- Predecessor: Marino Caracciolo
- Successor: Angelo Maria Angeli
- Born: 20 March 1569
- Died: December 1634 (aged 65); Venice
- House: Angelo Flavio Comneno
- Father: Pietro Angeli
- Mother: Lucrezia Beolchi

Giovanni Andrea I Angelo Flavio Comneno (Latin: Joannes Andreas Angelus Flavius Comnenus; 20 March 1569 – December 1634) was the Grand Master of the Constantinian Order of Saint George from 1592 to 1623 and from 1627 to 1634. In addition to the position of grand master, Giovanni Andrea also claimed the titles "Prince of Macedonia" and "Duke and Count of Drivasto and Durazzo". Giovanni Andrea oversaw a period of internationalization of the Constantinian Order, and despite repeated challenges to his position managed to maintain the widespread recognition of his order and family.

== Biography ==
Giovanni Andrea was born on 20 March 1569 as the eldest son of Pietro Angeli. Giovanni Andrea had a younger brother, Giacomo Antonio, who was still alive in 1610, but died before Giovanni Andrea. Giovanni Andrea's family, the Angelo Flavio Comneno, claimed descent from the Angelos dynasty of Byzantine emperors. In the mid-15th century, Pietro's uncles Andrea and Paolo were officially acknowledged as descendants of the Angelos emperors by Pope Paul III (r. 1534–1549) and founded the Sacred Military Constantinian Order of Saint George, a chivalric order with invented Byzantine connections. Upon Pietro's death in 1592, Giovanni Andrea succeeded him as grand master of the order.

=== Wavering papal support ===
Giovanni Andrea's tenure as grand master saw serious challenges to his family's order. Because of the hereditary succession of the position of grand master, and the increasing prestige of the order, the Angeli had to face several forgers and self-styled princes who claimed either relation with their family, or alternate lines of imperial descent themselves, so as to produce superior claims to the position. For the most part, such claimants were opportunists without actual links to Greek or Albanian families, and the Angeli were consistently successful in exposing fraudsters and maintaining their own rights. However, the frequent disputes and challenges over rulership of the order led to a decrease in papal support. A papal edict made on 13 February 1606 forbid the wearing of the order's cross, as well as using any titles, dignities or honors granted by Giovanni Andrea while in Rome, a serious crisis in terms of the order's relations with the papacy.

Wishing to restore the prestige of the order, Giovanni Andrea forbid anyone not authorized to wear the crosses of the order from doing so on 18 November 1620. In 1623, the question of whether the order was legitimate in the first place was before the Roman Rota, the highest appellate tribunal of the Catholic Church. Luckily for Giovanni Andrea, the two auditors of the case, Francesco de Ubaldi and Giacomo Cavalieri, determined that the order was genuine and that Giovanni Andrea was its legitimate grand master. On 10 February 1638, Pope Urban VIII officially recognized and confirmed the titles and privileges of Giovanni Andrea's family and order, restoring the previous papal support.

=== Internationalization and financial troubles ===
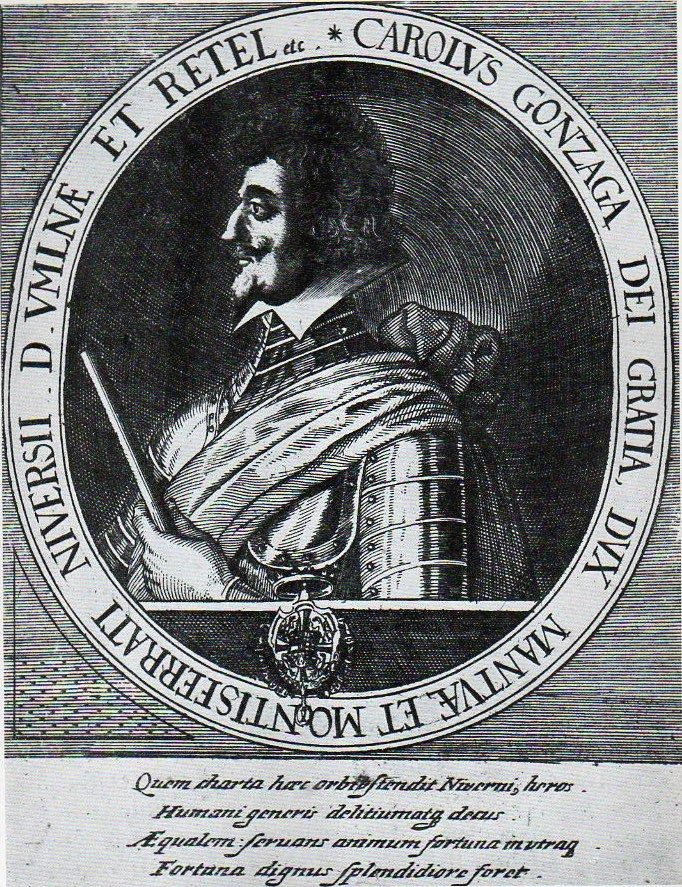
Charles II Gonzaga, whose unsuccessful attempts at starting a crusade in the early 17th century were supported by Giovanni Andrea

Giovanni Andrea presided over a period of internationalization of the Constantinian Order. In 1588, the statutes of the order were for the first time published in Spanish and in 1603, Giovanni Andrea dedicated a published book of his genealogy to Philip III of Spain. In 1613, the Constantinian Order was mentioned in a larger historical compendium of various chivalric orders published in Cologne. Taken together, this demonstrates a growing international interest in the Constantinian Order in Europe.

In the early 17th century, Charles II Gonzaga (who was descended from the Palaeologus-Montferrat family, a western cadet branch of the Byzantine Palaiologos dynasty) dreamt of a crusade against the Ottoman Empire. Already in 1611, Charles had made plans for an expedition to conquer Cyprus, and he was in touch with several prominent Orthodox Christian religious leaders in the eastern Mediterranean. In 1618, Charles founded the Militia Christiana ("Christian militia"), a quasi-chivalric order, and invited several prominent descendants of Balkan exiles, including Giovanni Andrea. Encouraged by Charles' efforts to revive the crusading sentiment in Europe, Giovanni Andrea took the opportunity to reassert the claimed origins of his family, in the hope that a successful crusade could result in the restoration of the Byzantine Empire under the "only surviving imperial dynasty", his family. Though he had widespread support, not everyone believed the claims of his family. Notably, Dudley Carleton, the English ambassador to Venice (where Giovanni Andrea lived) described Giovanni Andrea as "of poor appearance" and as "pretending to be the sole heir" of Constantine the Great. Elsewhere, Giovanni Andrea remained unquestioned, and he managed to receive recognition as well as a promise of support by Leopold V, Archduke of Austria.

Charles' crusading plans were massive in scale. Having achieved the support of the princes of Moldavia and Wallachia, as well as figures throughout Europe, it was planned that an army 160,000 strong was to attack the Ottoman Empire and capture several strategic fortresses and settlements, including Constantinople itself. A large number of the soldiers were planned to be provided by France, but France's relations with the Ottoman Empire, and the country's commercial interests in the eastern Mediterranean meant that French support was unlikely. In the end, Charles' "crusade" never got off the ground. Giovanni Andrea's limited participation in the failed scheme had been a financial gamle: it not only meant that no attempt was made to take the family's claimed lands, it also left him in debt. The financial troubles led to Giovanni Andrea going as far as to accepting payment for giving out noble titles, a much criticized behavior. Seeking a drastic solution to his problems, Giovanni Andrea on 14 August 1623 ceded the position of grand master to Marino Caracciolo, prince of Avellino, a prominent Neapolitan noble and a distant relative of the Angeli. Though Caracciolo enthusiastically accepted, and was proud to be grand master, his claim to the position was tenuous given that succession was normally based on primogeniture within the Angeli family. Giovanni Andrea's second cousin, Andrea Angeli, a son of the previous grand master Girolamo I, objected to the transfer. Faced with legal challenges, which could tarnish his tenure as grand master, Caracciolo abdicated the position in 1627, designating Giovanni Andrea as grand master once more.

In his second tenure as grand master, Giovanni Andrea was again faced by issues of wavering recognition. Two edicts of the papal chamber, one by Rev. Gregorio Naro in 1627 and the other by Rev. Marcantonio Franciotta in 1632, criticized the Constantinan Order and the claims of the Angeli family, forbidding Giovanni Andrea from bestowing titles or privileges. The governor of Milan also officially condemned Giovanni Andrea and his order. Giovanni Andra defended himself from these skeptics by pointing to his family's past recognition by the papacy and the church, especially the recent recognitions in 1623 and 1638, as well as pointing out that many troubles stemmed from people unrelated to the legitimate order having published falsified documents.

=== Death and succession ===
On 12 July 1632, Giovanni Andrea named Majolino Bisaccioni as the vice-grand master of the Constantinian Order. Bisaccioni was a prominent member of the order, and had proven a successful administrator during Giovanni Andrea's second tenure as grand master. Giovanni Andrea died in December 1634 and was succeeded as grand master by his designated heir, his second cousin Angelo Maria Angeli. Majolino Bisaccioni maintained his position as vice-grand master even after Giovanni Andrea's death, opposed to Giovanni Andrea's own wishes, believing that Angelo Maria's succession to the position should not diminish his own authority. Giovanni Andrea was buried in the church of San Giorgio in the small town of Chirignago.

== See also ==
- Succession to the Byzantine Empire
