= Angelo Flavio Comneno =

Angelo Flavio Comneno Angelus Flavius Comnenus Angeli, Angelori, Engjëlli, Engjëllorët
- Coat of arms of the Angeli as depicted in the 3rd edition of Rivista del Collegio Araldico, published in 1905 (p.430)
- Parent house: Angelos (claimed)
- Country: Albania; Italy
- Founded: c. 1480
- Founder: Andres Engjëlli (earliest known)
- Final head: Laura Angeli
- Titles: Grand Master of the Sacred Military Constantinian Order of Saint George; Prince of Macedonia (titular); Prince of Thessaly (titular); Duke and Count of Drivasto and Durazzo (titular)
- Traditions: Roman Catholicism
- Dissolution: 1756

The Angelo Flavio Comneno or Angeli (Note: The family name was often latinized as Angelus Flavius Comnenus. Sometimes shorter variants, such as Angeli or Angeli di Drivasto ("Angelos of Drisht") were used.) (Albanian: Engjëlli or Engjëllorët) were a Venetian noble family of Albanian descent who claimed descent from the Angelos dynasty of the Byzantine Empire. In the 16th century, the family founded the Sacred Military Constantinian Order of Saint George, a knightly order with Byzantine connections. From the 16th century onwards, each head of the family styled himself "the Prince of Macedonia, and Duke and Count of Drivasto and Durazzo", though other titles were also sometimes used.

It is possible that their claims to descent from the Angeloi were genuine, but their own genealogies, which professed descent from Emperor Isaac II Angelos (r. 1185–1195 and 1203–1204) are unlikely to be correct given that all known male-line descendants of Isaac II were long dead before the Angeli appeared in Italy. Perhaps they descended from less known children or cousins of the Angeloi emperors, or possibly through a female line. Their descent was accepted as true throughout Western Europe.

The last prince of the family was Giovanni Andrea II Angeli, who in 1698 transferred the Constantinian Order to Francesco Farnese, the Duke of Parma, whose descendants remain grand masters to this day. Giovanni Andrea II's death five years later, in 1703, was followed by the death of his niece, Laura Angeli, in 1756, which rendered the family extinct.

== Ancestry ==
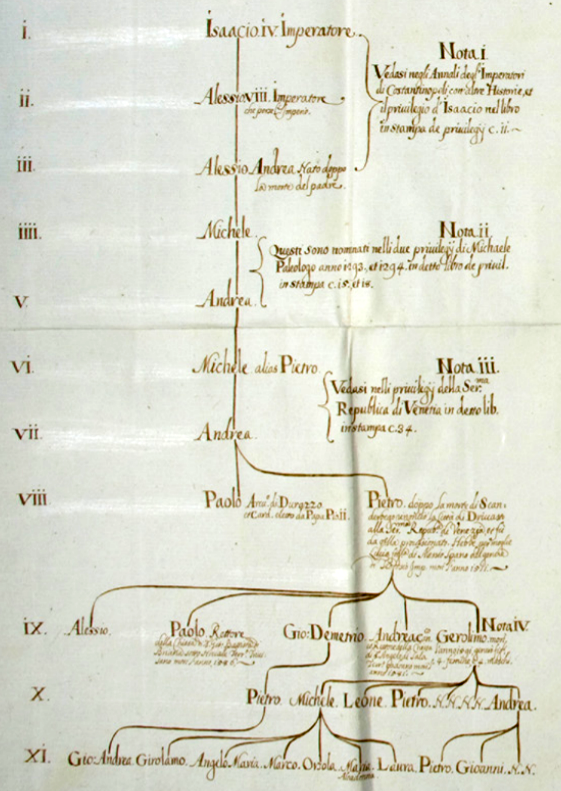
Claimed genealogy of the Angeli, showing them as direct male-line descendants of Isaac II Angelos (here designated Isaac IV)

The Angeli claimed to be direct male-line descendants of Emperor Isaac II Angelos (r. 1185–1195, 1203–1204), and thus a branch of the namesake Byzantine Greek dynasty. (Note: The Angeli held that they were descendants of Isaac II through his son Alexios IV Angelos, who they claimed had an otherwise unattested son called Alexios Andreas. Alexios Andreas would then have been the father of a man by the name of Michael, who was the father of a man called Andreas, who was the father of a man called Michael or Peter, who was the father of Andres Engjëlli.) They also claimed that Isaac II was a direct descendant from Constantine the Great (r. 306–337). Giovanni Andrea I Angeli (1569–1634) claimed Isaac II was his ancestor in the ninth degree. Although Isaac II had many descendants in the female line, being related to many noble and royal houses in Europe through his daughter Irene Angelina, and had sons, all documented direct male-line descendants were long dead before the Angeli arrived in Italy. The male line of the Angelos emperors is not recorded to have survived beyond the death of Emperor Alexios III Angelos in 1211. Later members of the Angelos family descended from John Doukas, uncle of Isaac II and Angelos III. John's descendants, who often preferred to use the name 'Komnenos Doukas' rather than 'Angelos', ruled Epirus and Thessaly until the 14th century. Among their last known recorded descendants were Michael Angelović (fl. 1451–73), a Serbian magnate, and Mahmud Pasha Angelović (1420–1474), who served as the grand vizier of the Ottoman Empire under Sultan Mehmed II, in 1456–1466 and 1472–1474.

It is possible that the later Angeli in Italy either directly or collaterally descended from less well known children or cousins of the Angelos emperors. That there might be some truth to the Angeli's claim to illustrious descent is strengthened by the willingness of other Balkan nobles, in part of actual royal lineages, to accept their descent. Descent through female lines, claimed by some of the members of the family, is also plausible. The claims of the Angeli of imperial descent were accepted in Western Europe without much dispute: there were already several known descendants of Byzantine nobility across the continent, legitimate or not, so the addition of another family was not surprising. The earliest certain ancestor of the Angeli was the Albanian noble Andres Engjëlli (Hellenized as "Andreas Angelos" and written as "Andrea Angelo" in Italian), attested in the 1480s.

Andres Engjëlli married Dorothea Arianiti of the prominent Arianiti family and the sister of Gjergj Arianiti. The eldest son of Andres Engjëlli, Pal Engjëlli (later called Paolo Angeli in Italian sources), was a counsellor and supporter of Skanderbeg, who led Albanian resistance against the Ottomans. Pal's younger brother Pjetër (later called Pietro in Italian sources) married Lucia Span, the daughter of Peter Spani, one of the most prominent Christian leaders in Albania. Once the Albanian resistance against the Ottoman Empire was defeated and the country was conquered, the Angeli escaped to Italy.

In 1545, the brothers Andrea and Paolo Angeli, sons of Pjetër, were officially acknowledged as descendants of the Angelos emperors by Pope Paul III (r. 1534–1549). The two brothers were also guaranteed the right to inherit territory in the former Byzantine Empire, should such territory be recovered from the Ottomans, and, as recognized heirs to the Byzantine imperial title, given the right to appoint princes and even kings themselves. The papacy was eager to support the Angeli, not only because Pope Paul III had genuinely believed their claims, but also because a family of Catholic descendants of Byzantine emperors provided hope that if the Ottomans were ever driven out of the Balkans, the Byzantine Empire could be restored under a Catholic dynasty, religiously obedient to the papacy.

== Foundation of the Constantinian Order ==
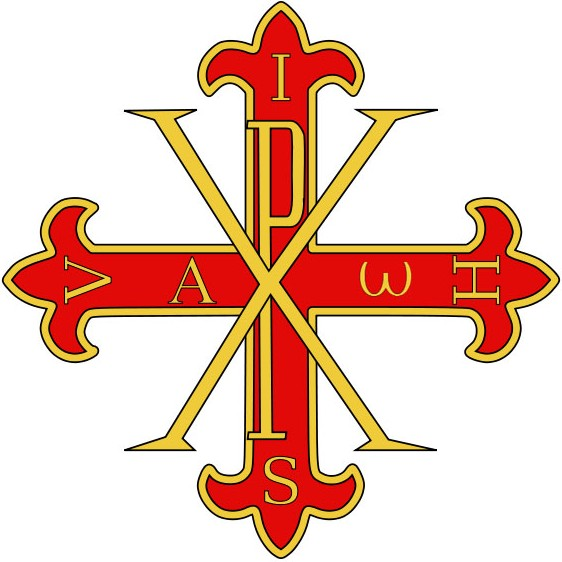
Cross of the Sacred Military Constantinian Order of Saint George

The Angeli family were the founders of the Sacred Military Constantinian Order of Saint George. When the Angeli began to claim to represent grand masters of this order is not entirely clear, though the claim is attested from Pope Paul III's acknowledgement of the descent of Andrea and Paolo in 1545 onwards. Though the order was of very recent origin, the Angeli claimed that it was the successor of Constantine the Great's 'Labarum guard' and that it was of antique origin, founded either by Constantine himself in the 4th century or his later successor Heraclius in the 7th century, depending on the account. These claims were soon widely accepted throughout Europe. Claims that the Constantinian Order represented an ancient imperial institution, which many Byzantine emperors had supposedly served as grand masters for, is fantasy. There are no Byzantine records for such an institution, and no records of the order exist before the 16th century. Furthermore, chivalric orders, especially in a western sense, were completely unknown in the Byzantine world. The earliest reference to the Constantinian Order in a form resembling that of the Angeli is from 1522, when statutes were issued by the grand master "Giovanni II Cesare Nemagna Paleologos, prince of the Slavonians and Romans". The early development of the order was thus not initiated by the Angeli themselves, though Giovanni Cesare's documents mention the Angeli family as members of the order. It is not clear whether Giovanni Cesare's order ever actually existed, or if it was an abortive attempt at founding such an institution, which later succeeded under the Angeli. No later members of Giovanni Cesare's Nemangna family (possibly claiming connections to the Serbian Nemanjić dynasty) ever challenged the Angeli for the grand mastership.

Coat of arms of the Angelo Flavio Comneno c.1551

Upon the death of Arianitto Arianiti, the last male-line member of the Arianiti family (also of Albanian descent) in Italy, in 1551, the Angeli family claimed his titular title of 'Prince of Macedonia'. Through Dorothea Arianiti, Paolo and Andrea's grandmother, the Angeli were related to the Arianiti family. Dorothea was the aunt of Arianitto's father Constantine Arianiti, meaning that Andrea and Paolo were Arianitto's third cousins. Some later members of the family later claimed that the title had been used by their family since at least Andres Engjëlli in the aftermath of Constantinople's fall.

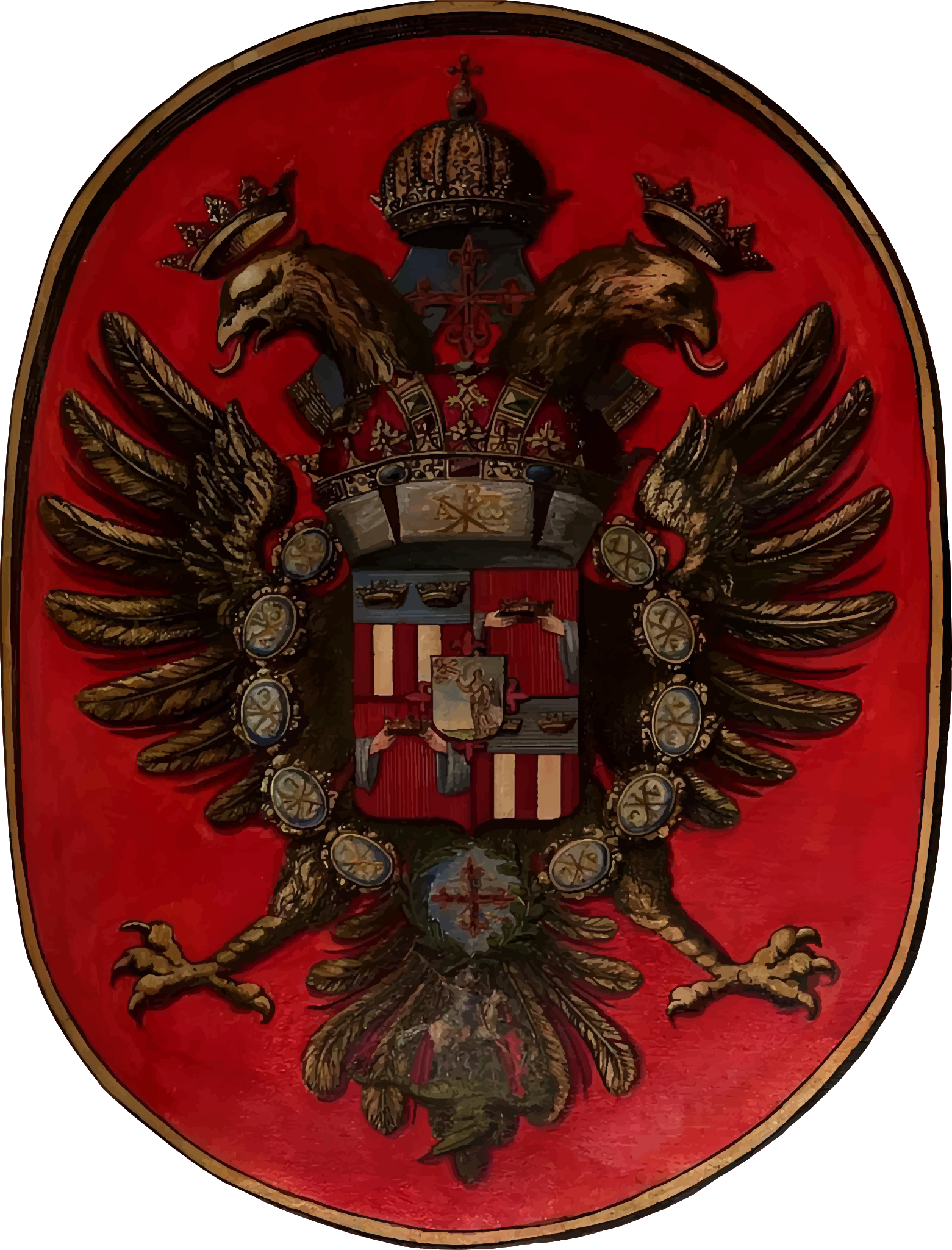
Coat of arms of the Angelo Flavio Comneno in 1680 with the Constantinian Order included

Because the Angeli had prominent familial connections in Italy and elsewhere, notably to the Arianiti family, also of Albanian descent, and through some means managed to convince the popes of the legitimacy of their descent and their order, they reached a position more or less unique among the various Byzantine claimants active in Western Europe during the 16th century. That the order was transferred hereditarily was firmly established through Andrea Angeli naming as heir his older brother Giovanni Demetrio's son, Pietro, and through Pietro, who succeeded to the position of grand master in 1580, naming his son, Giovanni Andrea I, as his heir. Because of the hereditary succession, and the increasing prestige of the order, the Angeli had to face several forgers and self-styled princes who claimed either relation with their family, or alternate lines of imperial descent themselves, so as to produce superior claims to the position. For the most part, such claimants were opportunists without actual links to Greek or Albanian families, and the Angeli were consistently successful in exposing fraudsters and maintaining their own rights.

Throughout their tenure as grand masters, the Angeli gradually inflated their family name. Whereas the early heads of the family simply used "Angeli" or "Angelo" (Angelus), "Flavio" (Flavius) was added by Pietro, followed by the addition of "Comneno" (Comnenus) by Giovanni Andrea I, producing the full set of names often used to refer to the family.

== Angeli princes (1551–1703) ==
1. Andrea Angeli (1551–1580), 'Prince of Macedonia, Duke and Count of Drivasto and Durazzo'.
  - Giovanni Demetrio Angeli (c. 1551–1571), 'Prince of Achaea, Cilicia and Macedonia', with Andrea and Girolamo I. Brother of Andrea.
  - Girolamo I Angeli (c. 1570–1591), 'Prince of Thessaly', with Andrea and Giovanni Demetrio. Brother of Andrea.
2. Pietro Angeli (1580–1592), 'Prince of Cilicia and Macedonia, Duke and Count of Drivasto and Durazzo'. Son of Giovanni Demetrio.
3. Giovanni Andrea I Angeli (1592–1634), 'Prince of Macedonia, Duke and Count of Drivasto and Durazzo'. Son of Pietro.
4. Angelo Maria Angeli (1634–1678), 'Prince of Macedonia and Thessaly, Duke and Count of Drivasto and Durazzo'. Grandson of Girolamo I.
5. Marco Angeli (1678–1679), 'Prince of Macedonia and Thessaly, Duke and Count of Drivasto and Durazzo'. Brother of Angelo Maria.
6. Girolamo II Angeli (1679–1687), 'Prince of Macedonia, Duke and Count of Drivasto and Durazzo'. Grandson of Girolamo I.
7. Giovanni Andrea II Angeli (1687–1703), 'Prince of Macedonia, Duke and Count of Drivasto and Durazzo'. Brother of Girolamo II.

== End of the family ==
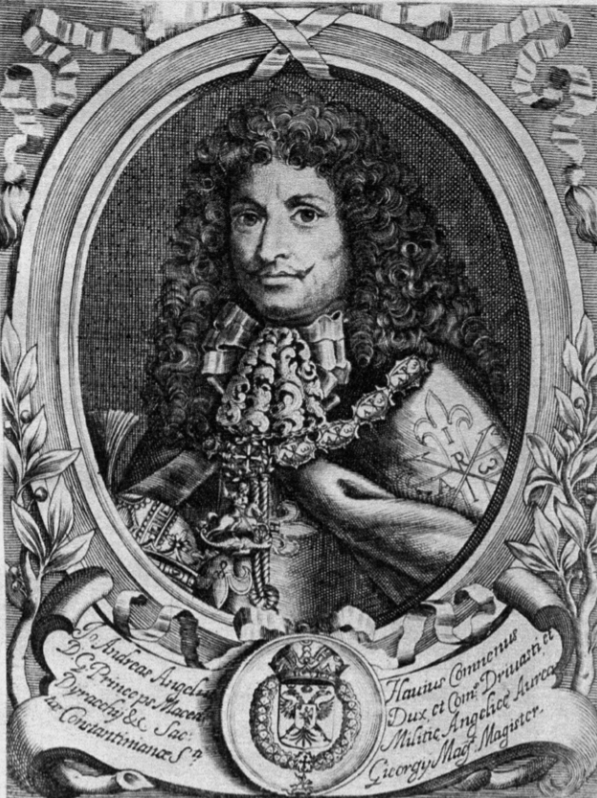
Giovanni Andrea II Angeli, the last of the Angeli princes

The Angeli ceased being grand masters of their order when those rights were granted to Francesco Farnese, the Duke of Parma, by Giovanni Andrea II Angeli in 1698. Farnese's right to the order was confirmed by Pope Innocent XII and Holy Roman Emperor Leopold I. The order exists to this day, now under the rule of the Bourbon family, confirmed as a religious-military order in a 1718 papal bull owing to a notable success in liberating Christians in the Peloponnese. Alongside the Sovereign Military Order of Malta it is the sole international Catholic Order which still has this status today. The male line of the Angeli family was rendered extinct with the death of the childless Giovanni Andrea II on 8 April 1703.

The family line was extinguished in 1756 with the death of Giovanni Andrea II's niece, Laura. Laura became nun in the convent of the Holy Spirit in Piacenza under the name "Maria Costanzo della Croce". Through surviving documents it is apparent that Laura had actually wished to marry and did not want to become a nun, but had been forced to by Francesco Farnese, who did not want to risk her having children; a potential future generation of rivals to his claim.

There were later attempts to claim male-line descent from the family. Gian Antonio Lazier, who died in Vienna in 1738, claimed descent not only from the Angeli but also from the despot Theodore II Palaiologos of the Palaiologos dynasty, his forged genealogy inserting himself into a garbled version of the Angeli genealogy, with many of the claimed Angeli ancestors transformed into Palaiologoi. Lazier referred to himself as "Johannes Antonius Angelus Flavius Comnenus Lascaris Palaeologus" and as "Princeps de genere Imperatorum Orientis" and claimed connection with the Constantinian Order. Lazier also claimed the title of 'Prince of Macedonia' among others, a claim that was continued by his opponent and later "successor" Radu Cantacuzino, before the titles fell into disuse. Among later "Byzantine pretenders", Lazier was not alone in making claims to the Constantinian order, or other invented chivalric orders. Many later forgers of Byzantine claims purported that they were either part of the Constantinian Order, or its legitimate grand master.

== Family tree ==
Follows Sainty (2018). Princes are marked with bold text, women are marked with italics.

Andrea d. before 1451 ∞ Dorothea Arianiti
Paolo; 1427–1468/69	Pietro; 1441/43–1511/12 ∞ Lucia Span
Alexis k. in battle	Paolo d. 1586	Giovanni Demetrio; 1499–1571 ∞ Franceschina Magna	Andrea Angeli d. 1580	Girolamo I 1505–1591 ∞ Ursula Bini
Pietro; 1526–1592 ∞ Lucrezia Beolchi	Michele Leone Salvatore; 1557–1623 ∞ Lucietta Michiel	Leone d. 1591	Pietro	Andrea; 1578–1644; Married five times	Ursula
Giovanni Andrea I 1569–1634	Giacomo Antonio d. after 1610	Girolamo d. before 1623	Angelo Maria; 1600–1678	Marco; 1608–1679	Ursula	Maria Altadonna; Married twice (Note: Maria Altadonna had a single son, by her second husband Giovanni Battista Vuković Lazari, named Michele, who later became vice-chancellor of the Constantinian Order.)	Laura	Girolamo II; 1629–1687 ∞ name unknown	Pietro d. young	Giovanni Andrea II; 1634–1703 ∞ N. Mandricardi
Laura d. 1756

== See also ==
- Succession to the Byzantine Empire
