= Pietro Angeli =

- Prince of Cilicia and Macedonia; Duke and Count of Drivasto and Durazzo

Grand Master of the Constantinian Order of Saint George
- Tenure: 1580–1592
- Predecessor: Andrea Angeli
- Successor: Giovanni Andrea I Angeli
- Born: 1526
- Died: 1592 (aged 65–66)
- Spouse: Lucrezia Beolchi
- Issue: Giovanni Andrea I Angeli; Giacomo Antonio Angeli
- House: Angelo Flavio Comneno
- Father: Giovanni Demetrio Angeli
- Mother: Franceschina Magna (?)

Pietro Angelo Flavio (Latin: Petrus Angelus Flavius; 1526–1592) was the Grand Master of the Constantinian Order of Saint George from 1580 to 1592. Pietro's family, the Angelo Flavio Comneno, claimed descent from the Angelos dynasty of Byzantine emperors, and Pietro also claimed the titles "Prince of Cilicia and Macedonia" and "Duke and Count of Drivasto and Durazzo".

== Biography ==
Pietro was born in 1526, as the son of Giovanni Demetrio Angeli and, possibly, Franceschina Magna. Pietro's family, the Angelo Flavio Comneno, claimed descent from the Angelos dynasty of Byzantine emperors. In the mid-15th century, his uncles Andrea and Paolo were officially acknowledged as descendants of the Angelos emperors by Pope Paul III (r. 1534–1549) and founded the Sacred Military Constantinian Order of Saint George, a chivalric order with invented Byzantine connections.

The eldest male member of his family of his generation, Pietro was proclaimed heir to the position of Grand Master by Andrea when Andrea was on his deathbed in 1580, "by reason of primogeniture". Pietro accession to the position in that year, and his own eventual proclamation of his eldest son, Giovanni Andrea I, as his heir, cemented the position of Grand Master as being hereditary. Giovanni Andrea was born on 20 March 1569. Pietro and his wife, Lucrezia Beolchi, also had a second son, Giacomo Antonio, who died before Giovanni Andrea. Pietro's last will, signed on his deathbed on either 29 or 30 July 1592, specified that in the event of the extinction of his own descendants, the Grand Mastership should pass to Michele, son of Pietro's uncle Girolamo I, who was co-Grand Master until 1591. Michele's branch of the family eventually succeeded to the position given that Pietro's sons were childless.

Pietro also had an adopted son, Giovanni Battista Gilio (attested in Latin in a 1602 document as "Ioannes Baptista Gilius Angelos Flavius Firmanos"), who was willed a portrait by an unknown artist from Bologna upon Pietro's death. Giovanni Battista continued to play a role in the Constantinian Order and the Angelo Flavio Comneno family after Pietro's death, verifying the succession of Giovanni Andrea I and later serving as the order's grand chancellor.

== See also ==
- Succession to the Byzantine Empire
