= Lazier =

Lazier is a surname. Notable people with the surname include:

- Bob Lazier (1938–2020), American racecar driver
- Buddy Lazier (born 1967), American racecar driver
- Gian Antonio Lazier (1678–1738), Italian impostor
- Jaques Lazier (born 1971), American racecar driver, brother of Buddy and son of Bob
