= Giovanni Demetrio Angeli =

- Prince of Achaea, Cilicia and Macedonia
- Born: 1499
- Died: 1571 (aged 71–72)
- Spouse: Franceschina Magna (?)
- Issue: Pietro Angeli
- House: Angelo Flavio Comneno
- Father: Pjetër Engjëlli
- Mother: Lucia Span

Giovanni Demetrio Angeli (Latin: Joannes Demetrius Angelus, Albanian: Gjon Dhimitër Engjëlli; 1499–1571) was an early member of the Albanian-Italian Angelo Flavio Comneno family, which claimed descent from the Angelos dynasty of Byzantine emperors. His later relatives attributed him various titles, such as "Prince of Achaea and Macedonia" and "Prince of Cilicia".

== History ==
Giovanni Demetrio was born in 1499, as the son of the Albanian noble Pjetër Engjëlli. Giovanni Demetrio's family, the Angelo Flavio Comneno, claimed descent from the Angelos dynasty of Byzantine emperors. In the mid-15th century, Giovanni Demetrio's younger brothers Andrea and Paolo were officially acknowledged as descendants of the Angelos emperors by Pope Paul III (r. 1534–1549) and founded the Sacred Military Constantinian Order of Saint George, a chivalric order with invented Byzantine connections.

Although no contemporary evidence survives for Giovanni Demetrio claiming any noble titles, he is accorded various titles in later texts published by his family, such as "Prince of Achaea and Macedonia" and "Prince of Cilicia". He was also considered by his later relatives to have been a Grand Master of the Constantinian Order, together with Andrea, but on account of the lack of evidence he is typically not counted as such in modern accounts of the order.

Giovanni Demetrio married a woman described as of the Venetian noble family "Franceschina" and as a "daughter of Bartolomeo Magna"; her name might thus have been Franceschina Magna. The couple had a single son, Pietro Angeli, born in 1526. Upon the death of Giovanni Demetrio's brother Andrea in 1580, Andrea named Pietro as his heir as Grand Master "by reason of primogeniture".

== See also ==
- Succession to the Byzantine Empire
