= Girolamo I Angeli =

- Prince of Thessaly

Grand Master of the Constantinian Order of Saint George
- Tenure: c. 1570–1591
- Predecessor: Andrea Angeli (alone)
- Successor: Giovanni Andrea I Angeli
- Born: 1505
- Died: 1591 (aged 85–86)
- Spouse: Ursula Bini
- Issue: Michele Angeli; Leone Angeli; Pietro Angeli; Andrea Angeli; Ursula Angeli
- House: Angelo Flavio Comneno
- Father: Pjetër Engjëlli
- Mother: Lucia Span

Girolamo I Angeli (Latin: Hieronymus Angelus; 1505–1591) was a joint, or rival, Grand Master of the Constantinian Order of Saint George from 1570 to 1591, together with, or against, his brother Andrea and then his nephew Pietro. Girolamo's family, the Angelo Flavio Comneno, claimed descent from the Angelos dynasty of Byzantine emperors, and Girolamo also claimed the title "Prince of Thessaly".

== Biography ==
Girolamo was born in 1505, as the son of the Albanian noble Pjetër Engjëlli. Giovanni Demetrio's family, the Angelo Flavio Comneno, claimed descent from the Angelos dynasty of Byzantine emperors. In the mid-15th century, Girolamo's older brothers Andrea and Paolo were officially acknowledged as descendants of the Angelos emperors by Pope Paul III (r. 1534–1549) and founded the Sacred Military Constantinian Order of Saint George, a chivalric order with invented Byzantine connections.

Girolamo was a rival claimant to the position of Grand Master, challenging Andrea, and managed to at one point secure recognition of the papacy, given that at least one surviving papal document refers to Girolamo as the Grand Master. Though Girolamo eventually accepted the principle of primogeniture, accepting the accession of his nephew Pietro Angeli in 1580, Girolamo remains recognized as a Grand Master, concurrent with Andrea and Pietro, in modern records of the Constantinian Order. Upon Giovanni Andrea I's death in 1634, Girolamo's branch of the family inherited the position of Grand Master as Giovanni Andrea was childless.

Girolamo had five children together with Ursula Bini: the sons Michele, Leone, Pietro and Andrea, and the daughter Ursula. Michele, the eldest son, was born on 22 February 1557. All of the children, except for Andrea, born on 29 June 1578, were technically illegitimate, given that they were born when Ursula was still married to her first husband, but Girolamo and Ursula did eventually marry, on 8 February 1575. Girolamo's at first adulterous relationship with Ursula Bini led to later issues concerning the Angeli succession, as the claims of Michele's children to the position of grand master would be challenged by Andrea.

== See also ==
- Succession to the Byzantine Empire
