= Perloz =

Perloz Pèrlo (Valdôtain)
- Comune
- Comune di Perloz; Commune de Perloz
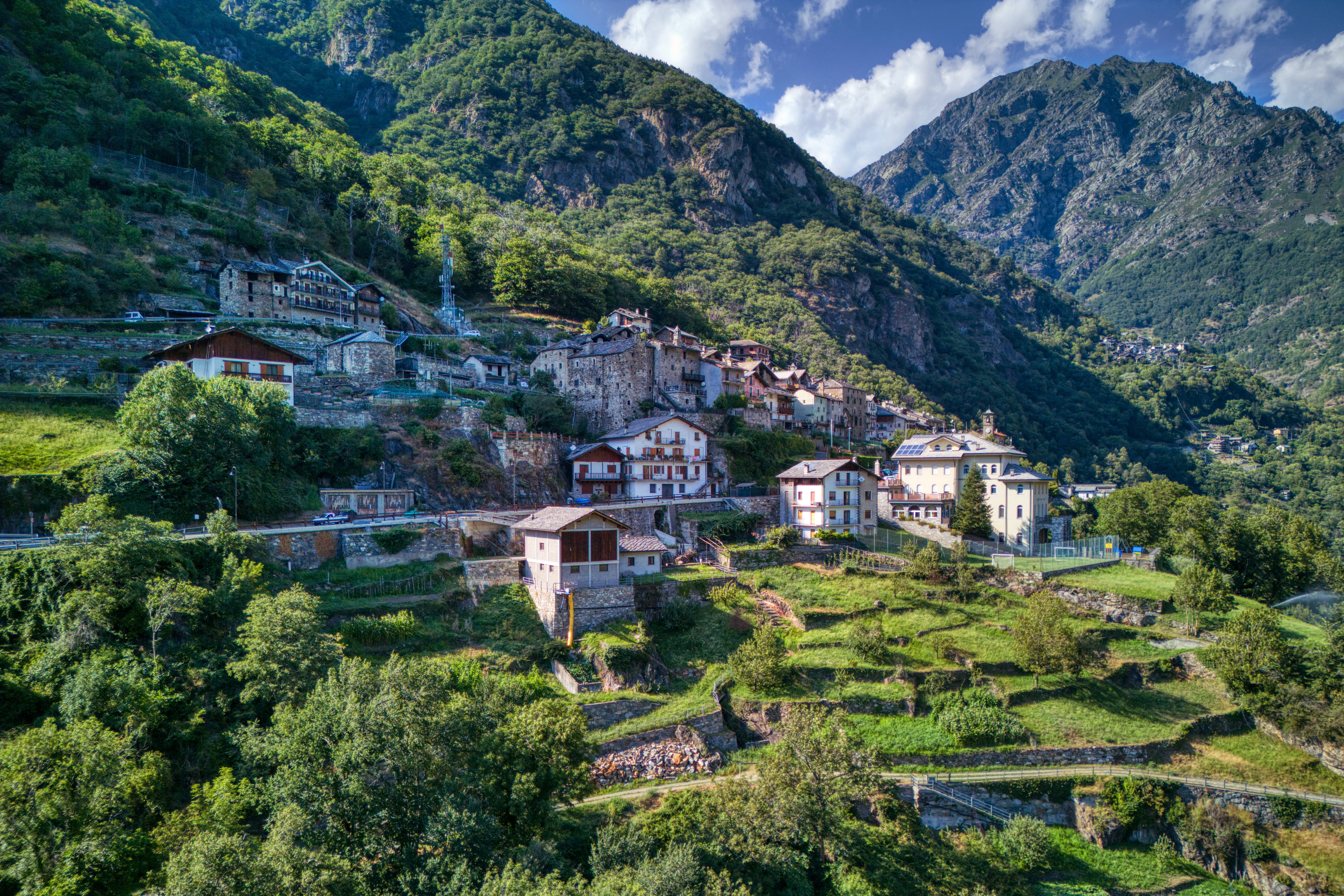

- Coat of arms

- Location within Italy Location within Aosta Valley
- Coordinates: 45°37′N 7°49′E
- Country: Italy
- Region: Aosta Valley
- Province: none
- Frazioni: Plan-de-Brun, Colleré, Bioley, Nantey, Fouillé, Breil, Estellé, Fey, Crête, Chemp, Ruine, Badéry, Derbellé, Miosse, Besesse, Ronc-Grange, Tour d'Héréraz, Barmet, Bois, Chamioux, Notre-Dame-de-la-Garde, Marine, Rechantez, Remondin, Ronc

Area
  - Total: 23 km^{2} (8.9 sq mi)
- Elevation: 661 m (2,169 ft)

Population (31 December 2022)
  - Total: 459
  - Density: 20/km^{2} (52/sq mi)
- Demonym: Perlois
- Time zone: UTC+1 (CET)
  - Summer (DST): UTC+2 (CEST)
- Postal code: 11002
- Dialing code: 0125
- ISTAT code: 7048
- Patron saint: Jesus
- Saint day: 14 January

Perloz (French: [pɛʁlo]; Valdôtain: Pèrlo) is a town and comune in the Aosta Valley region of northwestern Italy. The population from the 2011 census was at 453.

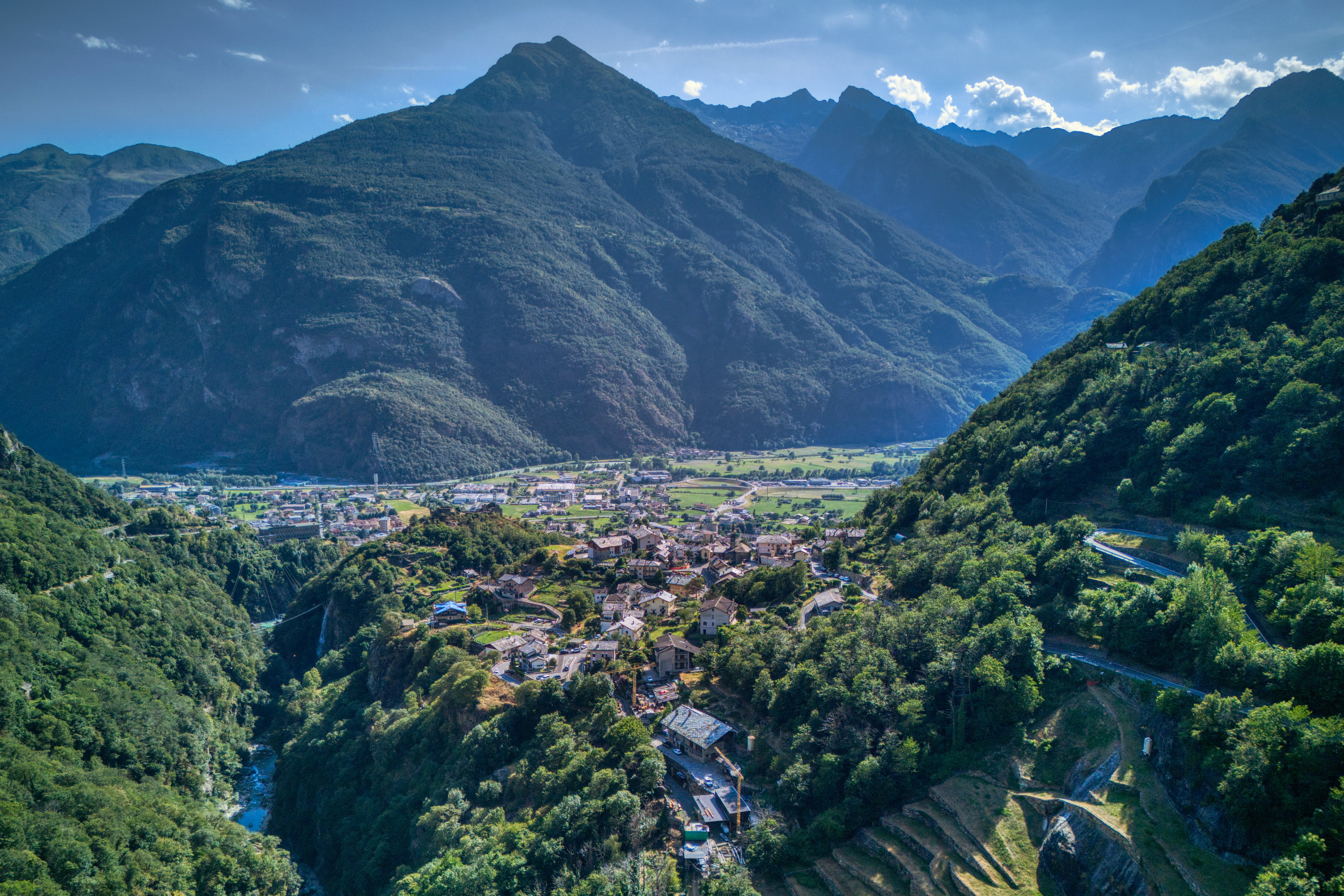
View of Plan-de-Brun.
