= Andrea Angeli =

- Prince of Macedonia; Duke and Count of Drivasto and Durazzo

Grand Master of the Constantinian Order of Saint George
- Tenure: c. 1545–1580
- Successor: Pietro Angeli
- Died: 1580
- House: Angelo Flavio Comneno
- Father: Pjetër Engjëlli
- Mother: Lucia Spani

Andrea Angeli (Latin: Andreas Angelus; died 1580) was the Grand Master of the Constantinian Order of Saint George from c. 1545 to 1580. Andrea and his brother Paolo were the founders of the Sacred Military Constantinian Order of Saint George and were papally recognized claimants to descent from the Angelos dynasty of Byzantine emperors. Andrea claimed the title "Duke and Count of Drivasto and Durazzo", and from the death of Arianitto Arianiti in 1551, also claimed the title "Prince of Macedonia".

== Biography ==
Andrea was a son of the Albanian noble Pjetër Engjëlli. Andrea's family, the Angelo Flavio Comneno, claimed descent from the Angelos dynasty of Byzantine emperors. In 1545, Andrea and his younger brother Paolo were officially acknowledged as descendants of the Angelos emperors by Pope Paul III (r. 1534–1549). The two brothers were also guaranteed the right to inherit territory in the former Byzantine Empire, should such territory be recovered from the Ottomans, and, as recognized heirs to the Byzantine imperial title, given the right to appoint princes and even kings themselves. The papacy was eager to support the two brothers and their family since a Catholic family of Byzantine claimants meant the possibility of eventually restoring the Byzantine Empire as a Catholic nation, religiously obedient to the Pope.

Andrea and Paolo founded the Sacred Military Constantinian Order of Saint George, a chivalric order with invented Byzantine connections. When exactly the order was founded is not clear, but Andrea is attested as using the title of Grand Master from Pope Paul III's acknowledgement of the brothers in 1545 and onwards. Andrea and Paolo claimed that their order was the successor of Constantine the Great's 'Labarum guard' and that it was of antique origin, founded either by Constantine himself in the 4th century or his later successor Heraclius in the 7th century, depending on the account. These claims were soon widely accepted throughout Europe. In 1551, Andrea claimed the title "Prince of Macedonia", after the death of the previous claimant to that title, Arianitto Arianiti, Andrea's third cousin. On his death in 1580, Andrea proclaimed his nephew Pietro as his heir "by reason of primogeniture", which ensured that his titles and position of Grand Master would pass down through the Angelo Flavio Comneno family in a hereditary manner.

== See also ==
- Succession to the Byzantine Empire
