= Drisht =

- Village
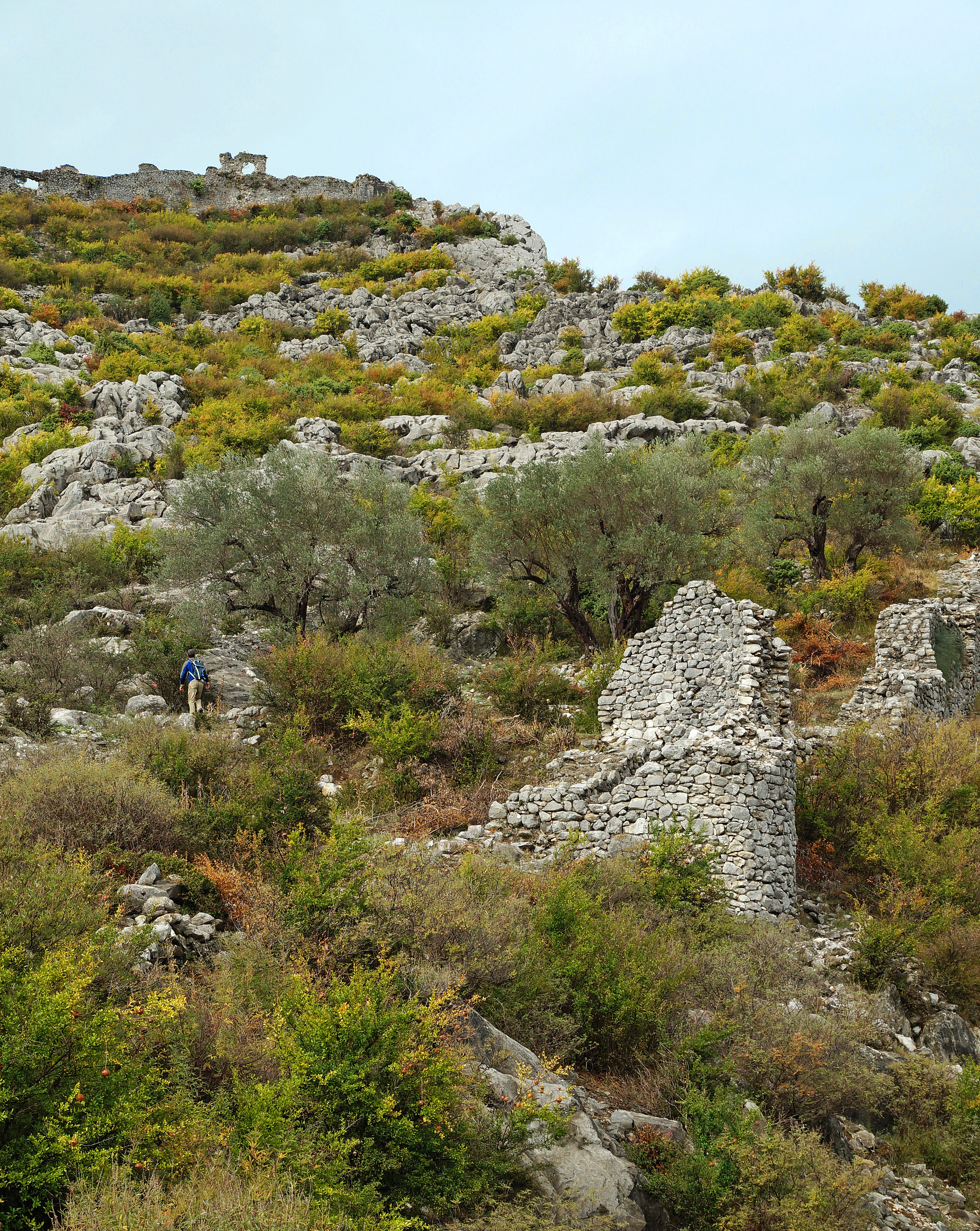
- Ruins of the old Drishti castle

- Location within Albania
- Coordinates: 42°7′23″N 19°35′29″E
- Country: Albania
- County: Shkodër
- Municipality: Shkodër
- Administrative unit: Postribë
- Elevation: 300 m (980 ft)
- Time zone: UTC+1 (CET)
  - Summer (DST): UTC+2 (CEST)

Drisht (Albanian definite form: Drishti) is a village, former bishopric and Latin titular see (Roman Catholic Diocese of Drivasto) with an Ancient and notable medieval history (Latin Drivastum, Italian Drivasto) in Albania, 6 km from Mesi Bridge (Albanian: Ura e Mesit). It is located in the former municipality Postribë in the Shkodër County. At the 2015 local government reform it became part of the municipality Shkodër. The ruined 13th Century Drisht Castle is on a hilltop 300m above sea level. The ruins of the castle itself contains the remains of 11 houses, and below the ruins of the castle, and above the modern village of Drisht are further archeological remains of late-Roman and medieval Drivastum.

== Name ==
The name of the settlement was recorded in Latin as Drivastum. Albanian Drisht derives from Drivastum through Albanian phonetic changes, however it has been noted that the accentual pattern found in Drísht < Drívastum presupposes an "Adriatic Illyrian" intermediary. Drisht follows Albanian continuity from the Latin Drivastum

== History ==
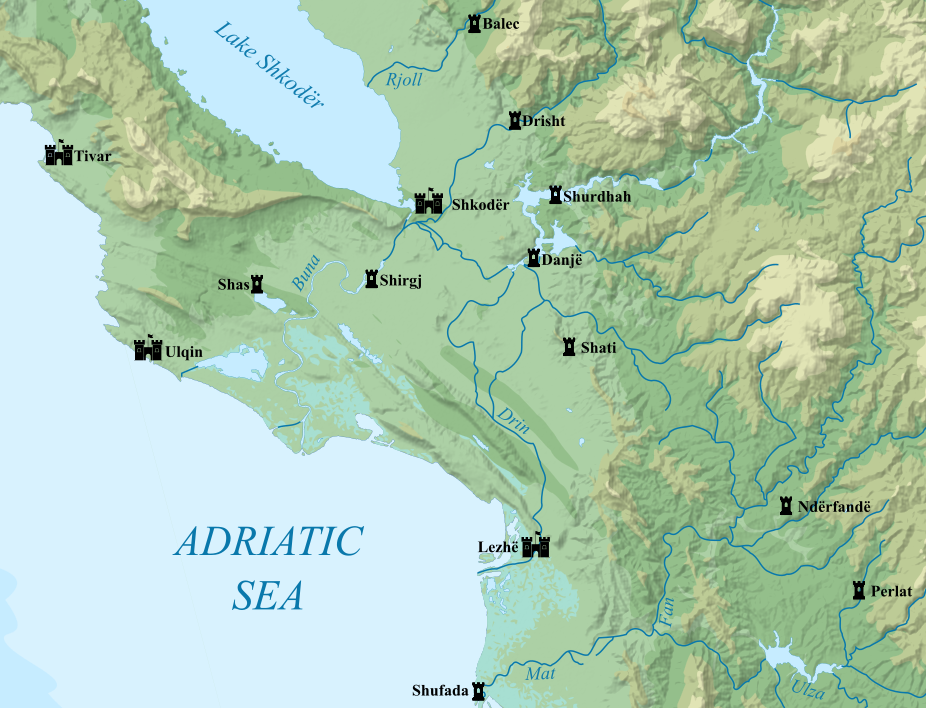
Drisht and nearby towns

The settlement of Drivastum is known to have existed before the tenth century AD. The Diocese of Drivastum became a suffragan of the Archdiocese of Antivari in 1089, after it was transferred from the Archdiocese of Ragusa.

In 1081—1116 Drivastum belonged to the kingdom of Duklja. In 1183, Serbian Stefan Nemanja conquered Drivast and its surroundings.

In 1241, the city was plundered by the Mongols under Subutai, as they were advancing east across Zeta, while heading home. A document from 1332 mentions the town was inhabited by Latins, while outside the town walls lived Albanians. Scholars estimate that Drivast was taken by the Balsha ca. spring of 1362. However, it is known that by 1363, they had captured Drivast and nearby Scutari.

In 1393, Gjergj II Balsha, having negotiated his freedom from Ottoman captivity, submitted to the Sultan's suzerainty and surrendered Drivast, Shirgj and Scutari. However, Gjergj soon ended his vassalage to the Ottomans and reconquered the cities he had surrendered mere months before. In 1395, knowing he could not outlast an Ottoman attack, he handed these cities, including Drivast, to dogal Venice in exchange for 1,000 ducats yearly.

In 1399, the townspeople in Drivasto (the city's new Italian name) and Scutari started a revolt against Venice, angered at the high taxes they were paying. The revolt lasted for three years, when Venetian troops managed to control the situation. However, the areas surrounding Drivast and Scutari no longer recognized Venetian authority.

Frustrated by Venice's policies regarding his former territories and its trade monopoly that resulted in economic stagnation in his ports, Gjergj II dispatched troops to reclaim his former lands, including Drivast, thereby violating his peace treaty with Venice. Gjergj's actions prompted Venice to suspect his involvement in instigating the uprising, though historians remain uncertain about the accuracy of this accusation. Additionally, the Turks mobilized raiding parties to these rebellious territories in response.

In 1423 Đurađ Branković conquered Drivast and annexed it to the Serbian Despotate. Supported by Ottomans, Gojčin Crnojević and Little Tanush Dukagjin, Maramonte plundered the region around Scutari and Ulcinj and attacked Drivast in 1429, but failed to capture it.

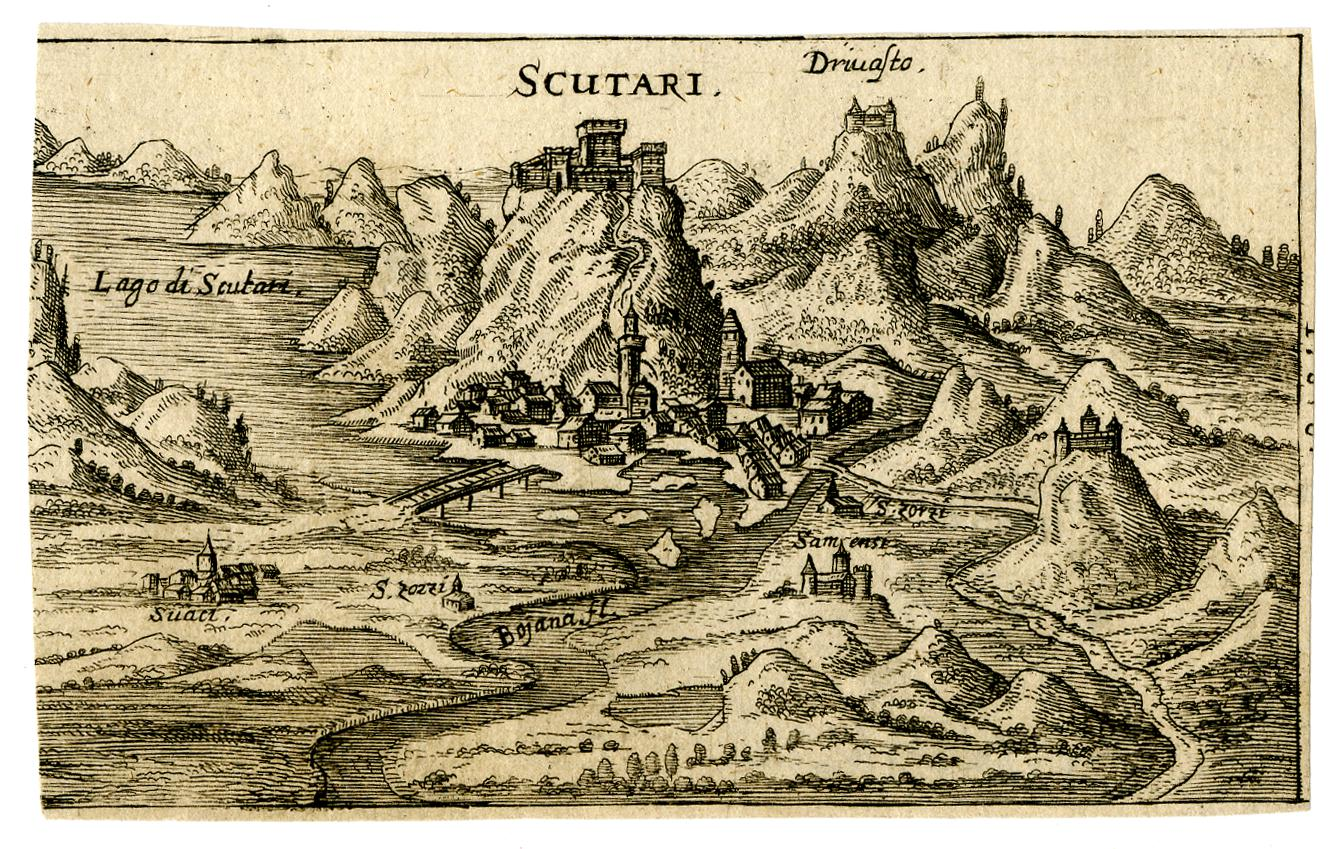
View of Shkodër in the distance and Drisht to the right - 17th century

In August 1442, Venice took Drivast from Serbian Despot Đurađ Branković. Native citizens of Drivast were hostile toward the advances of both Albanians and Serbs, so they accepted Venetian suzerainty under the condition that Venice wouldn't employ Albanian pronoiers and that the city's lands previously given to Serbs during the time of the Serbian Despotate would be returned to the cityfolk.

In 1447, Skanderbeg demanded from the Venetians to give control over Drivast to him, along with the lands which earlier belonged to Lekë Zakarija. However, the Venetians refused to accept his demands and Skanderbeg started the war against Venice.

In March 1451 Lekë Dukagjini and Bozhidar Dushmani planned to attack Venetian controlled Drivast. Their plot was discovered and Bozhidar was forced to exile.

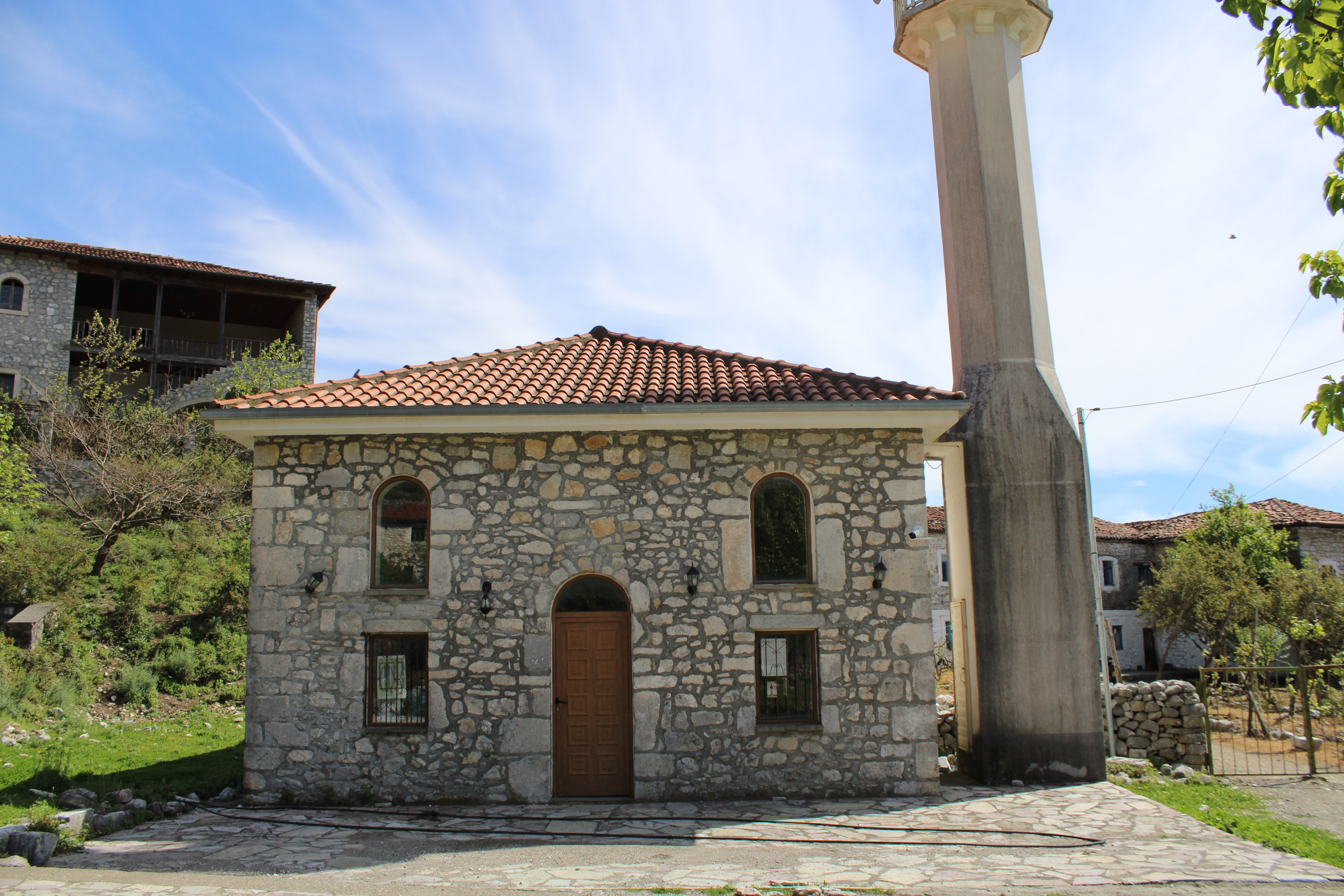
Old mosque of Drisht

In September 1478, Drivast was captured by the Ottomans.

=== Ecclesiastical History ===
The bishopric was founded around 400 AD, as a suffragan of its Late Roman province Dalmatia Superior's capital Doclea's Metropolitan bishop.

Drivastum became a suffragan of the Archdiocese of Antivari in 1089, after it was transferred from the Archdiocese of Ragusa. The townspeople of Drivast murdered one of their bishops in the thirteenth century.

The residential see was suppressed in 1650, its territory being merged into the Diocese of Shkodrë (in Albania).

=== Titular see ===
In 1933 the diocese was nominally restored as Latin Titular bishopric of Drivastum (Drivasto in Curiate Italian).

It has had the following incumbents, of the fitting episcopal (lowest) rank with two archiepiscopal (intermediary) exceptions :

- Cipriano Cassini (趙信義), Jesuits (S.J.) (1936.12.23 – 1946.04.11)
- Daniel Liston, Holy Ghost Fathers (C.S.Sp.) (1947.03.13 – 1949.12.19)
- João Floriano Loewenau, Friars Minor (O.F.M.) (1950.09.08 – 1979.06.04)
- Rafael Barraza Sánchez (1979.10.26 – 1981.10.19)
- Titular Archbishop Traian Crisan (1981.12.07 – 1990.11.06)
- Bruno Bertagna (1990.12.15 – 2007.02.15) (later Archbishop)
- Titular Archbishop Bruno Bertagna (2007.02.15 – 2013.10.31)
- Paul Tighe (2015.12.19 – ...), Adjunct Secretary of Pontifical Council for Culture, Member of Vatican Media Committee

== Modern Drisht ==
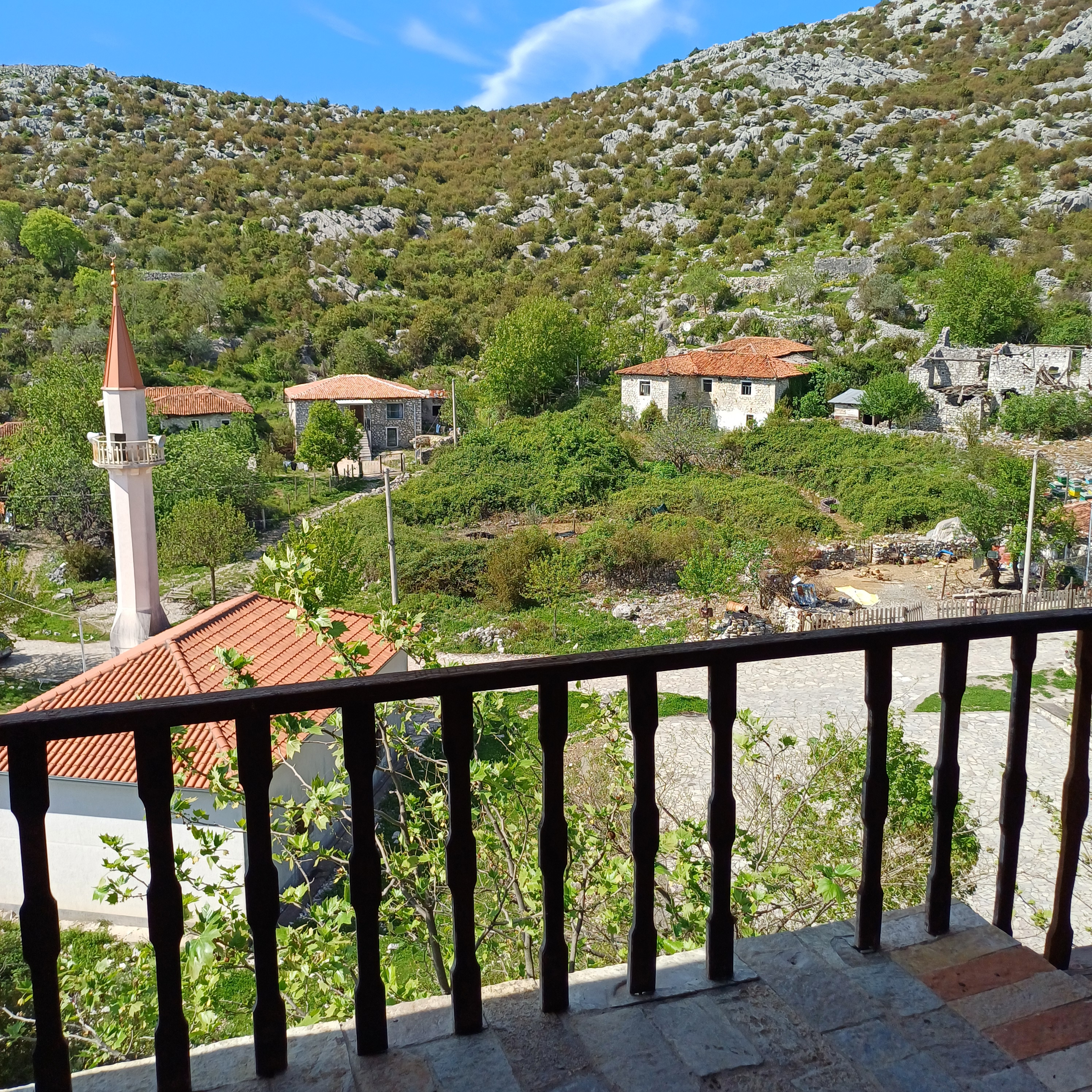
The mosque of Drisht

The population of modern Drisht is predominantly Muslim and Albanian speaking. Drisht is accessible by a 4x4 or by walking. It has both a mosque and a türbe.

== See also ==
- Statutes of Drivasto

== Sources ==
- Shala-Peli, Teuta (2014). Drishti në Mesjetë [Drisht in the Middle Ages] (Thesis). Academy of Sciences of Albania-Center of Albanological Studies.
- Božić, Ivan (1979). Nemirno pomorje XV veka (in Serbian). Belgrade: Srpska književna zadruga. OCLC 5845972.
- Demiraj, Shaban (2006). The origin of the Albanians: linguistically investigated. Tirana: Academy of Sciences of Albania. ISBN 978-99943-817-1-5.
- Huld, Martin E. (1986). "Accentual Stratification of Ancient Greek Loanwords in Albanian". Zeitschrift für vergleichende Sprachforschung. 99 (2). Vandenhoeck & Ruprecht (GmbH & Co. KG): 245–253. JSTOR 40848841.
- Matzinger, Joachim (2009). "Shqiptarët si pasardhës të ilirëve nga këndvështrimi i gjuhësisë historike". In Schmitt, Oliver Jens; Frantz, Eva Anne (eds.). Historia e Shqiptarëve: Gjendja dhe perspektivat e studimeve (in Albanian). Translated by Pandeli Pani and Artan Puto. Botime Përpjekja. pp. 13–39. ISBN 978-99943-0-254-3.
- GCatholic with incumbent bio links
