= Andreas Palaiologos (disambiguation) =

Andreas Palaiologos or Andrew Palaeologus (Greek: Ἀνδρέας Παλαιολόγος, romanized: Andreas Palaiológos) may refer to:

- Andreas Palaiologos (fl. 1342–1349), leader of the Zealots of Thessalonica
- Andreas Palaiologos (1453–1502), titular Emperor of Constantinople 1483–1494, 1498–1502 and Despot of the Morea 1465–1502
- Andreas Palaiologos (son of Manuel) (fl. 1520), son of Manuel Palaiologos
