= Constantine Palaiologos (disambiguation) =

Constantine Palaiologos or Palaeologus (Greek: Κωνσταντῖνος Παλαιολόγος, romanized: Konstantínos Palaiológos) may refer to:

- Constantine Palaiologos (half-brother of Michael VIII) (d.1271), half-brother of Michael VIII Palaiologos and grandfather of Theodora Smilets of Bulgaria
- Constantine Palaiologos (son of Michael VIII) (1261–1306), son of Michael VIII Palaiologos
- Constantine Palaiologos (son of Andronikos II) (fl. 1292–1320s), despotes, son of Andronikos II Palaiologos
- Constantine XI Palaiologos (1405–1453), last ruler of the Byzantine Empire in 1449–1453
- Constantine Palaiologos (Papal Guard) (d. 1508), commander of the Papal Guard, possibly son of Andreas Palaiologos
