= Maria Palaiologina (disambiguation) =

Maria Palaiologina (Greek: Μαρία Παλαιολογίνα) may refer to:

- Maria Palaiologina (fl. 1265–1282), daughter of Emperor Michael VIII and Khatun of the Ilkhanate
- Maria Palaiologina Kantakouzene (fl. 1249–1294), niece of Emperor Michael VIII and Empress of Bulgaria
- Maria Palaiologina, Queen of Serbia (died 1355), great-granddaughter of Emperor Michael VIII
- Maria-Irene Palaiologina (1327–1399), Byzantine princess and Bulgarian empress consort
- Maria Palaiologina (Princess of Vereya) (died 1505), possibly a daughter of Andreas Palaiologos
- Mary Paleologus (died 1674), daughter of Theodore Paleologus
