= Solidary obligations =

Legal obligation in civil law jurisprudence

A solidary obligation, or an obligation in solidum, is a type of obligation in the civil law jurisprudence that allows either obligors to be bound together, each liable for the whole performance, or obligees to be bound together, all owed just a single performance and each entitled to the entirety of it. In general, solidarity of an obligation is never presumed, and it must be expressly stated as the true intent of the parties' will. Contractual solidary obligations are frequently created by insurance policies or co-signing a loan. A common example of a solidary obligation created thorough operation of law is vicarious liability such as respondeat superior.

Solidarity can be either active or passive. A solidary obligation that is active exists among the obligees (creditors) in the transaction. It is passive when it exists among the obligors (debtors) in a transaction. A solidary obligation is almost always an advantage for a creditor because it will either allow any creditor to demand the entirety of the debt from the sole debtor when the solidarity is active, or it will allow the creditor to demand the entirety of the debt from any of the multiple debtors when it is passive.

The origin of solidarity can be traced to a Roman idea known as correality where a single thing was owed by more than one person. Under these circumstances, there was just a single obligation. There was a transformation and growth of this idea during the ius commune before being codified in the Napoleonic Code of 1804.

In Louisiana law, solidary obligations are governed by articles 1789–1806 of the Louisiana Civil Code.

== Solidary obligations for obligees ==
This is known as active solidarity. An obligation is solidary for the obligees when it gives each obligee the right to demand the whole performance from the common obligor.

For example, if A and B together lend two hundred dollars to C, and it is agreed that each can have the right to seek the whole amount from C upon repayment, C's obligation to repay the money is solidary for the obligees A and B. Generally, full payment to any of the solidary obligees extinguishes the obligation.

A common example of solidary obligations for the obligees is a joint bank account; when two or more names are on an account, they are obligees of the bank's obligation to make funds available on demand. Each obligee would have the right to withdraw the whole amount in the bank account.

== Solidary obligations for obligors ==
This is known as passive solidarity. An obligation is solidary for the obligors when each obligor is liable for the whole performance in such a way that a whole performance rendered by one of the obligors relieves the others of liability toward the obligee. In practice, this is much more frequent than active solidarity. When one co-signs a loan for another, they both become solidary obligors in relation to the debt owed. In regard to liability of the obligors between themselves, the proportions owed by each obligor in a solidary obligation stemming from a contract are deemed to be equal unless a provision in the agreement states otherwise.

Passive solidarity can also be created as an operation of law. In the case of an offense or a tort, if a person has sustained damage because of the shared fault of others, the offenders may be liable in solido in proportion to their fault.

== Renunciation of solidarity ==
Since passive solidarity is mainly a guarantee and benefit for the creditor or obligee, he may renounce it at his pleasure. He may renounce it in favor of one or all of the obligors. If he renounces solidarity for only one of the obligors, this has the important effect of preserving his right to demand the whole performance from the remaining obligors bound in solido, minus the portion owed by the one whose solidarity was renounced. The other obligors could no longer seek any type of contribution from the renounced obligor if one were then required to render the whole performance. The renunciation of solidarity must be express, although it need not be done in any formal manner.

Generally, renunciation of solidarity takes place when he received a partial payment from one of the obligors, although the payment itself does not imply a renunciation. Under the Louisiana Civil Code, an obligee who received a partial performance from an obligor separately will still preserve the solidary obligation against all of the obligors after deduction of that partial performance.

== Debt relief ==
When the debt is cancelled, the creditor forgives the debt, thereby releasing that debtor from the whole obligation. In the context of a solidary obligation, if the obligee cancels the debt of some—but not all—of the obligors, the obligation is reduced by an amount proportionate to those whose debts have been cancelled; the obligee preserves his right to demand the whole from any of the remaining obligors, although his right is limited only to the uncancelled debt.

Unlike the renunciation of a solidary debt, a cancellation affects the object of the entire obligation. It is akin to eliminating that obligor from the obligation. In order to cancel a debt, the traditional method is for the obligee to surrender the debt instrument that evidences the obligation to the obligor. Such a surrender creates a presumption that the debt cancellation was intended to benefit all solidary obligors; this may be rebutted by evidence showing the intent was only to cancel in favor of the obligor to whom the debt instrument was surrendered rather than all of the obligors.

== Insolvency of a solidary obligor ==
If one of the solidary obligors becomes insolvent, such as through bankruptcy, his portion of the debt must be covered by each of the remaining solidary obligors in proportion to their own portions. The insolvency of one or more obligors does not affect the overall relationship between the obligors and the obligee, however, because he still can demand full performance from just one of them.

Even if an obligor has had his solidarity renounced, he still must contribute in some way to make up for the loss resulting in another obligor becoming insolvent; all of the solidary obligors bear the loss arising from insolvency of a solidary obligor in proportion to their portions. However, an obligor who has had his solidarity renounced would never be liable for more than his fair portion if an obligor never becomes insolvent. In this way renunciation of solidarity can be viewed as a middle ground between complete obligation in solidum and from the complete freedom from obligation that debt cancellation results in.

For example, assume A, B, C, and D are liable in solido to X for $10,000. This means of course that X can look to any of these four solidary obligors for the full amount. Assume that X renounces solidarity in favor of A, who pays X $2,500, and that B thereafter goes bankrupt. Unfortunately, there is still $7,500 owed to X, who can collect that amount from either C or D. A's share is now 1/3 (approximately $3,333) because his share has been affected by B's bankruptcy. Assuming the C pays X $7,500, he can seek contribution from D for $3,333 and from A for $833, which is his share of $3,333 minus the amount he already contributed of $2,500.

== Indemnity ==
If the circumstances giving rise to the solidary obligation only concern one of the obligors, then that obligor is liable for the whole obligation. The other obligors are only considered sureties. This means that although the unconcerned parties may be forced to pay the obligee some or all of the money, they can seek the entirety of their contribution from the concerned obligor in full.

== Interruption of prescription ==
The interruption of liberative prescription against one solidary obligor is effective against all of the solidary obligors. Thus, any action that would normally interrupt prescription as to one of the obligors will also prevent the debt from prescribing as to all of the other obligors.

== See also ==
- Law of obligations
- Joint and several liability, common law rough equivalent
