= Constantine Palaiologos (Papal Guard) =

Greek noble and soldier

- Born: 15th century
- Died: 1508; Rome
- Noble family: Palaiologos (?)
- Father: Andreas Palaiologos (?)
- Mother: Caterina (?)

Constantine Palaiologos or Palaeologus (Greek: Κωνσταντῖνος Παλαιολόγος, romanized: Kōnstantinos Palaiologos; died 1508) was a 16th-century noble of Greek descent who served as a soldier in Italy. By the time of his death in 1508, he served the Papal States, having risen through the ranks to become the commander of the Papal Guard.

There are no primary sources that can confirm his parentage or possible connections to the Palaiologos dynasty, the final ruling family of the Byzantine Empire (which they ruled 1259/1261–1453). In 1965, British historian Steven Runciman identified Constantine as the son of Andreas Palaiologos, a nephew of the final Byzantine emperor (and Constantine's namesake) Constantine XI Palaiologos. Andreas, otherwise commonly believed not to have left any descendants, died poor in Rome in 1502. Runciman referred to Constantine as "handsome but worthless". In 1980, Runciman was no longer as confident in Constantine's parentage, writing that Andreas "was said to have left a son called Constantine". British historian Donald Nicol also believed Constantine to have been a son of Andreas, as does genealogist Peter Mallat. It is possible that he can be identified with a "Constantinus de Morea", mentioned as the receiver of a pension by Pope Innocent VIII (r. 1484–1492).

Constantine died in obscurity and he is not known to have had any children. The known members of the Imperial Palaiologos dynasty were rendered extinct shortly thereafter with the deaths of Andreas's brother Manuel Palaiologos in the reign of the Ottoman sultan Bayezid II (r. 1481–1512) and the death of Manuel's son Andreas in the reign of sultan Suleiman the Magnificent (r. 1520–1566). British historian Russell Foster considered Constantine a suitable end to the line of Roman emperors, writing:

Andreas' only son, Constantine Palaiologos, the last male heir of the Roman Imperial line traceable back to Julius Caesar, died in 1508 as a common soldier in Rome – a fitting end to fifteen centuries of Roman Imperators.
