= Andreas Palaiologos =

Prince of the Palaiologos dynasty

- Emperor and Autocrat of the Romans
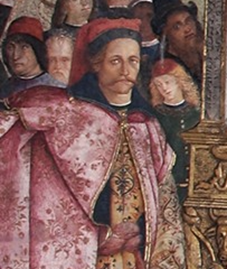
- Probable portrait of Andreas as part of Pinturicchio's St Catherine's Disputation (1491) in the Hall of the Saints in the Borgia Apartments, Vatican Palace

Eastern Roman emperor (titular claimant)
- 1st reign: 13 April 1483 – 6 November 1494
- Predecessor: Constantine XI Palaiologos (Note: After Constantine XI's death in 1453, his most clear heirs were his brothers, Demetrios and Thomas Palaiologos (Andreas's father), but neither claimed the imperial title. Andreas was the first of his family to claim the title after Constantinople's fall.)
- Successor: Charles VIII of France
- 2nd reign: 7 April 1498 – June 1502
- Predecessor: Charles VIII of France (Note: Andreas had sold his self-proclaimed imperial title to Charles VIII of France in 1494 on the condition that he be granted Greek lands regained in a potential crusade. Since this never happened, Andreas considered the title to have returned to him upon Charles's death in 1498. French kings after Charles VIII however continued to claim the titular style 'Emperor of Constantinople' until it was abandoned under Charles IX in 1566.)
- Successor: None (Note: Andreas's genealogical heir(s) would have been his children (if he had any) or his younger brother, Manuel. Upon his death, Andreas however willed the title of 'Emperor of Constantinople' to Ferdinand II of Aragon and Isabella I of Castile. Unlike the French kings, neither monarch, nor any of their descendants, ever used or even acknowledged the title. Since Andreas's death, numerous forgers and imposters have falsely claimed Byzantine descent and titles, though none have been widely recognized.)

Despot of the Morea (titular)
- Reign: 12 May 1465 – June 1502
- Predecessor: Thomas Palaiologos
- Successor: Fernando Palaiologos; Constantine Arianiti (both self-proclaimed)
- Born: 17 January 1453; Morea
- Died: June 1502 (aged 49); Rome
- Burial: St. Peter's Basilica, Rome
- Spouse: Caterina
- Dynasty: Palaiologos
- Father: Thomas Palaiologos
- Mother: Catherine Zaccaria

Andreas Palaiologos (Greek: Ἀνδρέας Παλαιολόγος; 17 January 1453 – June 1502), sometimes anglicized to Andrew Palaeologus, was the eldest son of Thomas Palaiologos, Despot of the Morea. Thomas was a brother of Constantine XI Palaiologos, the final Byzantine emperor. After his father's death in 1465, Andreas was recognized as the titular Despot of the Morea and from 1483 onwards, he also claimed the title "Emperor of Constantinople" (Latin: Imperator Constantinopolitanus). (Note: Imperator Constantinopolitanus (Emperor of Constantinople) was the style used by Andreas in Latin-language documents. In Greek-language documents, he styled himself as Ἀνδρέας ἐν Χριστῷ τῷ Θεῷ πιστὸς βασιλεὺς καὶ αὐτοκράτωρ Ῥωμαίων ὁ Παλαιολόγος (Andreas in Christ the God, faithful Emperor and Autocrat of the Romans, the Palaiologos), a more traditional rendition of the Byzantine imperial title.)

After the fall of Constantinople in 1453 and the subsequent Ottoman invasion of the Morea in 1460, Andreas's father fled to Corfu with his family. After Thomas died in 1465, the then twelve-year-old Andreas moved to Rome and, as the eldest nephew of Constantine XI, became the head of the Palaiologos family and the chief claimant to the ancient imperial throne. Andreas's later use of the imperial title, never claimed by his father, was supported by some of the Byzantine refugees who lived in Italy and he hoped to one day restore the empire of his ancestors. Andreas married a Roman woman called Caterina. Though some primary sources allude to the possibility that he had children, there is no concrete evidence that Andreas left any descendants.

As his stay in Rome continued, Andreas fell deeper into poverty. Although historians often blame his impoverished situation on a supposedly extravagant and irresponsible lifestyle, a more likely explanation is that the pension and funding provided to him by the papacy were regularly reduced. Andreas traveled around Europe several times in search of a ruler who could aid him in retaking Constantinople but rallied little support. The Ottoman Sultan Mehmed II, who had conquered Constantinople in 1453, died in 1481, and his two sons Cem and Bayezid fought a civil war over who would succeed him. Seeing his opportunity, Andreas attempted to organize an expedition in southern Italy during the summer of 1481 to cross the Adriatic Sea and restore the Byzantine Empire. The excursion was canceled in the autumn after Bayezid had successfully stabilized his rule. Although Andreas maintained hope of recapturing at least the Morea throughout his life, he never returned to Greece.

Desperate for money, Andreas sold his rights to the Byzantine crown in 1494 to Charles VIII of France, who attempted to organize a crusade against the Ottomans. The sale was conditional on Charles, who Andreas hoped to use as a champion against the Ottomans, conquering the Morea and granting it to Andreas. When Charles died in 1498, Andreas once again claimed the imperial titles, using them until his death. He died in poverty in Rome in 1502 and was buried in St. Peter's Basilica. In his will, he granted his titles to Ferdinand II of Aragon and Isabella I of Castile, neither of whom used them.

== Background ==
The Despotate of the Morea, a province of the Byzantine Empire, c. 1450

The Palaiologos family was the last imperial dynasty of the Byzantine Empire and one of the empire's longest ruling dynasties, ruling the empire from 1259/1261 to its fall in 1453. By the 15th century, the Palaiologan emperors ruled a disintegrating and dwindling empire. Over the course of the 14th century, the Ottoman Turks had conquered vast swaths of territories and by the beginning of the 15th century, they ruled much of Anatolia, Bulgaria, central Greece, Serbia, Macedonia and Thessaly. The Byzantine Empire, once extending throughout the eastern Mediterranean, was more or less reduced to the imperial capital of Constantinople itself, the Peloponnese and a handful of islands in the Aegean Sea, and was forced to pay tribute to the Ottomans.

As the empire dwindled, the emperors came to the conclusion that the only way to ensure that their remaining territory was kept intact was to grant some of their holdings to their sons or brothers, who received the title of despot, as appanages to defend and govern. In 1428, Andreas's father, Thomas Palaiologos, was appointed as Despot of the Morea, governing the prosperous province that constituted the parts of the Peloponnese under Byzantine control together with his older brothers Theodore and Constantine (who would later become Emperor Constantine XI, the final emperor). The brothers worked to restore Byzantine control of the entire peninsula. In 1432, Thomas brought an end to the Principality of Achaea, founded after the Fourth Crusade, by inheriting it through his marriage to Catherine Zaccaria, the daughter of Centurione II Zaccaria, the last Prince of Achaea. During Constantine's, Theodore's and Thomas's rule as despots, Byzantine rule was restored to the entire Morea, save for the scattered towns and port cities under the authority of the Republic of Venice, also holdovers from the Fourth Crusade.

As their empire crumbled, the Orthodox Palaiologan emperors pursued a policy of attempting to secure military aid from Catholic Europe. Since the middle of the 14th century, the Byzantine emperors had looked to Western Europe and the papacy in the hope of securing help to save their empire from the Ottomans. Inspired by the writings of West-oriented intellectuals such as Demetrios Kydones and Manuel Chrysoloras, the Palaiologan emperors believed that if they could only convince the popes of their lack of heresy, the papacy would unleash large western armies to relieve them. This conviction inspired Andreas's great-grandfather John V Palaiologos to travel to Rome and personally submit to the pope in 1369 and his uncle John VIII Palaiologos to attend the 1438–1439 Council of Florence where a union of the churches was proclaimed. The union of the churches was unpopular in the Byzantine Empire, where the populace felt that it was a betrayal to their faith and world view, and it was never fully implemented. John VIII's successor and Andreas's other uncle Constantine XI had sent desperate appeals for help to the pope in 1452 when the Ottomans were closing in on Constantinople.

== Biography ==
=== Early life ===
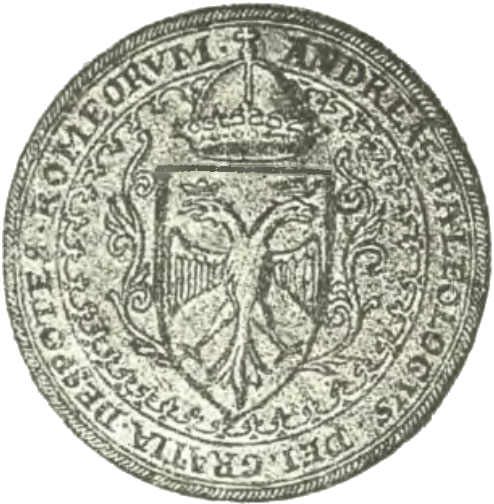
Seal of Andreas with the inscription "Andreas Palaiologos, by the grace of God, Despot of the Romans"

Constantine XI Palaiologos, the last Byzantine emperor, died defending Constantinople from the Ottomans on 29 May 1453. Andreas had been born just four months earlier, on 17 January 1453, as the oldest son of Thomas Palaiologos and Catherine Zaccaria. Following the Ottoman conquest of Constantinople, Andreas's family continued to live in the Morea as vassals of the Ottoman Sultan Mehmed II. However, constant bickering between Thomas, who tried to rally support to restore the Byzantine Empire, and his older brother Demetrios, who sided with the Ottomans, led to the Sultan invading the Morea in 1460; Thomas and his family escaped to Corfu. Thomas then left the rest of the family to go to Rome, where he was welcomed and financially supported by Pope Pius II. Thomas maintained hope that he would one day recover his lands and when preparations were being made for a crusade in 1462, which never took place, Thomas personally rode around Italy to drum up support.

Catherine Zaccaria died in August 1462, but it was only in spring 1465 that Thomas summoned the children to Rome. Andreas, his younger brother Manuel, and their sister Zoe, accompanied by their guardian and some exiled Byzantine nobles, arrived at Ancona, but they never met their father, who died on 12 May.

Andreas was 12 years old at the time, and Manuel was 10. Zoe's age is unknown, but she was the oldest of the three. The children went on to Rome, where they were put in the care of Cardinal Bessarion, who had also fled the Byzantine Empire many years ago. Bessarion was one of the few Byzantine clerics who had supported the union of the churches. He provided an education for the children and was the mastermind behind Zoe's marriage to Grand Prince Ivan III of Moscow, which was arranged in June 1472. Andreas continued to stay in Rome by consent of Pope Paul II, who recognized him as the heir of Thomas and the Despot of the Morea. Andreas converted to the Roman Catholic Church.

Initially, Andreas's seal bore the double-headed eagle of the Palaiologan emperors and the title "By the grace of God, Despot of the Romans" (Latin: Dei gratia despotes Romeorum). Perhaps in response to feeling as if he was not receiving the respect due to him, Andreas eventually started styling himself as the "Emperor of Constantinople" (Latin: Imperator Constantinopolitanus), a title never adopted by his father. The first recorded use of that title was on 13 April 1483, when he issued a chrysobull to the Spanish nobleman Pedro Manrique, Count of Osorno, authorizing him and his descendants to bear the arms of the Palaiologan emperors, to create palatine counts, and to naturalize his illegitimate offspring. Though this title differed from the traditional title used by the Byzantine emperors ("Emperor and Autocrat of the Romans"), it was the traditional designation used for the Byzantine emperors by western Europeans, in particular the papacy. Though Jonathan Harris believes that Andreas's upbringing in Rome could have left him unaware that his title differed from the version actually used by the Byzantine emperors, Andreas did render his imperial title as the standard Byzantine version on those occasions when he rendered it in Greek. (Note: In the 13 April 1483 chrysobull, Andreas wrote the Greek version of his title as Ἀνδρέας ἐν Χριστῷ τῷ Θεῷ πιστὸς βασιλεὺς καὶ αὐτοκράτωρ Ῥωμαίων ὁ Παλαιολόγος ("Andreas in Christ the God, faithful Emperor and Autocrat of the Romans, the Palaiologos").)

Although hereditary succession had never been officially used in the Byzantine Empire, Andreas was recognized as the rightful heir by some of his contemporaries, most prominently Cardinal Bessarion. One of Thomas Palaiologos's advisors from Patras, George Sphrantzes, visited Andreas in 1466 and recognized him as "the successor and heir of the Palaiologan dynasty" and his rightful ruler. Outside of his aspirations of restoring his empire, Andreas's claim to be an emperor was mostly expressed through insisting on various honors, such as insisting that he be allowed to carry the same type of candle as the cardinals during a 1486 procession in the Sistine Chapel.

=== Financial troubles ===
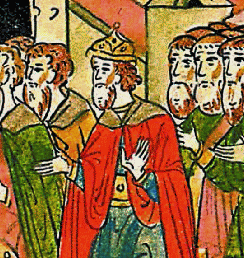
Andreas Palaiologos during his visit to Moscow, as depicted in a 16th-century Russian chronicle

The financial troubles which would persist throughout Andreas's life began shortly after Cardinal Bessarion died in 1472. By 1475, at the age of 22, Andreas had begun offering to sell his claims to the imperial thrones of both Constantinople and Trebizond (the Empire of Trebizond being a Byzantine successor state which lasted until 1461), writing letters to several rulers, including the King of Naples (Ferdinand I) and possibly the Duke of Milan (Galeazzo Maria Sforza) and the Duke of Burgundy (Charles). By writing to many different rulers, Andreas was probably looking for the highest bidder. Andreas's younger brother Manuel also fell into financial hardship but had no titles to sell as he was second-in-line. Instead, Manuel left Rome to travel around Europe, seeking to enter the service of a ruler in some military capacity. Receiving no satisfactory offers, Manuel surprised everyone in Rome by traveling to Constantinople in the spring of 1476 and presenting himself before Sultan Mehmed II, who graciously received him and provided him with a generous pension for the rest of his life.

The origin of the financial hardship experienced by Andreas and Manuel likely lies with reductions to the pension paid to them by the papacy. The amount paid initially to their father Thomas had been 300 ducats a month, with an additional 200 per month from the cardinals. Thomas's courtier George Sphrantzes complained that it was barely enough since Thomas not only had to support himself, but also his household. Although Andreas and Manuel were granted the same pension at first, the money was to be shared between them, and the cardinals stopped paying extra money, meaning that the brothers in effect received only 150 ducats each per month, instead of the 500 that had been paid to their father.

The situation quickly grew even worse after Bessarion's death. For the first three months of 1473, the two brothers only received 690 ducats (instead of the correct 900). When Manuel left Rome in 1474, Pope Sixtus IV used Manuel's absence as an excuse to cut the full pension in half, paying Andreas 150 ducats a month rather than 300. This arrangement continued even during Manuel's brief return to the city in 1475. From the late 1470s onwards, the pension was cut back frequently. Though Andreas received 150 ducats in June 1478, he only received 104 in November and for several months after that on account of the "many wars" faced by the papacy. In 1488 and 1489, Andreas was paid 100 ducats each month, though the actual payment often fell below that. After the accession of Pope Alexander VI in August 1492, the pension was lowered to just 50 ducats a month.

Andreas's financial situation was not improved by the fact that he also had to support his retinue. Though some members of his father's household probably traveled with his sister Zoe to Moscow, those who remained in Rome, such as Demetrius Rhaoul Cavaces (who represented Andreas and Manuel at Zoe's wedding), Manuel Palaiologos (not the same person as his brother), George Pagumenos and Michael Aristoboulos, were probably part of Andreas's household. Through his later life, the condition of Andreas's home deteriorated, and he became increasingly unable to support his retinue. By the 1480s, the papacy had become the new patron of some of his presumed companions, such as Theodore Tzamblacon "of Constantinople", Catherine Zamplaconissa, Euphrasina Palaiologina, Thomasina Cantacuzene and several Greeks described as "de Morea", including a man called Constantine, and the two women Theodorina and Megalia.

During the time spent in Rome, the majority of his adult life, Andreas lived in a house on the Campo Marzio granted to him by Sixtus IV at the time of Zoe's marriage. His house was probably located next to the local Church of Sant'Andrea. During his time in Rome, Andreas married Caterina, a woman from the city. Seeking financial aid, Andreas traveled to Russia in 1480, visiting his sister Zoe (now called Sophia) to beg for money. Sophia would later complain that she had no jewels left as she had given them all to her brother. On his way back to Rome, Andreas and his companions stopped at Mantua, where they received lodging and food from the marquess (Federico I Gonzaga) after the Duke of Ferrara (Ercole I d'Este) had pointed out to the marquess that Andreas was distantly related to the Italian House of Malatesta and that he was in dire financial troubles.

=== Attempted expedition against the Ottomans ===
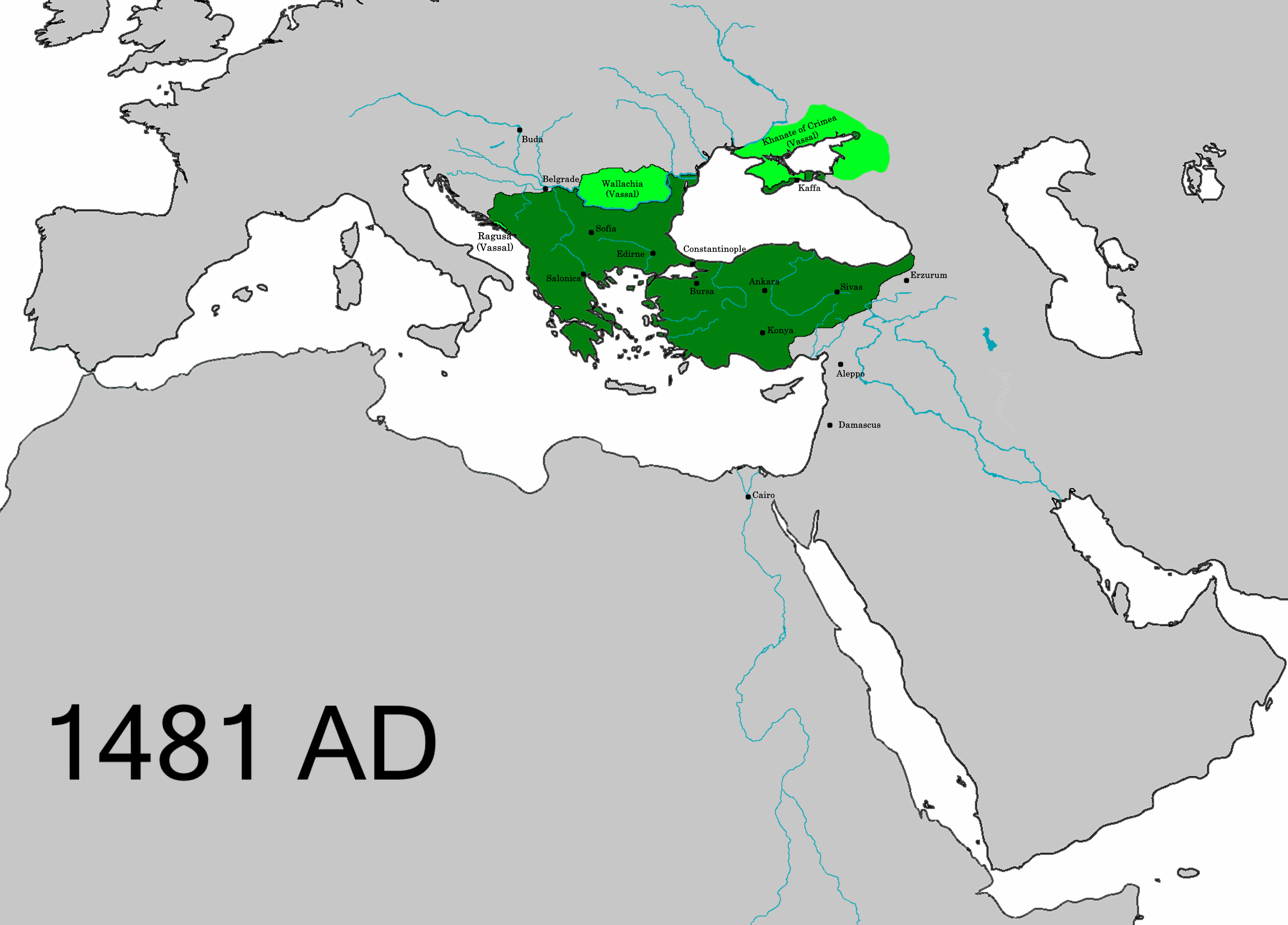
Map of the Ottoman Empire and its vassal states at the time of Andreas's invasion plans, in 1481

Like his father Thomas, Andreas actively engaged in schemes to restore the Byzantine Empire. Soon after returning from Russia, in the late summer of 1481, Andreas planned to organize an expedition against the Ottomans. At the time, Ottoman control of the Morea was shaky; in the recent Ottoman–Venetian War, many battles had taken place in the peninsula. Andreas traveled to southern Italy, the obvious rallying point for an attack through Greece, and was at Foggia in October with several of his close companions, including the aforementioned Manuel Palaiologos, George Pagumenos and Michael Aristoboulos. At Foggia, Andreas received financial aid from Ferdinand I, the King of Naples. To prepare, Andreas hired several mercenaries, including Krokodeilos Kladas, a Greek soldier who had led an unsuccessful revolt in the Morea against the Ottomans in 1480. Kladas would have been a valuable guide if Andreas had successfully landed in Greece. On 15 September 1481, Pope Sixtus IV wrote to bishops in Italy to do "everything in their power" to aid Andreas's crossing of the Adriatic Sea. Despite his plans and preparations, Andreas never sailed for Greece but instead spent October and November 1481 at Brindisi with his close companions and King Ferdinand I.

There were good reasons for canceling the expedition. Originally, 1481 had seemed like a good time to strike as the Ottomans had recently suffered a series of reverses. In August 1480, they had been repulsed with heavy losses in the siege of Rhodes, and Mehmed II's death on 3 May was followed by a civil war between his sons Cem and Bayezid over who was to seize power. Andreas may have hoped to take part in a counterattack against the Ottomans led by Ferdinand I (who was at the time being attacked by the Ottomans at Otranto). By October, the situation had grown unfavorable: Bayezid was well-established as Sultan and the major Christian realms of Western Europe were too disunited to join and wage war on the Ottomans. More critically, Andreas's efforts were underfunded. Historians, following the writings of contemporary writer Gherardi da Volterra, have alleged that Pope Sixtus IV gave Andreas 3000 ducats to finance the expedition. Though the sum was paid to Andreas in September 1481, there is no evidence to suggest it was for the war in Greece. English historian Jonathan Harris believes that it is more likely that the money was simply an advance payment for his travels in southern Italy since it did not cover any extra costs outside the regular expenditure of Andreas and his household.

Another reason why the expedition never set out might have been the reluctance of the Republic of Venice to aid Andreas. Andreas's small force would likely not have been capable of crossing the Adriatic Sea without aid from Venice, but Venice was reluctant to fight the Ottomans more or less alone. Furthermore, the Signoria (supreme governing body) of Venice had recently signed a treaty with the Ottomans and disapproved of any ongoing anti-Ottoman activities. Andreas did make at least one further attempt at recapturing the Morea, becoming involved in a 1485 plot to seize Monemvasia from the Venetians.

=== Travels and sale of the imperial title ===
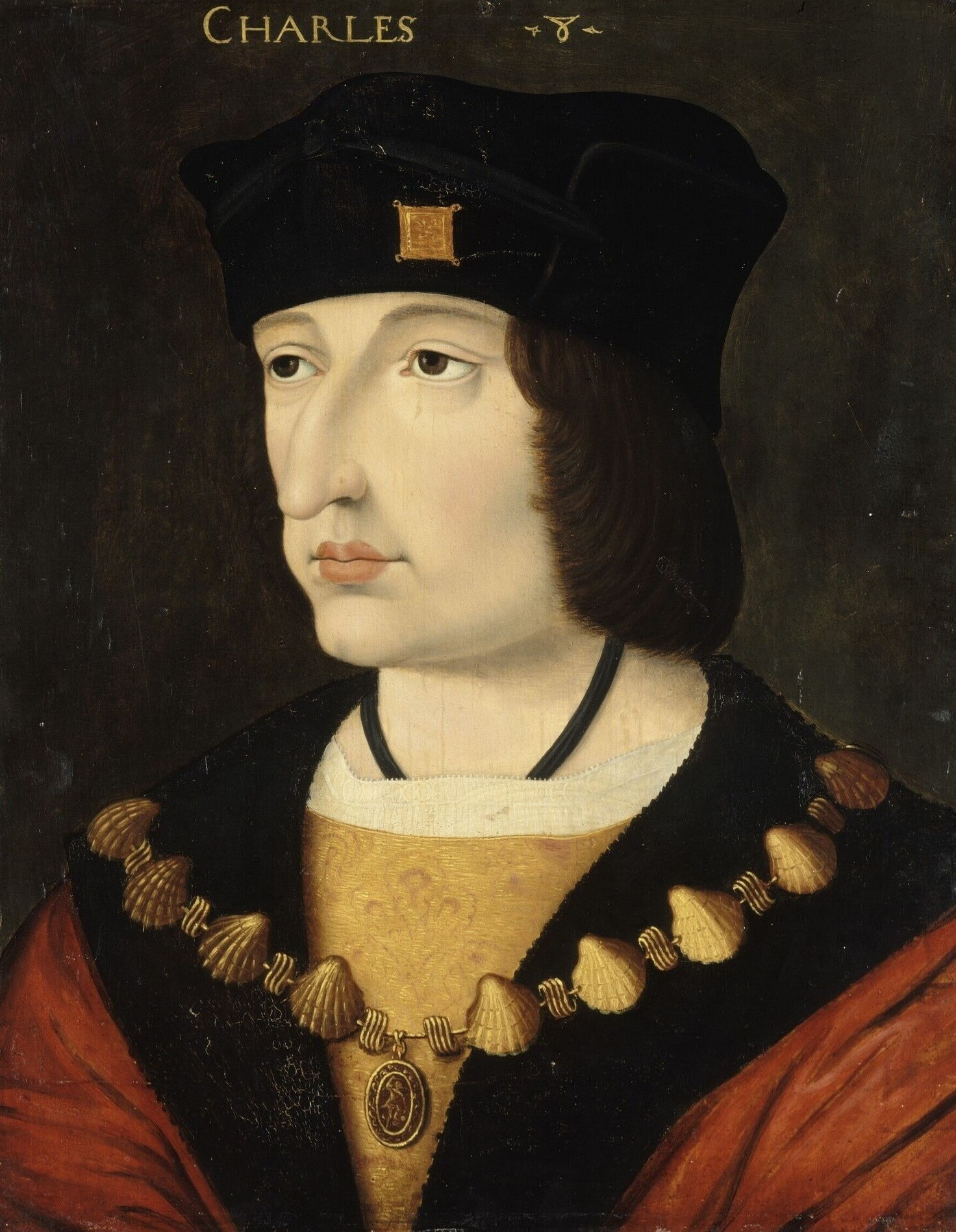
Contemporary painting of Charles VIII of France

Andreas left Rome to travel to Moscow once more in 1490, accompanied by Moscow's ambassadors to Rome, Greek brothers Demetrius and Manuel Rhalles. However, when Andreas returned to Moscow he was no longer welcomed, and he instead chose to travel to France, where he was generously received by King Charles VIII, who paid for all of his travel expenses after Andreas gifted him a white falcon. Andreas stayed with the king at Laval and Tours from October to December 1491 and received additional money, amounting to 350 livres, before he returned to Rome. According to chronicler Gherardi da Volterra, Andreas and Charles spent much time discussing the possibility of a crusade against the Ottomans. In 1492, Andreas was in England, where King Henry VII was not as hospitable as Charles VIII, instructing his treasurer, Lord Dynham, to pay Andreas with an amount he thought appropriate and then give him safe passage out of the country. Andreas's European tour in search for aid for his cause was similar to the one conducted by his grandfather, Emperor Manuel II Palaiologos, who traveled Europe from 1399 to 1402 in the hope of securing aid against the Ottomans.

In the 1490s, King Charles VIII of France was actively planning a crusade against the Ottomans, but he was also involved in a struggle to gain control of the Kingdom of Naples in southern Italy. The French Cardinal Raymond Peraudi was passionately devoted to Charles's crusading plans and was against him getting embroiled in Italian politics, believing that war against Naples would prove a fatal diversion from attacking the Ottomans. French soldiers were already marching into northern Italy on their way to Naples when Peraudi, hoping to divert them to the East before the conflict with Naples, began engineering a plan (apparently without the king's knowledge) to give Charles a formal claim on the Byzantine throne.

Negotiating with Andreas, Peraudi secured that, in return for Andreas abdicating his titles to the imperial thrones of Constantinople and Trebizond, and the Despotate of Serbia, Andreas would receive 4300 ducats annually (almost 360 ducats a month), out of which 2000 ducats would be paid immediately when the abdication was ratified. Additionally, Andreas was promised a personal guard of a hundred cavalrymen, maintained at Charles's expense, and was promised lands either in Italy or in some other place, which in addition to his pension would generate an annual income of 5000 ducats. Furthermore, Charles was to use his military and naval forces to recover the Despotate of the Morea for Andreas. In return for being granted his ancestral lands (once he had been restored in the Morea), Andreas's feudal tax to Charles would consist of one white saddle horse every year. Charles was also to use his influence with the pope to raise Andreas's papal pension to its original sum of 1800 ducats annually (150 monthly). The transfer of Andreas's titles was to be considered legal unless Charles rejected it before All Saints' Day the following year (1 November 1495).

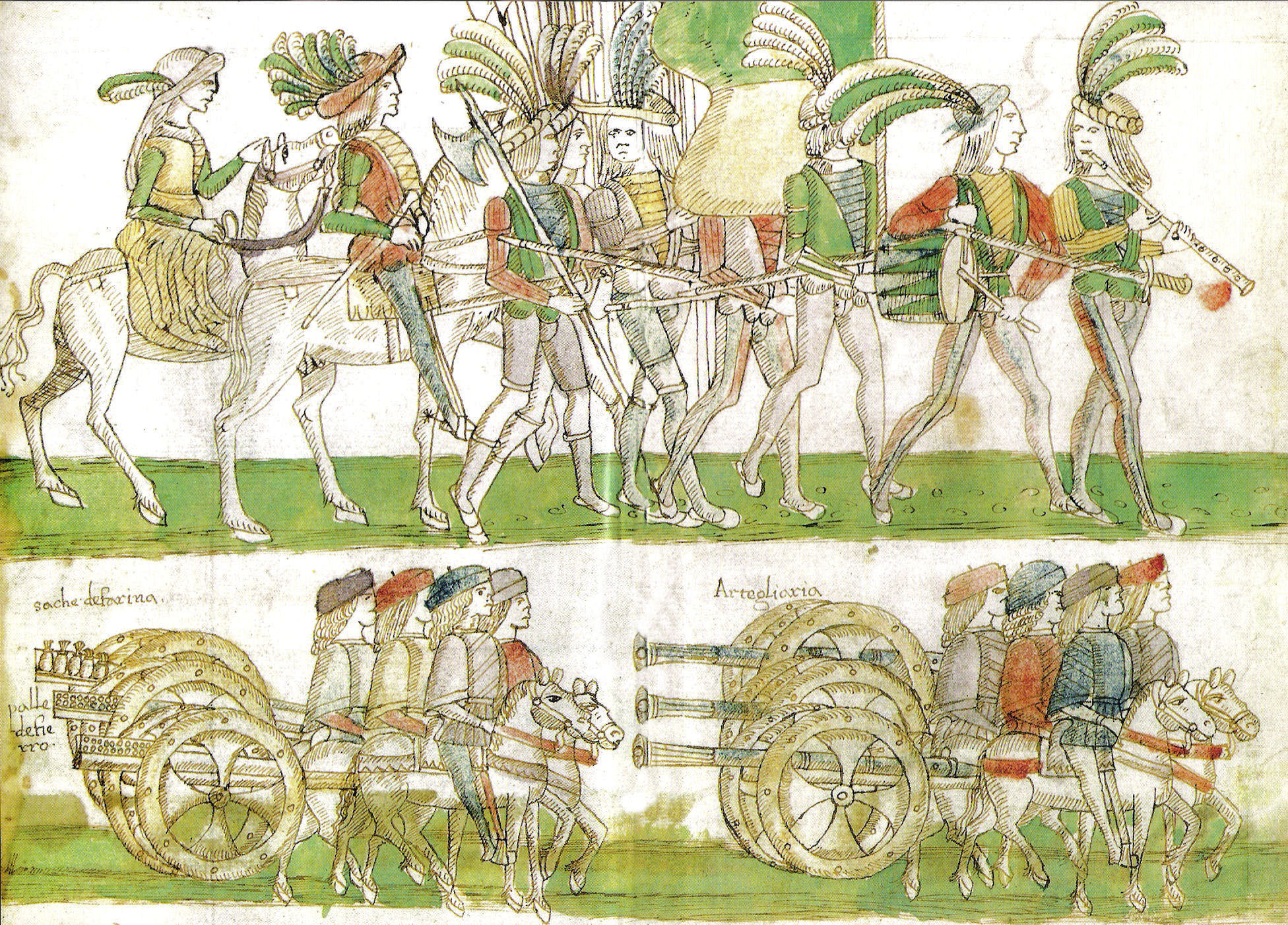
The French troops and artillery of Charles VIII entering Naples in 1495

Although most of what Andreas was to secure from the deal was financial, the agreement was not an irresponsible abdication solely for the sake of easing Andreas's financial situation. Andreas explicitly kept for himself the title of Despot of the Morea and made Charles promise to grant Andreas the Morea if he were to be victorious against the Ottomans. In essence, Andreas hoped to use Charles as a dominant champion against the Ottomans, just as he had desired to use Ferdinand of Naples thirteen years earlier.

The documents of Andreas's abdication were prepared by Francesco de Schracten of Florence, a pontifical and imperial notary, and Camillo Beninbene, (Note: His name can also be found spelled as Benembene, Beneimbene, or Benimbene.) also a notary and a doctor of canon and civil law, on 6 November 1494 in the Church of San Pietro in Montorio, and in addition to Andreas and Peraudi, the affair was witnessed by five clergymen. Though Charles may still have been unaware of being granted the titles in November, Pope Alexander VI was probably very aware since he provided for Andreas, and Peraudi was a cardinal. The plan was perfect for Alexander VI, who, like Peraudi, hoped that the French armies marching through Italy were intended to be used against the Ottomans in defense of Christendom and not against Naples. If the Holy Roman Emperor, Maximilian I, was to object to the sudden presence of another emperor in Western Europe, the pope could simply point out that Andreas's abdication had not been papally sanctioned and that those who oversaw the affair had acted improperly on their own initiative. Rumors, and eventually news, of the event did eventually reach Maximilian I, who complained that for the good of Christianity, only the Holy Roman Emperor should hold the imperial title.

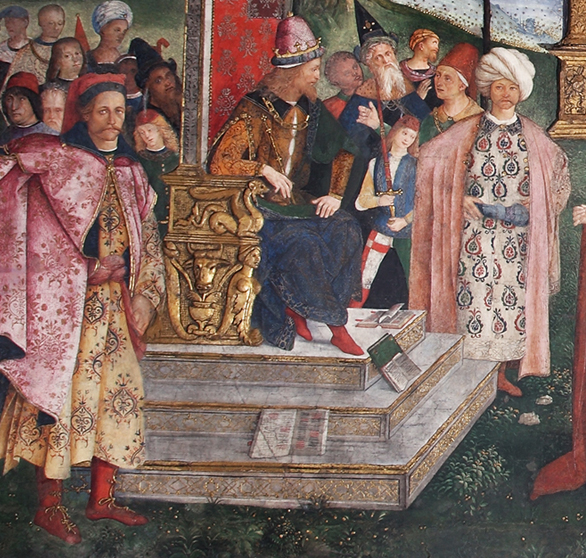
Detail Pinturicchio's St Catherine's Disputation (1491) in the Hall of the Saints in the Borgia Apartments, Vatican Palace. The turbaned figure to the right is Cem Sultan and the figure in the foreground to the left is probably Andreas.

Charles eventually accepted the conditions of Andreas's abdications but did not divert from Naples. Though he considered declaring a crusade already while staying at Asti in northern Italy, he decided that he would only venture eastwards after he had conquered Naples, according to Charles himself mainly due to the increased number of attack plans possible if Naples was under his control. Charles VIII's Italian campaign caused some concern in Constantinople, and Bayezid began building up his defenses, constructing new ships and artillery and redirecting his military forces to defensive positions throughout Greece and the lands surrounding Constantinople.

Charles's efforts were delayed as the king became embroiled in a conflict with the papacy and states throughout Italy. Still, on 27 January 1495, he secured possession of Cem Sultan, Bayezid's brother and a rival claimant to the Ottoman throne, formerly in papal captivity. On 22 February, Charles triumphantly entered Naples. Modern historians are divided on whether Charles was crowned as Emperor of Constantinople at Naples. According to Kenneth Setton, writing in 1978, Pope Alexander VI offered Charles to personally crown him as emperor, but Charles refused, preferring to conquer the territories of the former eastern empire before formally being crowned emperor. According to Liviu Pilat and Ovidiu Cristea, writing in 2017, Charles had himself crowned as both Emperor of Constantinople and King of Jerusalem at Naples.

Three days after entering Naples, Charles faced a significant loss with the death of Cem Sultan. The crusading plans had often revolved around the part Cem was expected to play. Though his army was still intact, Cem's death, combined with a league being formed against Charles VIII, brought with it a gradual abandonment of the crusading plans.

Hopes for a French invasion of the Ottoman Empire ended when Charles died in 1498. In the meantime, Charles took care to support "our great friend" (Latin: magnus amicus noster) Andreas, and on 14 May 1495 awarded him an annual pension of 1200 ducats. Andreas once more claimed his imperial titles after 1498. Since the conditions of his abdication to Charles (notably gaining the Morea) had never been fulfilled, the abdication could be seen as having been rendered invalid. Church officials recognized the return of the titles to Andreas, with post-1498 records of people present at church services according him not only the title despotus Peloponensis ('despot of the Peloponnese'), but also Imperator Grecorum ('Emperor of the Greeks') or Imperator Constantinopolitanus.

The French kings after Charles VIII – Louis XII, Francis I, Henry II and Francis II – also continued to use imperial titles and honors. Like his predecessor Charles VIII, Louis XII also invaded Italy, as part of the Second Italian War (1499–1504), and during this time presented himself as a would-be crusader ostensibly headed for Constantinople and Jerusalem. The effigy of Louis XII on his grave bears an imperial crown, rather than a royal one. Francis I publicly stressed his claim to be the Emperor of Constantinople as late as 1532. Not until Charles IX in 1566 did the imperial claim come to an eventual end through the rules of extinctive prescription as a direct result of desuetude, or lack of use. Charles IX wrote that the imperial Byzantine title "is not more eminent than that of a king, which sounds better and sweeter".

=== Later life and death ===
The failure of the crusade plans left Andreas once more short of money. Bishop Jacques Volaterranus wrote of the poor spectacle Andreas and his entourage made at Rome, covered in rags rather than the purple and silk vestments he had formerly always worn. Nevertheless, Andreas remained an influential figure in Rome until his death. He held a prominent position in Pope Alexander VI's close circle, at one point being part of the pope's mounted honor guard, escorting distinguished guests visiting the city. On 11 March 1501, Andreas prominently partook in the ceremonial entry of an ambassador from Lithuania into the city. He continued to insist on his prominence, at one point coming into conflict with Cesare Borgia, illegitimate son of Alexander VI, because of it. Andreas also met with many other claimants to formerly Byzantine territories in his later years, such as Carlo III Tocco (claimant Despot of Epirus) and Constantine Arianiti (claimant "Prince of Macedonia").

Andreas died poor in Rome at some point in June 1502. In his will, written on 7 April that same year, he once more gave away his claim to the imperial title, this time to Ferdinand II of Aragon and Isabella I of Castile, designating them and their successors as his universal heirs. The choice to grant the title to the Spaniards was probably made due to the recent Spanish successes in conquering Granada (1492) and Cephalonia (1500). Appealing to the Spanish monarchs through mentioning the traditional titles held by the Aragonese crown in Greece (Duke of Athens and Duke of Neopatras), Andreas hoped that the Spaniards would launch a crusade from their holdings in Apulia, Calabria and Sicily, conquering the Peloponnese before moving on to Thrace and Constantinople. Neither Ferdinand nor Isabella, nor any succeeding monarch of Spain, ever used the title. Andreas's widow Caterina was given 104 ducats by Pope Alexander VI to pay the costs of his funeral. He was buried with honor in St. Peter's Basilica, next to his father Thomas. Since Andreas and Thomas were buried in Rome, their graves survived the destruction and removal of the tombs of the Palaiologan emperors in Constantinople during the early years of Ottoman rule, but modern efforts to locate their graves within the Basilica have not succeeded.

== Possible descendants ==
Barring the claims of the French kings, considered invalid by Andreas, and the claims or later impostor pretenders and forgers, Andreas was the last claimant to the position of Byzantine emperor. He is commonly believed not to have left any descendants. According to Donald Nicol in The Immortal Emperor (1992), it is possible that Constantine Palaiologos, who was employed in the Papal Guard as a commander, was a son of Andreas. Constantine is recorded to have died in 1508, just six years after Andreas. Russian sources accord Andreas a daughter by the name Maria Palaiologina, unmentioned in Western sources, who was married off to the Russian noble Vasily Mikhailovich, Prince of Vereya, by her aunt (Andreas's sister) Sophia. A 1487 Roman epitaph honors a "Lucretiae Andreae Paleologi filiae" ("Lucretia, daughter of Andreas Palaiologos"), who died on 2 September 1487, but since she is described as having died at the age of 49, she cannot have been the daughter of the would-be despot and emperor Andreas Palaiologos.

On 17 July 1499, Ludovico Sforza, the Duke of Milan, reported that he had sent "Don Fernando, son of the Despot of the Morea, nephew of the lord Constantine [Arianiti, governor of Montferrat], to the Turk with five horses", possibly a diplomatic or espionage mission. This Fernando might have been another son of Andreas, and though Fernando actually adopted the title Despot of the Morea after Andreas's death, he appears to have made relatively little impact on history, either because he was unwilling to play a prominent role or because he might have been illegitimate, which would have hampered him. Constantine Arianiti, genealogically unconnected to Andreas, also claimed the title of Despot of the Morea a few months after Andreas's death. One of Andreas's successors as claimant to the position of Despot of the Morea raised problems of protocol when he in 1518 invited Pope Leo X to become the godparent of his son Giovanni Martino Leonardo and also invited ten cardinals to the baptism.

Theodore Paleologus, who lived in Cornwall in the 17th century and claimed descent from Thomas Palaiologos through an otherwise unattested son called John, might be a descendant of Andreas instead, but his lineage is uncertain. Theodore's last recorded descendant was Godscall Paleologue, who disappeared from historical records in the late 17th century. In the late 16th century, a theologian by the name Jacob Palaeologus, originally from Chios, became a Dominican friar in Rome. Jacob travelled across Europe, boasting of his descent and claiming to be a grandson of Andreas Palaiologos, through a supposed son called Theodore. Jacob's increasingly heterodox views on Christianity eventually brought him into conflict with the Roman church; he was burnt as a heretic in 1585. Jacob had at least three children, the daughter Despina, the son Theodore, and at least another child whose name is unknown, though little is known of most of them. Jacob's son Theodore lived in Prague in 1603.

== Legacy and analysis ==
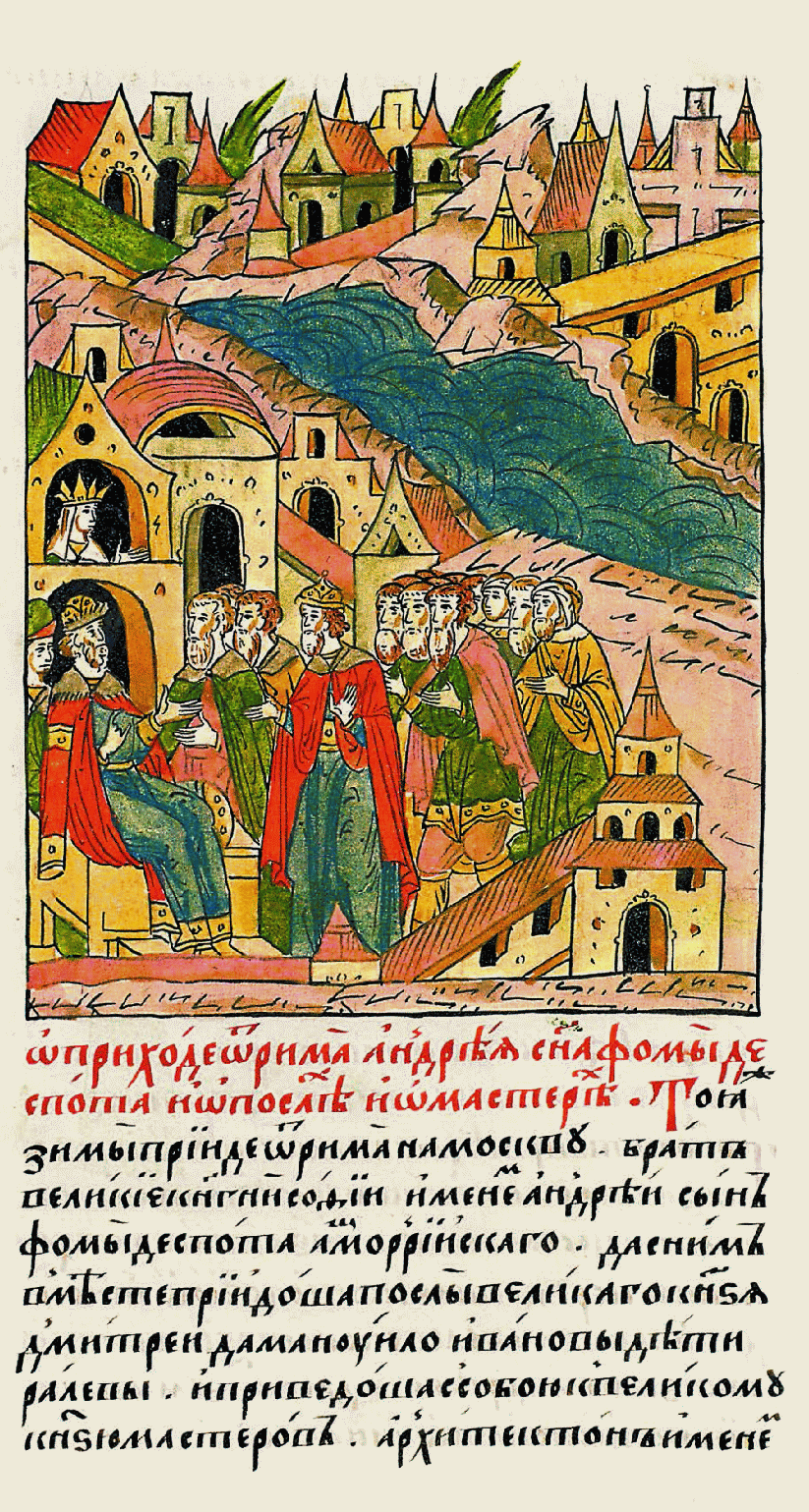
16th-century depiction in a Russian chronicle of Andreas's visit to his sister. Andreas is the standing crowned figure in the center.

Later historians have overwhelmingly seen Andreas in a negative light. Scottish historian George Finlay wrote in 1877 of the fate of Andreas that it "hardly merits the attention of history, were it not that mankind has a morbid curiosity concerning the fortunes of the most worthless princes". According to Jonathan Harris, who in 1995 offered a more redeeming view of Andreas, he is typically characterized as "an immoral and extravagant playboy who squandered his generous papal pension on loose living and eventually died in poverty". Contrary to his typical portrayal, which he considered "by no means entirely fair", Harris believed that it would be wrong to dismiss Andreas as a footnote in history.

Andreas's reputation might have been harmed by the actions of his father Thomas, whose warring with his brother Demetrios (Andreas's uncle) allowed the Ottomans to conquer the Morea. The feud between his father and uncle had nothing to do with Andreas, who was just seven years old at the time he and his family fled into exile. The financial situation of the Palaiologoi in the 1470s to 1490s must have been considered precarious for Andreas to sell his titular claims and for Manuel to travel Europe in hopes of employment and eventually reach the Ottomans in Constantinople. Only a single contemporary author and an author of the generation following the two brothers placed the blame for their financial hardships on Andreas. Writing in 1538, Theodore Spandounes claimed that Andreas's brother Manuel was better in every possible way and, writing in 1481, Gherardi da Volterra stated that Andreas's financial situation was due to his excessive indulging in "lovemaking and pleasures". This negative assessment was echoed by many modern historians but Harris believes it has minimal basis.

To further paint Andreas negatively, virtually every modern account of his life mentions his 1479 marriage to Caterina, who is often cast in a particularly negative light. Historian Steven Runciman famously described her as "a lady from the streets of Rome" and she is typically identified as a prostitute. In addition to his financial ruin, marrying a prostitute is another point often used against Andreas. She is known from only a single primary source, the Introitus et Exitus books of the Apostolic Camera, which mentions only her first name, meaning that her profession and social standing are unknown. Not even the contemporary critics of Andreas, da Volterra and Spandounes, mention her. The earliest reference to Caterina's "bad character" is from the works of the 17th-century Byzantinist Charles du Fresne, Sieur du Cange, meaning that tales of Caterina have to be considered unsubstantiated oral tradition. The idea forwarded by Byzantinist Dionysios Zakythinos in his 1932 work Le despotat grec de Morée (1262–1460) that Andreas's marriage to the "prostitute" Caterina was the cause of the papacy cutting back his pension is demonstrably false; Pope Sixtus IV even paid Andreas two years' worth of his pension in advance in 1479, presumably to cover the expenses of Andreas's journey to Russia.

Although it is possible that Andreas did live an extravagant life, the more likely root cause for his poverty is the constant reductions to the pension paid to him by the papacy. Though the popes had been generous to the Palaiologoi on the face of it, providing housing and money, they were not as plentiful as some historians have claimed. The popes themselves are partly responsible for propagating this idea. For instance, Sixtus IV recorded his generosity towards the Palaiologoi in the frescoes of the Ospedale di Santo Spirito in Sassia. One of the murals depicts Sixtus IV with a grateful Andreas kneeling at his feet. Andreas did not, as usually stated, waste enormous sums of papal money; the monthly 300 ducat pension provided initially to his father Thomas had shrunken to only 50 ducats by 1492.

Historians have mostly discarded the 1481 expedition against the Ottomans as more evidence of his incompetence. Runciman went so far as to claim that Andreas "squandered" the money donated by the pope and used it for "other purposes". Though the expedition never happened, there is no reason to believe that Andreas was not serious about it. The fact that Andreas actually traveled to Brindisi suggests that he did intend to lead an expedition to restore the empire. Despite the campaign failing to materialize, the preparations conducted do demonstrate that Andreas did not spend his time in Rome solely in the pursuit of pleasure.

Although he did not die wealthy, a common assertion is that Andreas died without any money at all. This idea derives from the fact that Andreas's widow, Caterina, was given money by Pope Alexander VI to pay for the funeral. However, such donations were not rare or necessarily an indication of poverty. The 1487 funeral of another royal exile, Queen Charlotte of Cyprus, was also paid for by the papacy, and there are no records of her being described as extravagant or impoverished. Andreas was buried with honor in the St. Peter's Basilica, suggesting that he had at least retained some individual status.

Harris considered the exile of Andreas in Rome as the continuation, and ultimate failure, of a policy pursued by the Palaiologoi for over a century. As the Palaiologan emperors had done before them, both Thomas and Andreas continued to cling to the ultimately unsuccessful plan of securing papal aid for a grand campaign of reconquest and restoration. Ultimately, Andreas's life was not a great success, and his dreams of restoring the Byzantine Empire were dashed by continually having to raise funds to support himself and his household. His difficult situation was not his fault, and though the degradation of papal support is the most direct cause for his hardships, the failure ultimately was in the Palaiologan policy of looking to the West for aid itself. The emperors had adopted this policy since their situation in the 14th and 15th centuries offered few other options. They clung to it even though little aid ever arrived, despite many promises. The fact that the West was ultimately powerless to aid Byzantium was a factor in the empire's downfall and ensured that Andreas never returned to his homeland.

== See also ==
- Succession to the Byzantine Empire

== Notes ==
Andreas Palaiologos Palaiologos dynasty Born: 17 January 1453 Died: June 1502
Titles in pretence
Preceded by Constantine XI Palaiologos	— TITULAR — Emperor of Constantinople; 1483–1494; 1498–1502	Succeeded by Charles VIII of France
Preceded by Charles VIII of France	— TITULAR — Emperor of Constantinople; 1483–1494; 1498–1502	Title fell into disuse¹
Preceded by Thomas Palaiologos	— TITULAR — Despot of the Morea; 1465–1502	Succeeded by Fernando Palaiologos and Constantine Arianiti (both self-proclaimed)
Notes and references
1. Willed to Ferdinand II of Aragon and Isabella I of Castile. Neither Ferdinand nor Isabella, nor any of their successors, ever used the title.
