= The Hall of the Saints (Pinturicchio) =

Room in the Borgia Apartment of the Vatican Palace

Hall of the Saints
- Sala dei Santi
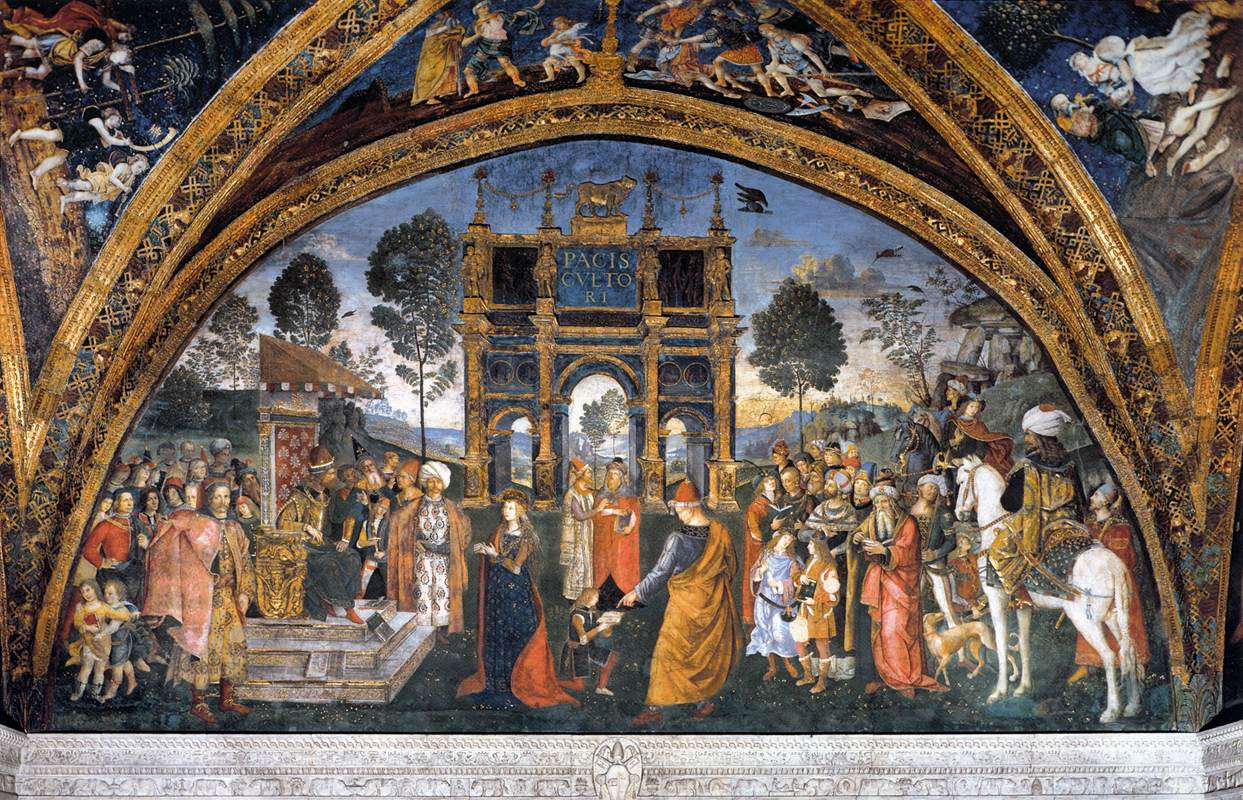
- Artist: Pinturicchio
- Year: 1491-1494
- Medium: fresco
- Location: Vatican Palace

The Hall of the Saints or the Sala dei Santi is a room in the Borgia Apartment of the Vatican Palace, frescoed by the Italian Renaissance artist, Pinturicchio. It dates to 1491–1494 and was commissioned by Pope Alexander VI. The frescoes depict scenes from the lives of the saints. The ceiling fresco, which depicts myths related to the ancient Egyptian gods Osiris and Isis, has been the subject of much scholarly attention. The iconographic program reflects the humanistic interests of Alexander VI and was likely designed by his secretary, Giovanni Annio of Viterbo.

== History ==
Throughout the fifteenth and early sixteenth century, Pinturicchio was an artist who was often commissioned by the church members among the papal court. After Alexander VI had been crowned as Pope, he commissioned a group of frescoes from Pinturicchio. He had appointed Giovanni Annio of Viterbo as the theologian to the Papal Court, which led to Annio advising on the creation of a mythological genealogy for Pope Alexander VI. The compositions depicting him as tracing his ancestry back to Ancient Egyptian forebrears. Using his position as Pope, Alexander VI wanted Pinturicchio's frescoes to help establish his legitimacy of claims in having Egyptian ancestry.

== Borgia Apartments ==
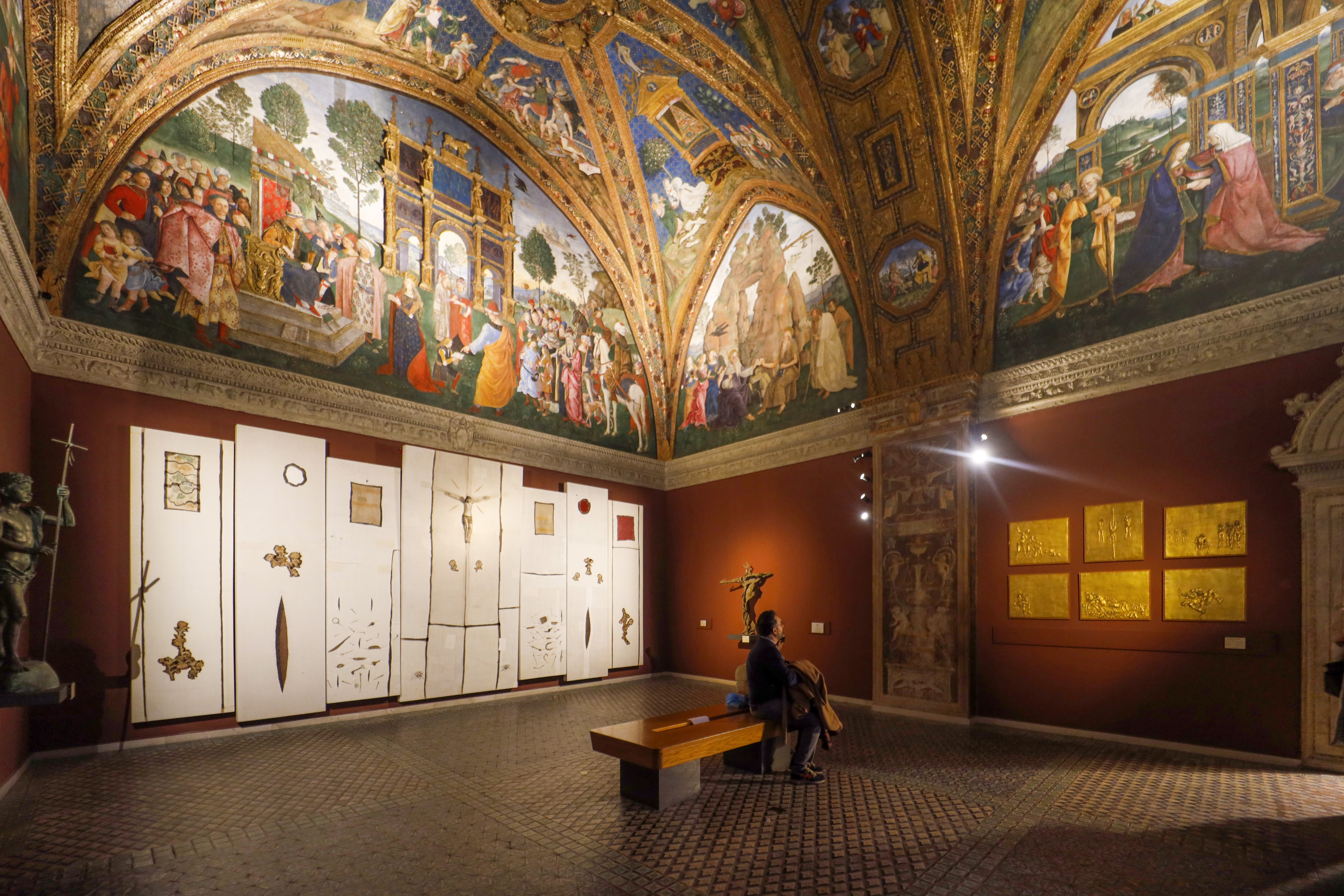
Hall of Saints, Borgia Apartment, Vatican Palace

Among the five rooms of the Borgia Apartments, frescos cover the upper half of the walls. Although, for about four centuries after the frescos were created, they were forgotten and sealed until the 19th century. Located in the fourth room, there’s a fresco of the Visitation that contains the seven saints: Anthony, Barbara, Catherine, Elizabeth, Paul, Sebastian, and Susanna. The Hall of Saints are located with the Visitation fresco in the fourth room.

The first room features the prophets from the Old Testament and twelve sibyls holding scrolls about the coming of Christ. The second room having the twelve apostles and prophets holding inscribed scrolls with prophecies of the Savior. Inside the third room, are the seven Liberal Arts represented as women. The fifth room has scenes of the Annunciation, Nativity, Adoration of the Magi, Resurrection, Ascension, Pentecost, and Assumption of the Virgin Mary, all illustrations related to the lives of the Christ and the Virgin Mary.

== The Hall of Saints Frescoes ==
The upper walls of the Hall of Saints are decorated with frescoes that illustrates the lives of people selected by Pope Alexander VI as patron saints. Also, several of the other frescos show illustrations of Christ and Egyptian Gods. This room served as a possible throne room for Pope Alexander VI as the second Borgia pope, reigning Rodrigo Borgia from 1493–1503.

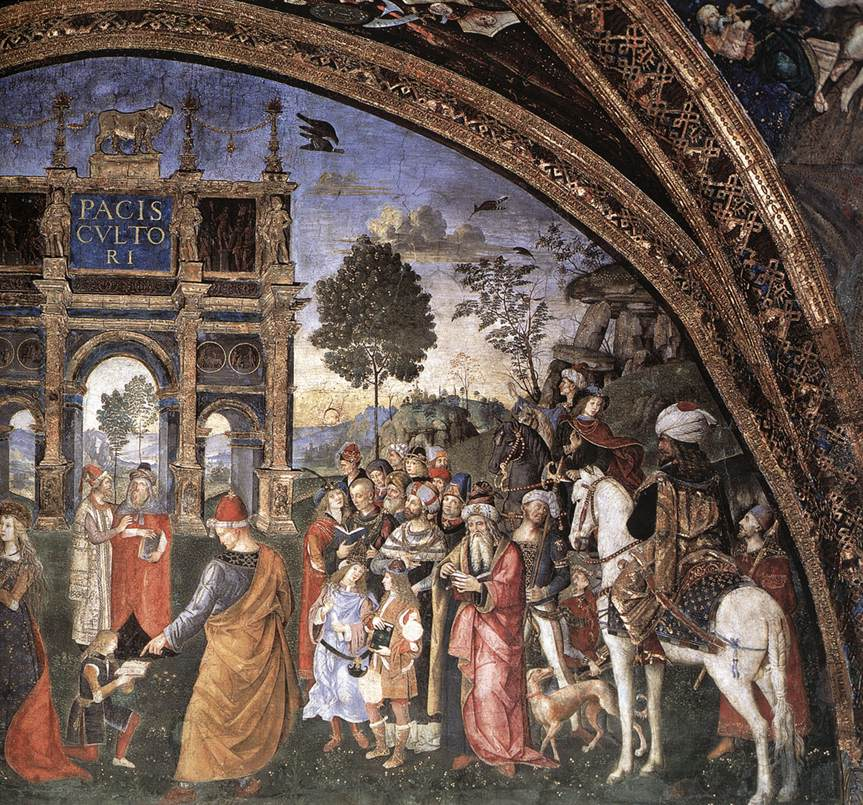
Disputa di Santa Caterina

A courtier would have seen the Pope's back against the Saint Catherine fresco, which depicts her debating against Maxentius and his scholars about the Incarnation and Passion of Christ.

Scenes inspired by ancient Egyptian myths or in pagan culture are found inside the Hall of Saints, especially centered around the bull. Alexander VI shared his family's great fondness for the bull as a symbol, including imagery of the animal in a variety of media and scales throughout the Borgia Apartments.

=== Ceiling Fresco ===
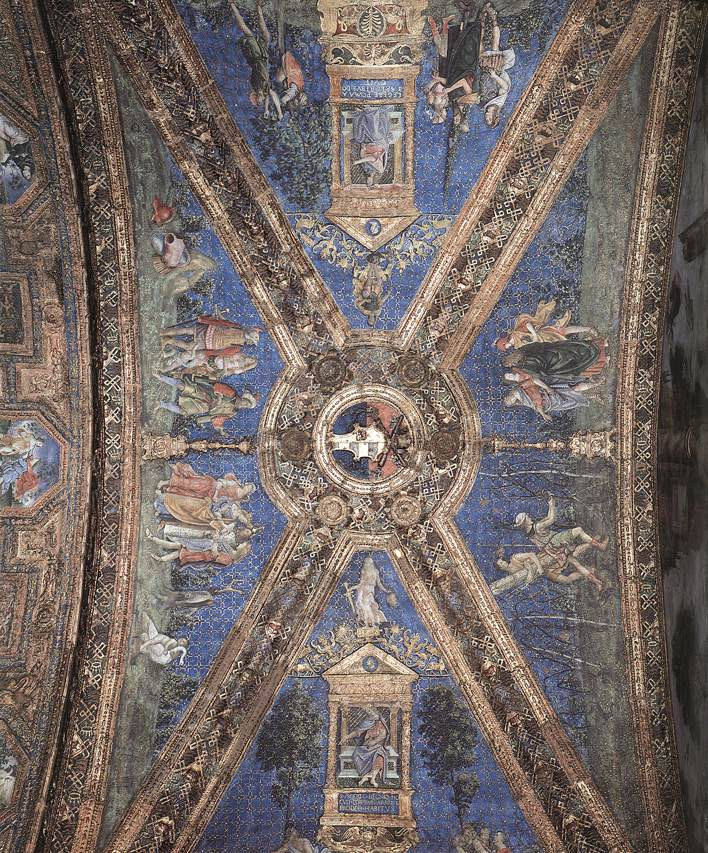
Pinturicchio, Story of Isis, Osiris, and Apis, Fresco, Borgia Apartment, Vatican palace, 1492-1494

Most of the Egyptian content in the Hall of the Saints is on the ceiling, where there are images of the Egyptian gods Osiris, Isis, and Apis. It wasn’t a coincidence that the figures in the ceiling fresco resembles the Egyptian myth of Isis and Osiris, Borgias family’s symbol with the bull, and the glorification of the Egyptians’ worship.

In the northern vault, the narrative of Osiris and Isis begins, depicting them as the “cultivators of peace” and mankind’s benefactors. In the south vault, there are four scenes which depict the assassination and dismemberment of Osiris by his brother Typhon, Christ's entombment, Osiris’ resurrection as Apis, and Apis prophesying the triumph of Christ.

==== Assassination of Osiris ====
During the era of lawless brutality, Osiris had brought peace to the nations with an army that stayed away from military arts and taught them agriculture instead; Osiris set aside his royal vestments and taught the use of a plough to the Egyptians, as well as the cultivation of vines and fruit. He was then married to Isis. When Typhon had killed Osiris, he mutilated the body parts and spread them across the earth.

===== Christ’s Entombment =====
Isis gathered Osiris's scattered limbs and fused them together as a part of his regeneration rite. Isis was able to find Osiris’ limbs, recompose the body and have a burial underneath a pyramid. However, details of Isis's victory over Typhon weren’t shown, but there are details of Typhon’s mutilated torso forcing him to acknowledge Osiris as the Apis.^{[needs clarification]}

====== Osiris’s Resurrection ======
Osiris, resurrected with the features of an ox, is celebrated by an entourage of Egyptians. In a celebration for Osiris‘ ascendancy as Apis, he was elevated in honor and his entourage moved him from the surrounding people.^{[needs clarification]} With his new features as Apis, he restarted as Apis-Osiris in an exercise of true religion.^{[needs clarification]}

====== Apis Prophesies the Triumph of Christ ======
The reason for the Egyptians celebration was because they considered the bull, Apis, an image of a resurrected god.^{[needs clarification]} The Borgia family’s insignia of a bull serves as a symbol of the Christian Church in its triumph. The connection of these two types of symbols signify that they were raised in triumphal honor, one as the distant ancestor of the other stressed by the procession of the Apis.

== Iconography and Analysis ==
These ancient Egyptian gods are honored by the frescos after about a millennium of being neglected, but they do return as subordinates. They’re now to be seen as ‘hieroglyphic emblems’ and forerunners of the virtues and authority of the Borgia pope. This idea was brought upon the inspiration of Giovanni Annio of Viterbo’s studies. There were arches placed around the frescos, used to signify the victory the church had over the East. The Saint Catherine fresco had been shifted from the left to the center to avoid any distractions in the alignment of the pope.

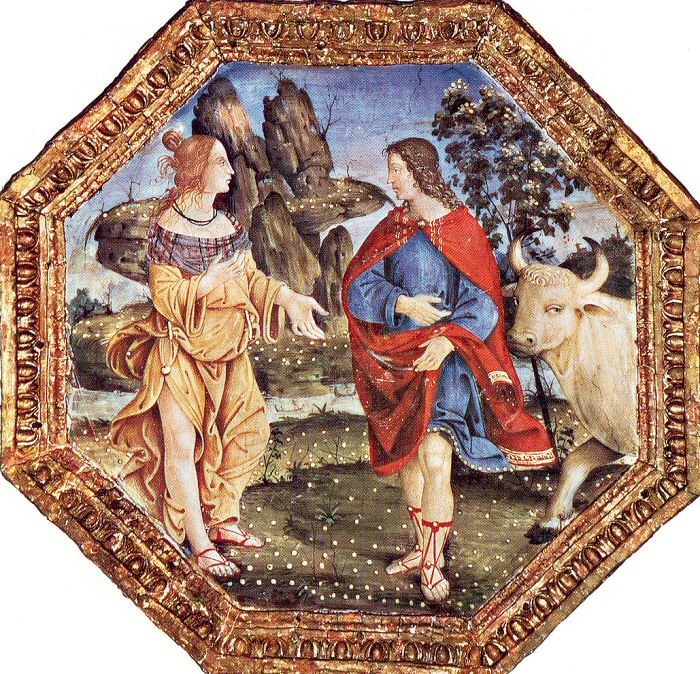

In addition of a statue of Apis, the inscription "To the cultivator of peace," references Apis, Alexander VI, and Christ as equals. This inscription further serves as a way to claim legitimacy to what Pope Alexander VI by stating that having supreme spiritual power mediates between earth and heaven.^{[needs clarification]} These frescos provided a visual proclamation about the aspirations and virtues of Pope Alexander VI and the Borgia Family. They were made to propagandize Pope Alexander VI, who wanted to show his divine sanction as the head of the church. Alexander VI also desired to re-create the atmosphere of his life as a wealthy cardinal in the papal court, which he had become accustomed to.

The illustration of the myth of Osiris and Apis provided both a historical and mythical justification for the Borgia family to claim as their ‘ancestral’ right to rule Italy, because of their ‘Egyptian’ ancestors. In Giovanni Annio of Viterbo's works of Diodorus Siculus, he talks about Isis and Osiris establishing colonies in the Mediterranean Sea, which he connects to the Borgia family's divine Egyptian ancestry.

== Gallery ==
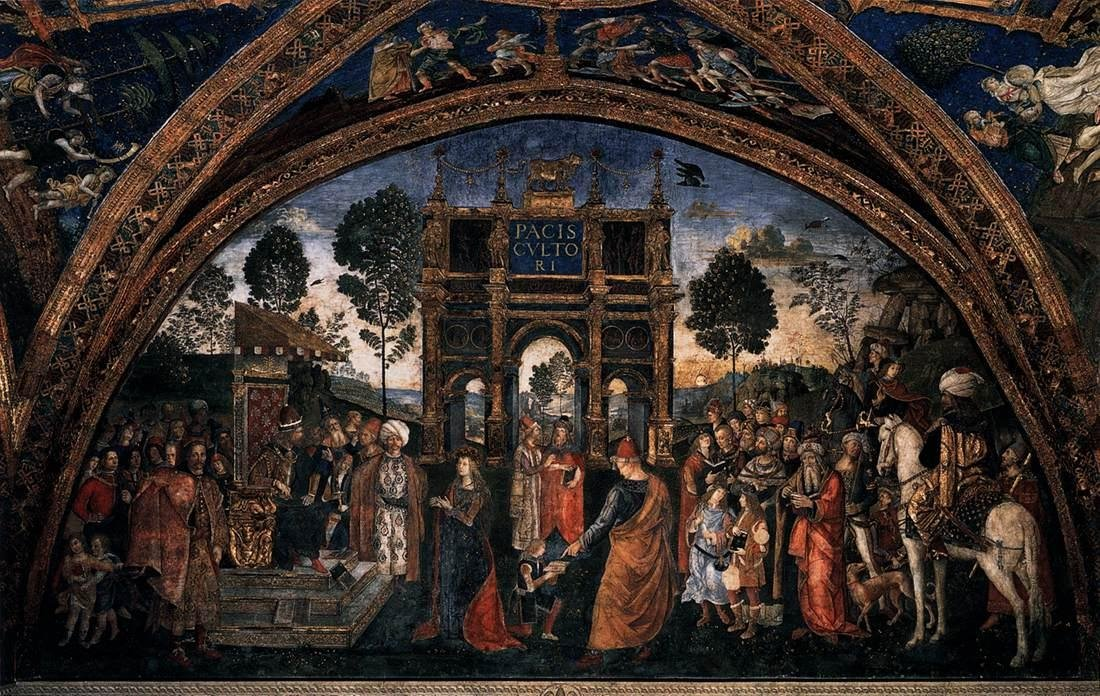

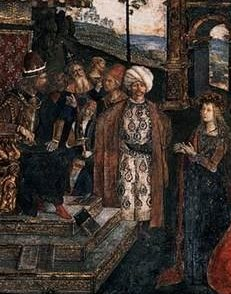

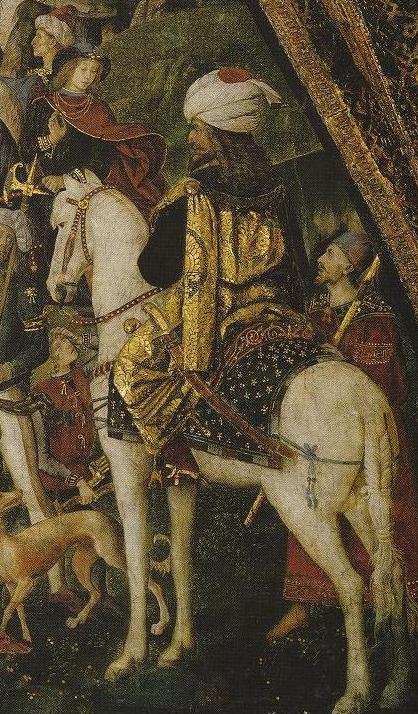

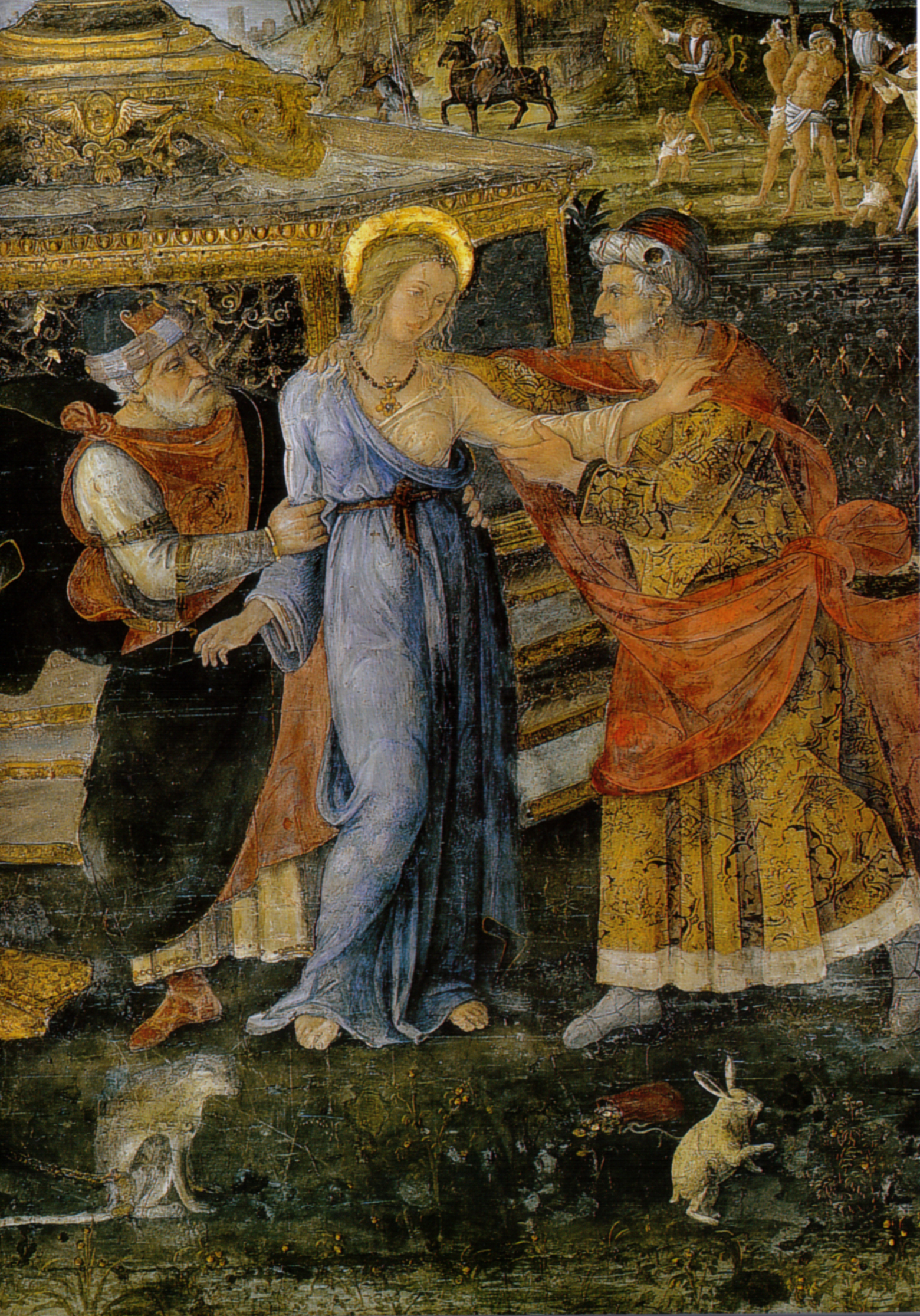

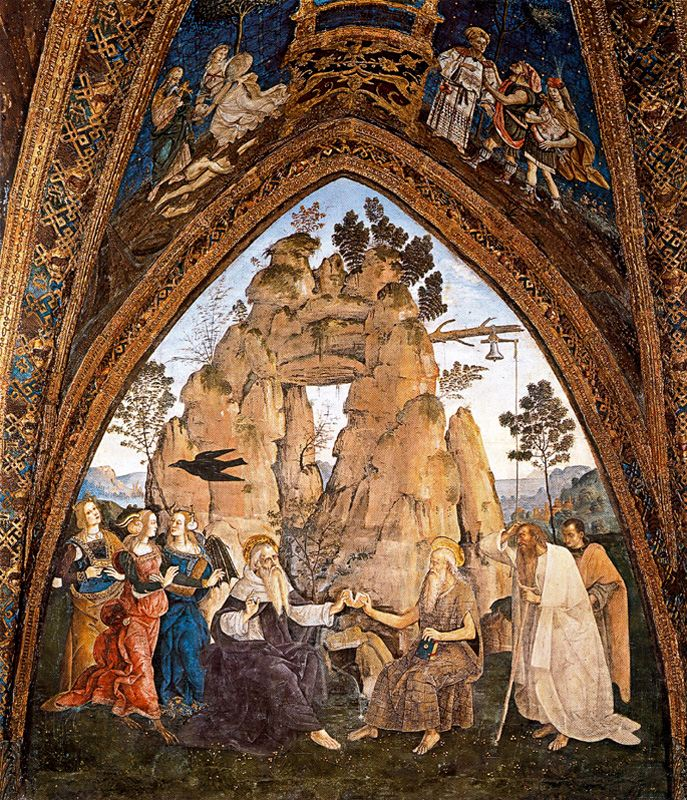

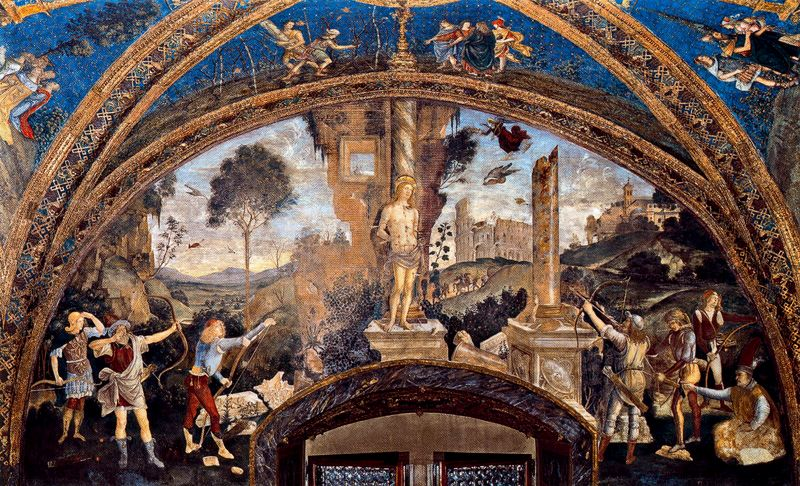

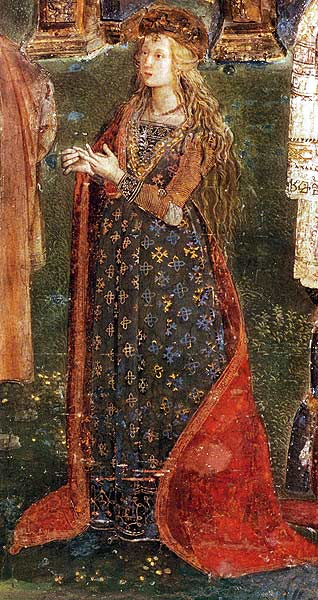
