= Maria Palaiologina (Princess of Vereya) =

Alleged daughter of Andreas Palaiologos (died 1505)

- Full name: Maria Andreyevna Palaiologina
- Died: 1505; Lithuania
- Noble family: Palaiologos
- Spouse: Vasily Mikhailovich
- Father: Andreas Palaiologos

Maria Palaiologina (Greek: Μαρία Παλαιολογίνα; died 1505) was, according to Russian sources, a daughter of Andreas Palaiologos and the niece of Sophia Palaiologina, the grand princess of Moscow by marriage to Ivan III of Russia.

Maria is only mentioned in Russian chronicles and is thus of unverified historicity; the lack of recorded children of Andreas in western sources has often been seen as evidence that he was childless. According to the chronicles, Maria married the Russian noble Vasily Mikhailovich, the prince of Vereya, in approximately 1480, but the two escaped into exile to Lithuania in 1483 due to an incident involving the jewels of Maria of Tver, the former grand princess of Moscow.

== History ==
=== Background ===
Maria Palaiologina is described in Russian sources, for instance the near-contemporary Sofia Chronicle, as a daughter of Andreas Palaiologos, otherwise commonly believed by modern historians not to have left any descendants. Andreas Palaiologos was the son of Thomas Palaiologos and the nephew of Constantine XI Palaiologos, the final Byzantine emperor. After the fall of the Byzantine Empire in 1453 and Thomas' lands in the Despotate of the Morea in 1460, Thomas and his family escaped into exile. Andreas lived in Rome, provided for by the papacy, from 1465 to his death in 1502, and claimed to be the rightful Byzantine emperor from 1483 onwards.

According to Russian sources, Maria was married off to the Russian noble Vasily Mikhailovich, Prince of Vereya, by her aunt (Andreas' sister) Sophia Palaiologina in around 1480, after Andreas' visit to Russia in 1480. Sophia was one of the most powerful people in Russia through her marriage to Grand Prince Ivan III of Moscow. Maria is not mentioned in any Western European sources. Claims of her existence were first forwarded in western scholarship by the Polish historian and genealogist Adam Boniecki in 1887 and then by the French historian and genealogist Nicolas de Baumgarten in 1934, citing the older Russian chronicles. Recognition of Maria's historicity has varied since then. In his 1961 biography of Ivan III, the British historian John Lister Illingworth Fennell accepted Maria's historicity without comment, but in 1992, the British Byzantinist Donald Nicol simply wrote that Russian sources ascribed a daughter to Andreas by this name, unknown in western sources.

=== Maria of Tver's jewels ===
The Russian chronicles relate that Maria and Vasily were involved in a scandal in 1483. On 10 October 1483, Ivan III wished to honor the birth of his grandson Dmitry Ivanovich by giving a valuable setting or cluster of jewels, or possibly a necklace, to Dmity's mother Elena of Moldavia. The jewels had originally been part of the dowry of Ivan III's first wife, Maria of Tver, and had been entrusted to Sophia. When Ivan III asked Sophia to hand them over, she was unable to do so. Sophia had squandered a lot of Ivan's treasure, giving some of it to her brother Andreas and some of it, including the jewels, as the dowry of Maria on her marriage to Vasily. Ivan, furious, decided not to punish Sophia, but instead punish Vasily, whose only crime was having accepted Sophia's presents. Agents were sent by Ivan to Vereya to take back the jewels, and to capture Vasily and Maria, threatening imprisonment. Though Sophia was sympathetic to her niece and nephew-in-law, Vasily was not confident in Sophia's influence at the Muscovite court and fled to Lithuania, though Maria of Tver's jewels were left behind and were successfully confiscated by Ivan's agents. According to John Lister Illingworth Fennell, there was likely more to this incident than is stated in the chronicles, given that it is unlikely that Vasily and Maria would have gone so far as to flee the country and disinherit themselves over just as trivial a mistake as Maria's aunt wrongly giving away Maria of Tver's jewels.

Sophia succeeded in getting permission from Ivan for Vasily's and Maria's return to Russia in January 1493, though not permission for Vasily being restored to his lands in Vereya. Vasily, not satisfied, wrote back, asking for lands and promising to return items from Ivan's treasury, given to them by Sophia along with the jewels, which he and Maria had taken with them to Lithuania. In August 1495, a message from the Muscovite court asked Vasily to provide a list of the valuables in his possession, after which no further communication is recorded. Maria is said to have died in 1505. According to Adam Boniecki, Maria and Vasily had a daughter, Sophia Vereyska, who was granted some of Vasily's goods in 1506 and may have married Albertas Goštautas.
