= Andreas Palaiologos (son of Manuel) =

Son of Manuel Palaiologos

- Born: After 1476; Constantinople, Ottoman Empire (modern-day Istanbul, Turkey)
- Died: After 1520
- Noble family: Palaiologos
- Father: Manuel Palaiologos

Andreas Palaiologos (Greek: Ἀνδρέας Παλαιολόγος; fl. 1520), sometimes anglicized to Andrew Palaeologus, was a son of Manuel Palaiologos. Andreas was likely named after his uncle, Manuel's brother, Andreas Palaiologos. Andreas's father had returned from exile under the protection of the Papacy to Constantinople in 1476 and had been generously provided for by Mehmed II of the Ottoman Empire, who had conquered the city from Manuel's relatives in 1453. Although Manuel remained a Christian until his death at some point before 1512, Andreas converted to Islam and served as an Ottoman court official under the name Mehmet Pasha. He was the last certain member of the imperial branch of the Palaiologos family.

== Biography ==
Andreas Palaiologos was the son of Manuel Palaiologos and grandson of Thomas Palaiologos, a brother of Constantine XI Palaiologos, the final Byzantine emperor. Although Constantine XI had died defending Constantinople from the Ottomans and Sultan Mehmed II in 1453, and Thomas had fled into exile in 1460, Manuel travelled to Constantinople in 1476 to throw himself on the mercy of Mehmed II. Previously, Manuel had lived with his brother Andreas under the protection of the papacy in Rome, but a constant cutting of their provided pension had led to a poor financial situation. After having received several dissatisfactory offers from various Western European dukes, Manuel was pleased with the generous payment he received from Mehmed II in Constantinople and stayed in the city for the rest of his life. In addition to income, Manuel was also provided with housing and two concubines by the sultan. With these two concubines, or possibly a wife, Manuel fathered at least two sons; John, who died young, and the younger Andreas.

Manuel died a Christian at some point during the reign of Mehmed II's son and successor, Bayezid II (r. 1481–1512), but Andreas converted to Islam. In 1932, Andreas was identified by Greek Byzantinist Dionysios Zakythinos as the same individual as Mesih Pasha, an Ottoman soldier who partook in a failed attack on Rhodes in 1480. Since Andreas would have been at most four years old at the time, the identification is erroneous. The real Mesih Pasha appears to have had certain Palaiologos descent, however, being the son of a Thomas Palaiologos Gidos. The English historian Steven Runciman writes that the Muslim name of Andreas was Mehmet Pasha and that he served as a court official in Constantinople.

Andreas is not believed to have had children of his own. English historian William Miller writes that Andreas, under the name Mehmet Pasha, is last heard of in the reign of Suleiman the Magnificent (r. 1520–1566). Though nobles with the name Palaiologos are recorded in later centuries, notably a family from Pesaro in Italy who claimed descent from the Imperial dynasty, their lineages cannot be confidently verified. If only those Palaiologoi whose legitimate male-line descent can be confidently verified are considered, the death of Andreas at some point in the 16th century marked the extinction of the imperial family.
