= Borgia Apartments =

Suite of rooms in the Apostolic Palace in Vatican City

- Appartamenti Borgia
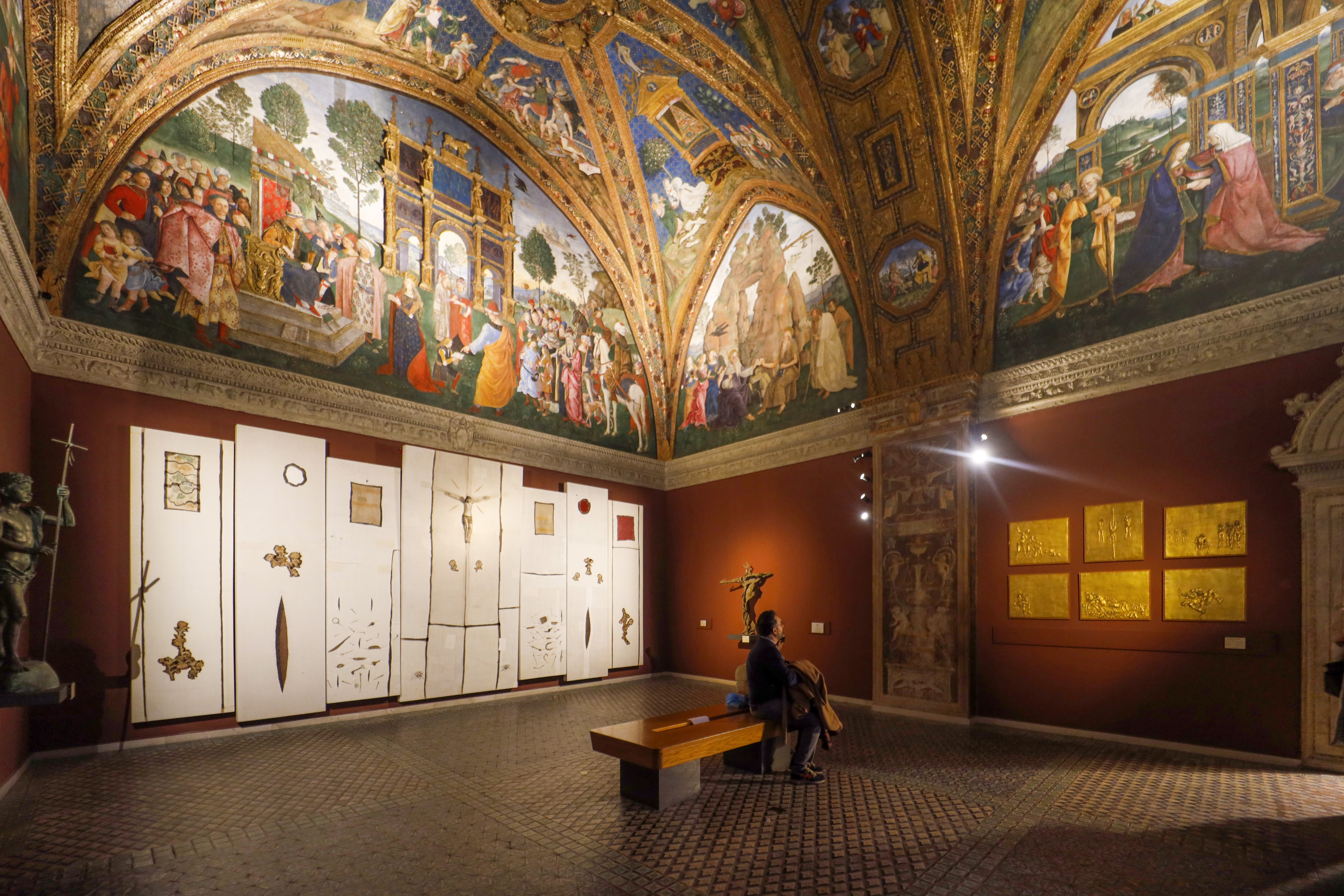
- Pinturicchio’s frescoes in the Borgia Apartments

- Location within Vatican City

General information
- Type: Papal residence (former), museum space
- Architectural style: Renaissance
- Location: Apostolic Palace, Vatican City
- Coordinates: 41.9029°N 12.4534°E
- Construction started: c. 1492
- Completed: c. 1494
- Client: Pope Alexander VI
- Owner: Holy See

Technical details
- Material: Stone, fresco

Design and construction
- Architect: Pinturicchio (fresco decoration)
- Designations: Part of the Vatican Museums

The Borgia Apartments are a suite of rooms in the Apostolic Palace in the Vatican, adapted for personal use by Pope Alexander VI (Rodrigo de Borja). In the late 15th century, he commissioned the Italian painter Bernardino di Betto (Pinturicchio) and his studio to decorate them with frescoes.

The paintings and frescoes, which were executed between 1492 and 1494, drew on a complex iconographic program that used themes from medieval encyclopedias, adding an eschatological layer of meaning celebrating the supposedly divine origins of the Borgias. Five of the six apartments include frescoes painted in the vault. The upper register of the vaults contain paintings, while the lower registers are decorated with tapestries and gold. Recent cleaning of Pinturicchio's fresco The Resurrection has revealed a scene believed to be the earliest known European depiction of Native Americans, painted just two years after Christopher Columbus returned from the New World.

The Borgia Apartments includes six rooms: Room of the Sibyls, Room of the Creed, Room of the Liberal Arts, Room of the Saints, Room of Mysteries, and Room of Pontiffs. The Room of Sibyls and the Room of Creed include frescoes of the Old Testament prophets and sibyls. These rooms also pay homage to the planets. In the Room of Liberal Arts, Pinturicchio has represented the liberal arts as female figures through his frescoes in the vault. The Room of Saints consists of frescoes detailing the lives of seven notable saints, including Barbara, Catherine, Anthony, Paul, Susanna, and Elizabeth. Pinturicchio's last room, the Room of Mysteries, contains frescoes with New Testament subject matter, including the Nativity, Ascension, Adoration of the Magi, and other scenes.

The Room of the Pontiffs was erected before all the other buildings, between 1277 and 1280. Built between 1447 and 1455, the Room of the Liberal Arts, Saints, and Mysteries were referred to as "secret rooms" by Pope Alexander VI's master of ceremonies, Johannes Burchard.

As of 2019, the suite was open to tourists.

== Frescoes ==
When the Borgia family fell out of favor after the 1503 death of Pope Alexander VI, the apartments were little used for centuries. The following pope, Julius II, abandoned the apartments and moved his daily responsibilities to the upper floors, which are now called the Raphael Rooms. When Julius II vacated the apartments, they fell into disrepair. The paintings were removed in 1816, and the rooms were turned into a library. Only in 1889 did Pope Leo XIII have the rooms restored and opened for public viewing. The works in the apartment are now considered part of the Vatican Library.

The works were restored by repairing the plaster and stucco, cleaning the frescoes, and reworking the surfaces. The lower half of some of the walls in the Borgia Apartments had to be removed, but some decorative remnants are still open for viewing.

Most of the rooms are now used for the Vatican Collection of Modern Religious Art, inaugurated by Pope Paul VI in 1973.

The collection includes about 600 accumulated works of painting, sculpture and graphic art; donations of contemporary Italian and foreign artists and includes works by Paul Gauguin, Marc Chagall, Paul Klee, Salvador Dalí, and Wassily Kandinsky.

The upper part of the walls and vaults, covered with paintings, are further enriched with delicate stucco work in relief. Much of the decor of the apartment was perhaps inspired by the forgeries of the humanist and Dominican friar Annio da Viterbo, master of the palace. The main subjects of the five rooms completed by Pinturicchio are:

=== The Hall of the Mysteries of the Faith ===
Hall of Mysteries of the Faith

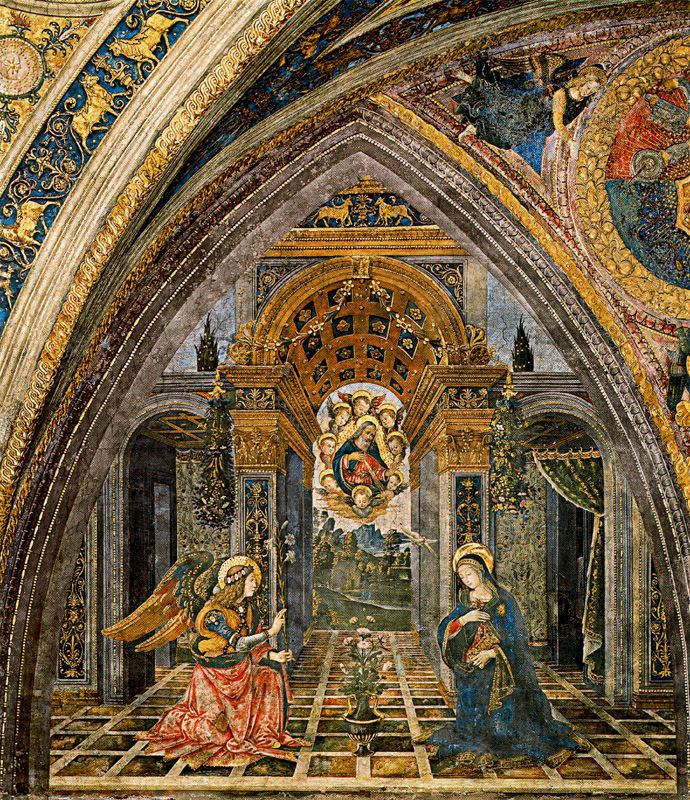
Annunciation

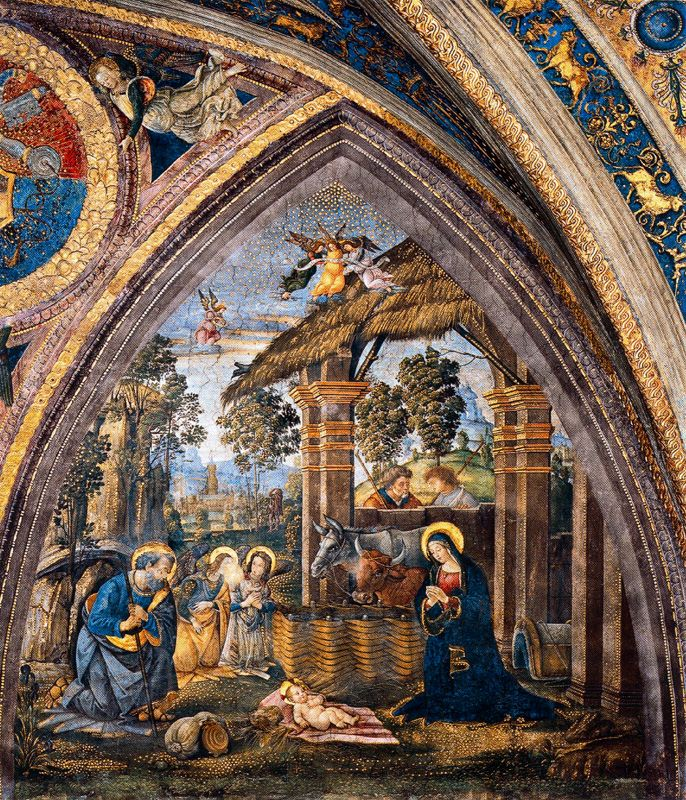
Nativity

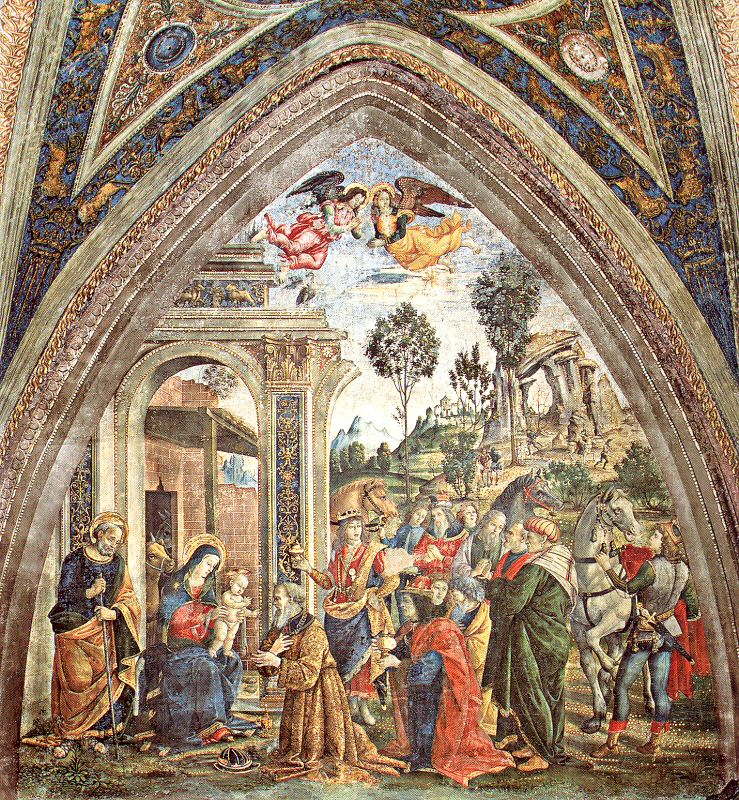
Adoration of the Magi

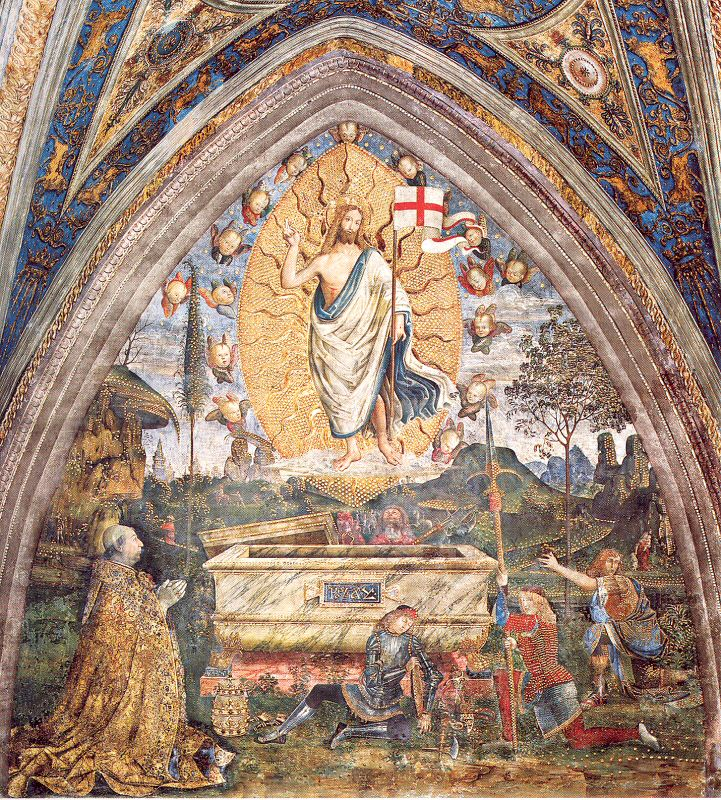
Resurrection

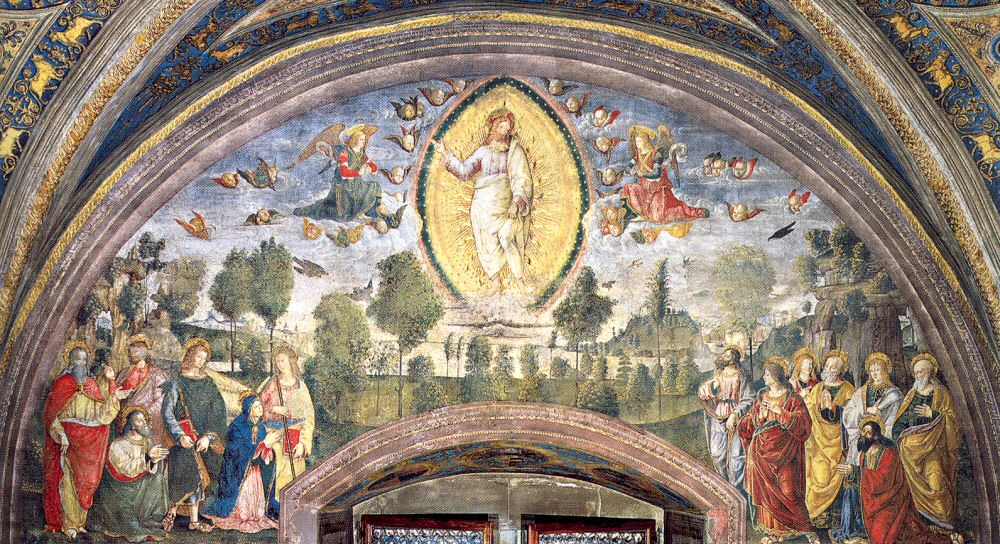
Ascension

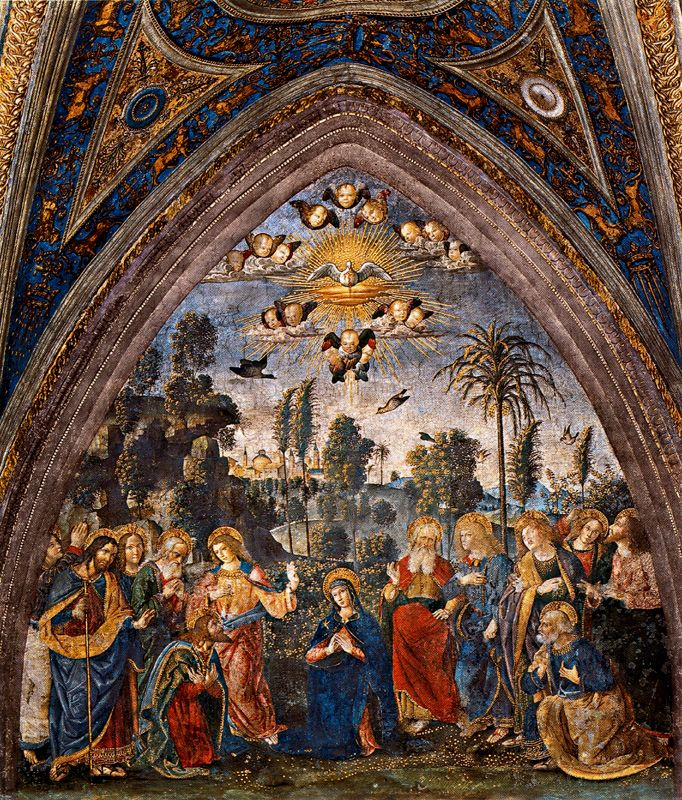
Descent of the Holy Spirit

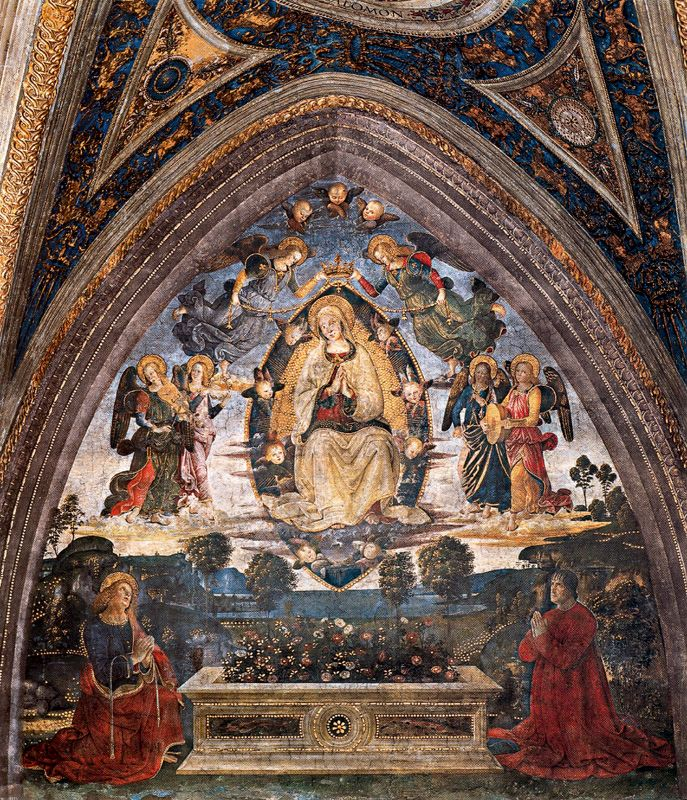
Assumption of the Virgin

=== The Hall of the Saints ===
Hall of the Saints

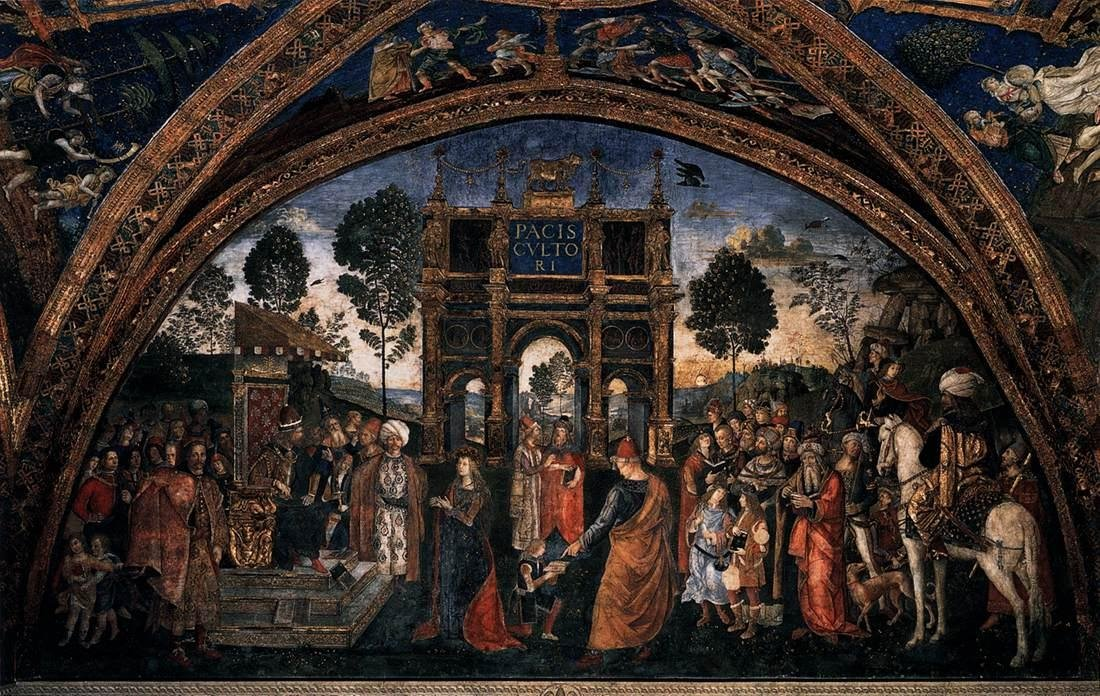
St Catherine's Disputation

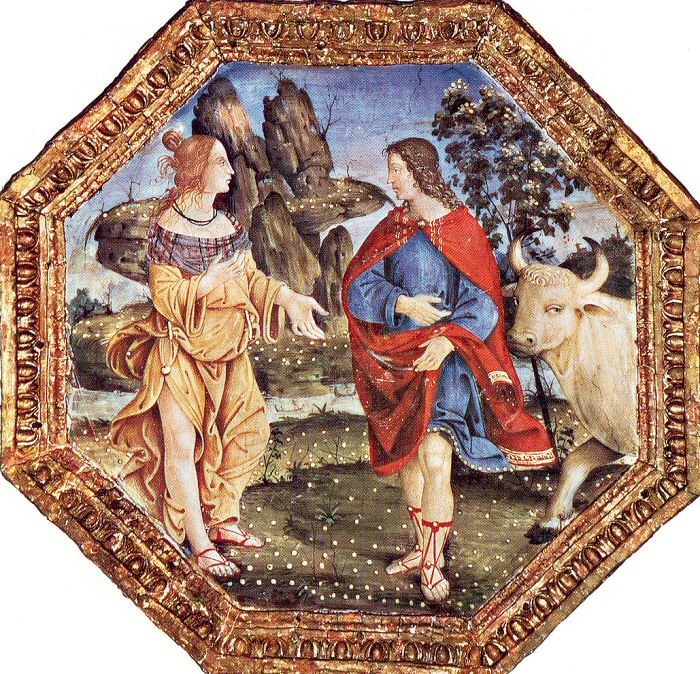
Myth of the Bull Apis

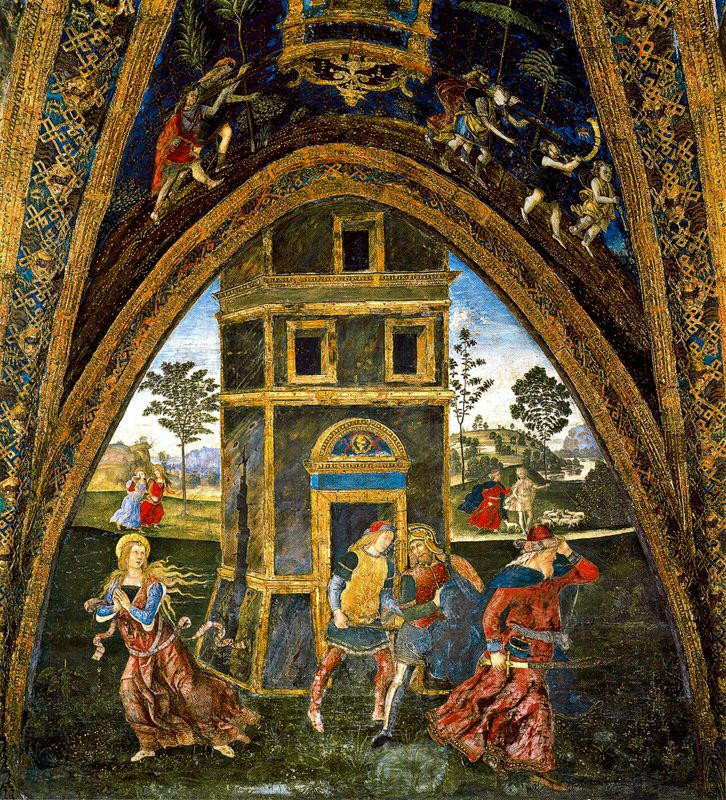
Martyrdom of Saint Barbara

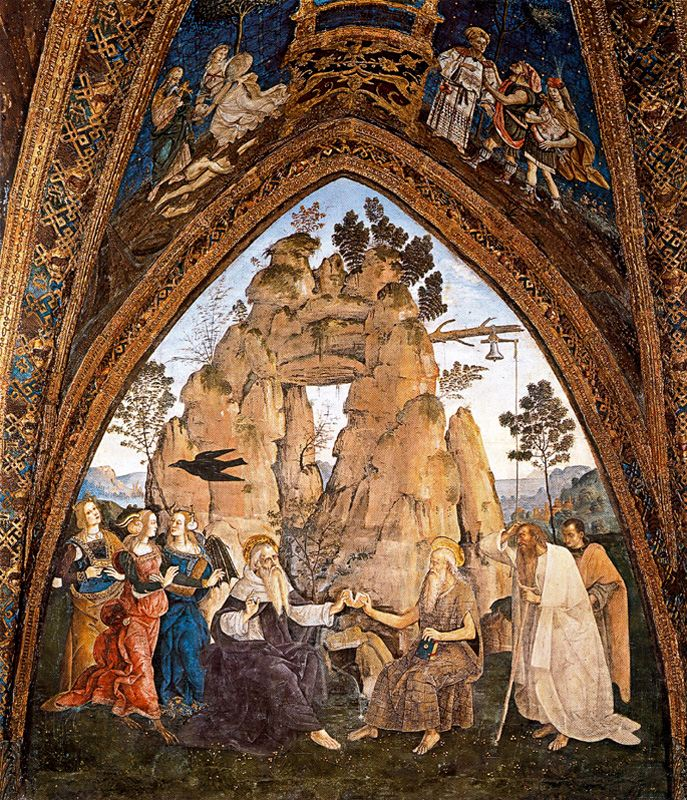
Paul the Hermit

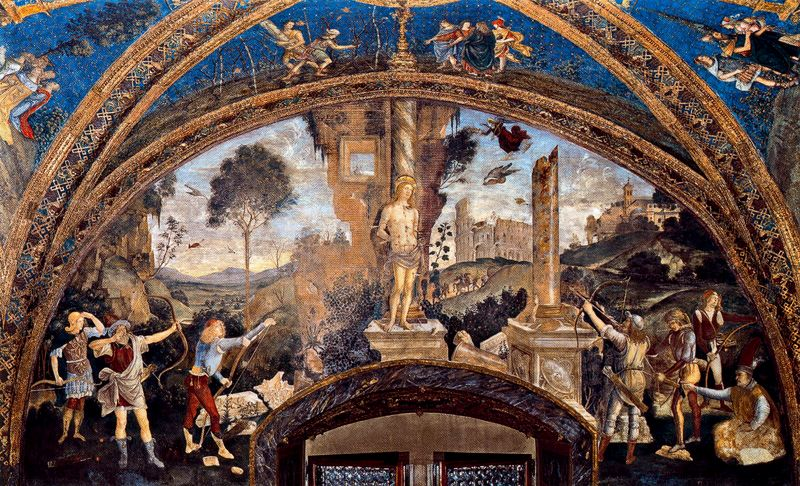
Martyrdom of Saint Sebastian

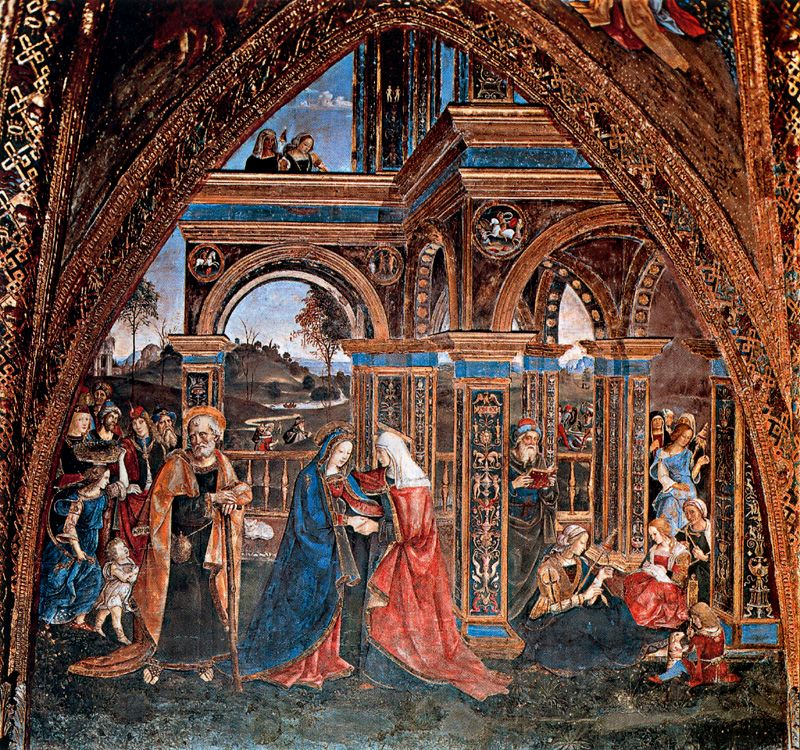
The Visitation

=== The Hall of Trivium and of Quadrivium ===
The Arts of the Trivium and Quadrivium (selected)

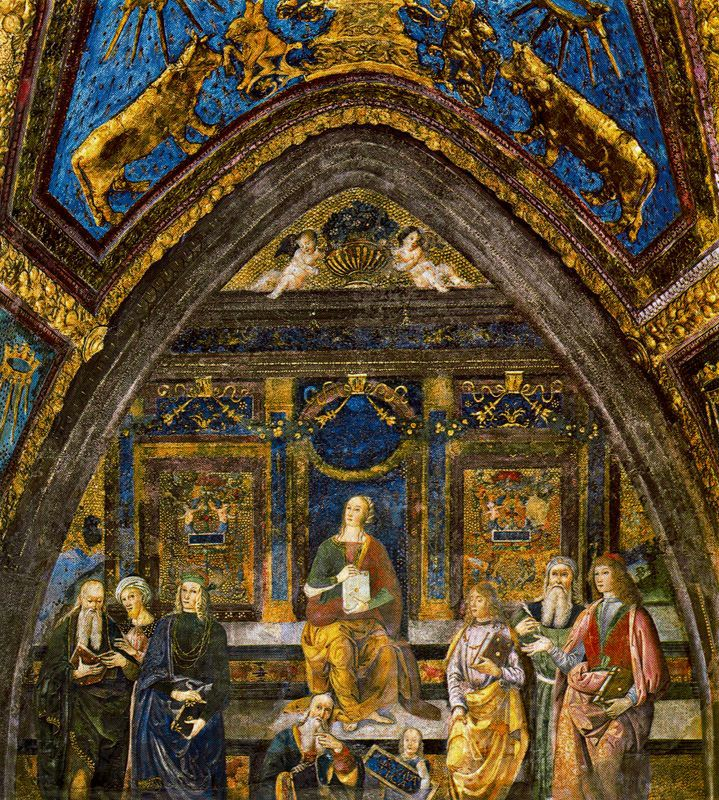
Grammar (Trivium)

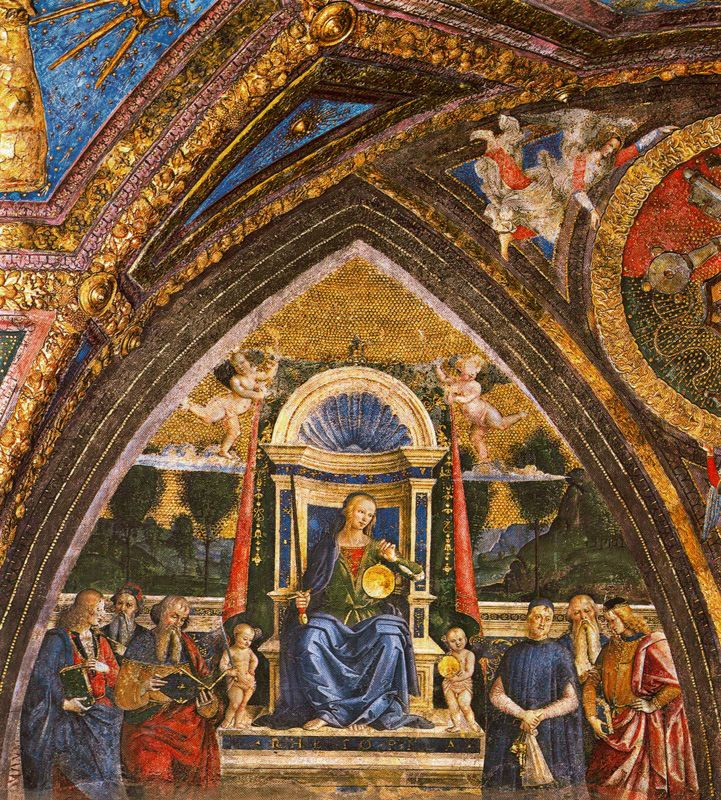
Rhetoric (Trivium)

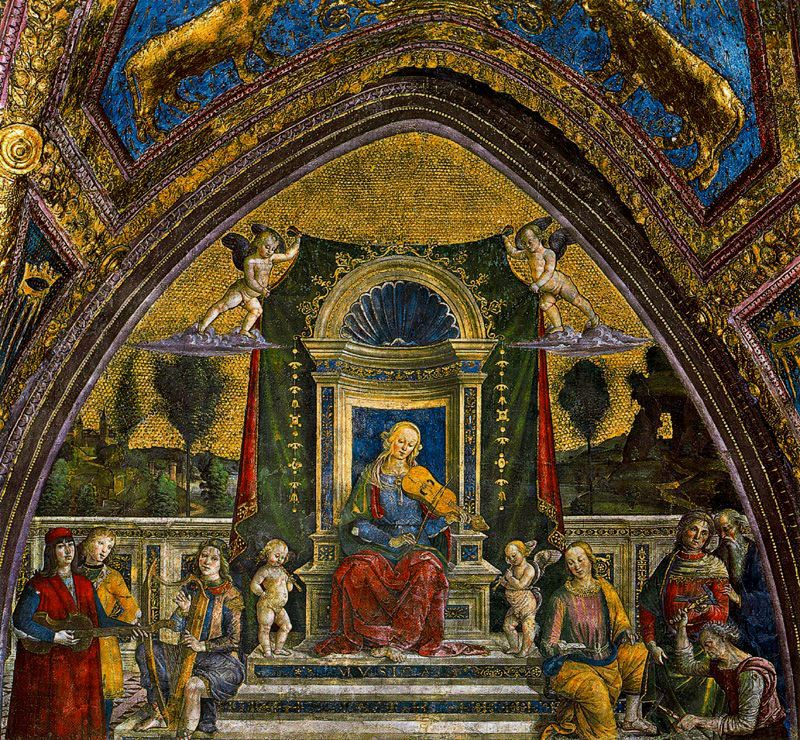
Music (Quadrivium)

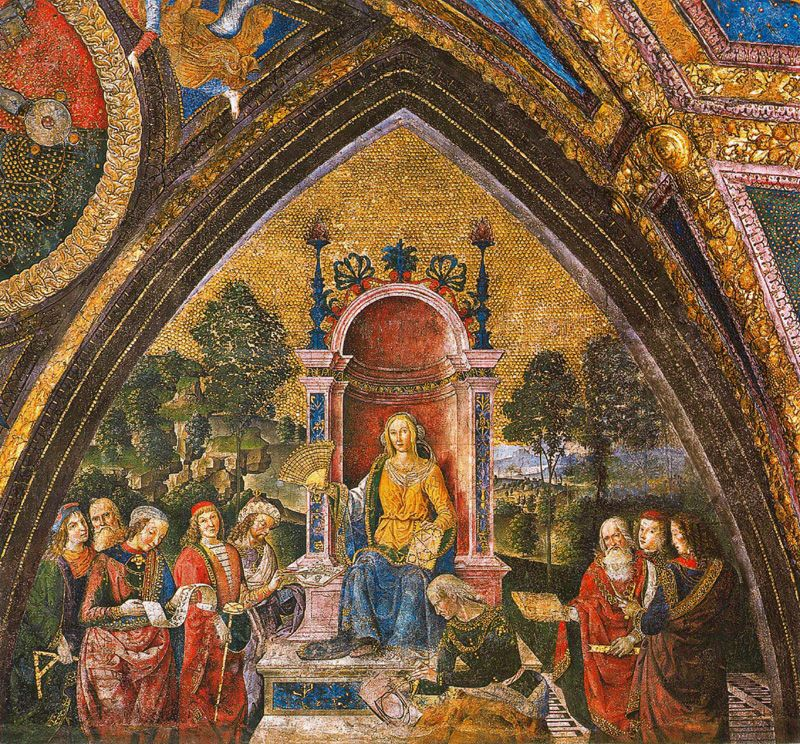
Geometry (Quadrivium)

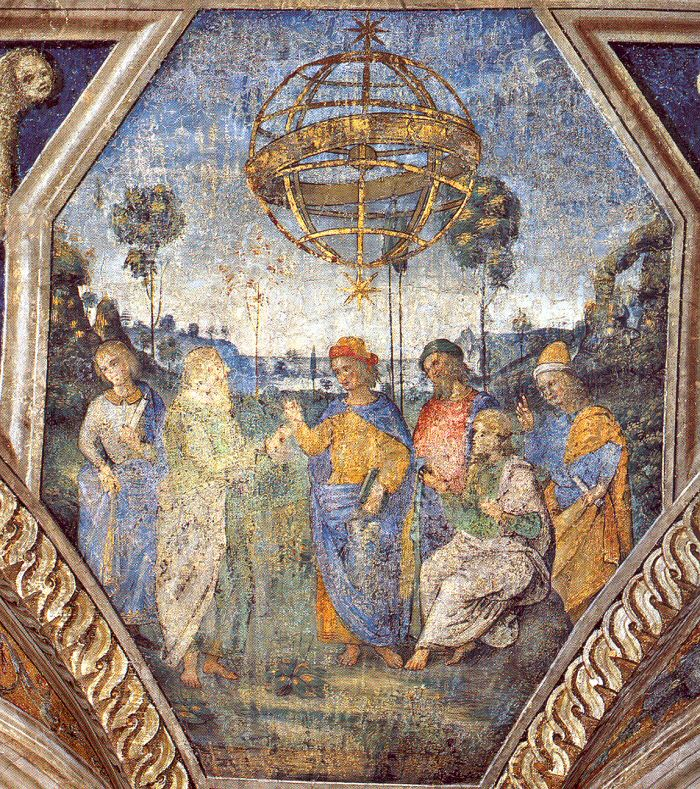
Astrology (Quadrivium)

=== Other rooms ===
- The Room of the Sibyls

Some of the remaining rooms were painted by Perin del Vaga.

== The Room of the Sibyls ==
The Room of Sibyls, which makes up the defensive portion of the Apostolic Palace, consists of twelve depictions of Old Testament prophets, or sibyls. Pope Alexander VI ordered the Borgia Tower to be built for functionary purposes. Pinturicchio delineated the sibyl by representing them with scrolls that signify the coming of Christ. He paints the prophets on top of a deep blue background. The twelve sibyls represented are: "Isaiah-Hellespontine Sibyl, Micah-Tiburtine Sibyl, Ezekiel-Cimmerian Sibyl, Jeremiah-Phrygian Sibyl, Hosea-Delphic Sibyl, Daniel-Eritrean Sibyl, Haggai-Cumaean Sibyl, Amos-European Sibyl, Jeremiah-Agrippine Sibyl, Baruch-Samian Sibyl, Zechariah-Persian Sibyl, Obadiah-Libyan Sibyl."

On the ceiling, Pinturicchio represents the seven planets as Roman divinities pulled by a chariot of animals. Each animal is matched to the planet of their zodiac, and the celestial influence of the planets onto Earth is shown. For example, Mercury is pictured with merchants and Saturn is represented alongside charity. As a tribute to the patron, Pope Alexander VI, Venus is pulled by a herd of bulls, the Borgia coat of arms. Astrology, which was a significant topic amongst many of the Renaissance popes, is depicted at length in the Room of Sibyls.

== The Room of the Creed ==
The Room of the Creed is also part of the Borgia Tower and is arranged in a similar composition to the Room of Sibyls. The frescoes in this room narrate the verses of the Apostle's Creed on the scrolls held by the twelve closest followers of Christ. The Apostle's Creed is a proclamation of beliefs consisting of the main tenets of Christian teachings. This room acts as a bridge between the Old and New Testament material commissioned by the House of Borgia. The pairs of Apostles are as follows: "Peter-Jeremiah, John-David, Andrew-Isaiah, James the Elder-Zechariah, Matthew-Hosea, James the Younger-Amos, Philip-Malachi, Bartholomew-Joel, Thomas-Daniel, Simon-Malachi, Thaddaeus-Zechariah, and Matthew-Obadiah."

The ceiling in the Room of the Creed is decorated with geometrical figures. The renderings of the apostles, both in the Room of the Creed and in the Room of Sibyls, are more formal and angular. Some of Pinturicchio's classic details, including the folds of the figures' robes and head-dress, are evident in the frescoes of the Apostles. The windows in the Room of the Creed also include fantastical ornamentation; natural imagery such as fishes and deer intermingle with cupids and metaphorical representations of music.

== The Room of Liberal Arts ==
The Room of Liberal Arts contains Pinturicchio's allegorical depictions of the seven Liberal Arts, which are Grammar, Rhetoric, and Logic (Trivium) and Geometry, Arithmetic, Music, and Astronomy (Quadrivium). Pinturicchio represents each of these figures as celestial women, accompanied by human figures paying tribute and praying to each of them. For example, Cicero accompanies Rhetoric and Euclid extols Geometry. Furthermore, the Room of Liberal Arts also includes a female portrayal of Justice on a throne, holding a sword and a balance. Justice is depicted on the median arch that divides the decorative ceiling from the narrative cycle on the walls. Some of the biblical episodes on the walls include Jacob Fleeing from Laban and Trajan and the Poor Widow. The ceiling details the deeds and the coat of arms of the House of Borgia in stucco, including a double crown for the kingdoms of Aragon and Sicily, a crimson flame and an ox, and a sun.

While the function of the room is still subject to scholarly debate, it is commonly known as the study for the prominent members of the Borgia family. Two of the smaller halls adjoining the Room of Liberal Arts may have been used as a bedroom and bathroom.

Art restorers began extensive work in the Room of Liberal Arts in 2016, uncovering a damaged painting of Pinturicchio's "The Resurrection," which illustrated Native Americans in Europe and the United States. Pinturicchio's work was done with dry plaster instead of wet, which made it more amenable to damage or ruin. His fingerprints and those of his assistants were found in the fresco cycle, and his signature appears underneath the lunette of the personification of Rhetoric. It is believed that Pope Alexander VI wanted Pinturicchio to paint allegories of religious origin stories, many from Egypt and Ancient Rome. The restorers uncovered intense hues of blue, red, and green. In the panel associated with the personification of Music, Pinturicchio painted musicians with Spanish influence as an homage to Pope Alexander VI's home.

== The Room of Saints ==
The Room of Saints portrays episodes from the lives of seven saints in the Bible, along with the largest and finest illustration of the Borgia coat of arms, the bull. The seven saints included are Elizabeth, Anthony, Barbara, Susanna, Sebastian, Paul, and Catherine. Pinturicchio paints notable scenes such as The Visitation, depicting Saint Elizabeth, and Susannah and the Elders, depicting Saint Sebastian. By associating the bull with the lives of saints, Pope Alexander VI ties his reign to divine blessing. The eight ceiling frescoes narrate the story of Isis, Apis, and Osiris, adding to Pope Alexander VI's interest in Egypt. The ceiling is divided into triangular vaults. The first three vaults showcase Osiris's teachings, succeeded by his marriage to Isis, and finally Typhon's murder of Osiris. The Room of the Saints, one of the "secret rooms" of the Borgia Apartments, may have been used as a private space for the Pope.

== The Room of Mysteries ==
The Room of Mysteries holds the fresco cycle representing the mysteries of the faith, which were thought to have influenced Raphael's Disputation of the Holy Sacrament. The biblical scenes displaying the mysteries of faith are painted to inspire a sense of piety in the viewer. Pinturicchio's work in this room is ubiquitous, meant to act as a holy teaching for beginners in religious education. The figures in this room are more restricted in their emotion and motion. The Room of the Mysteries includes The Annunciation, The Nativity, The Adoration of the Magi, and The Resurrection. Pope Alexander VI was a devotee of the Virgin Mary, which is why many of Pinturicchio's episodes in this room were dedicated to her life and legacy. Pope Alexander VI is represented on this fresco cycle, within The Resurrection painting, kneeling at Christ's feet.

== See also ==
- Index of Vatican City-related articles
