= Manuel Palaiologos =

Prince of the Palaiologos dynasty

- Born: 2 January 1455; Morea, Byzantine Empire
- Died: Before 1513 (aged <57); Constantinople, Ottoman Empire (modern-day Istanbul, Turkey)
- Noble family: Palaiologos
- Issue: John Palaiologos; Andreas Palaiologos
- Father: Thomas Palaiologos
- Mother: Catherine Zaccaria

Manuel Palaiologos (Greek: Μανουήλ Παλαιολόγος, romanized: Manouēl Palaiologos; 2 January 1455 – before 1513) was the youngest son of Thomas Palaiologos, a brother of Constantine XI Palaiologos, the final Byzantine emperor. Thomas took Manuel and the rest of his family to Corfu after the Fall of Constantinople in 1453 and the subsequent Ottoman invasion of the Morea in 1460. After Thomas's death in 1465, the children moved to Rome, where they were initially taken care of by Cardinal Bessarion and were provided with money and housing by the papacy.

The money provided by the papacy was gradually cut back and Manuel eventually left Rome in 1474 in order to seek his fortune by offering military service to various nobles and rulers in Europe, including Galeazzo Maria Sforza of Milan and Charles the Bold of Burgundy. Disappointed with the offers he received, and with the papacy cutting the money back further, Manuel surprised the establishment in Rome by travelling to Constantinople in 1476 and throwing himself on the mercy of the Sultan Mehmed II, who had conquered the city 23 years earlier. The sultan generously received Manuel, who stayed in Constantinople for the rest of his life. The Ottomans called him "el Ghazi" ("holy warrior").

Though Manuel maintained his Christian faith, it is possible that he served in the Ottoman navy. He fathered at least two sons; John, who died young, and Andreas, who converted to Islam.

== Biography ==
=== Life in exile ===
Manuel was born on 2 January 1455 as the second son of Thomas Palaiologos, Despot of the Morea, and Catherine Zaccaria, the daughter of Centurione II Zaccaria, the last Prince of Achaea. After his uncle Constantine XI Palaiologos, the last Byzantine emperor, died defending Constantinople, the capital of the Byzantine Empire, on May 29, 1453, Manuel's family continued to live in the Morea as vassals of the Ottoman Sultan Mehmed II. But constant bickering between Thomas, who tried to rally support to restore the Byzantine Empire, and his brother Demetrios, who sided with the Ottomans, led the Sultan to invade the Morea in 1460; Thomas, Catherine and their children escaped to the Venetian-held island of Corfu. Thomas then left his family to go to Rome, where he was welcomed and provided for by Pope Pius II. Thomas maintained hope that he would one day recover his lands and when preparations were made for a crusade (which ultimately never took place), Thomas personally rode around Italy to drum up support.

Although Catherine Zaccaria died in August 1462 and Thomas summoned the children to Rome shortly thereafter, Manuel and his older brother Andreas did not choose rejoin their father until a few days before Thomas died in 1465. The two brothers, and their sister Zoe, travelled from Corfu to Rome in 1465 but arrived there after their father had already died. Manuel was 10 years old at the time and Andreas was 12. The children were put in the care of Cardinal Bessarion, who had fled the Byzantine Empire in 1439. Bessarion provided the education for the children and also arranged Zoe's marriage to Duke Ivan III of Moscow in June 1472. Manuel and Andreas continued to stay in Rome by consent of the Pope, who recognised Andreas as the heir of Thomas and the rightful Despot of the Morea.

The money that had been provided to their father was reduced for the two brothers. Thomas had received 300 ducats a month from the Pope, with an additional 200 a month provided by the cardinals, but with his death, the cardinals stopped providing extra money and the 300 ducats were split between the two brothers, effectively reducing a pension of 500 to one of 150. Thomas's courtiers had complained that his pension had barely been enough to sustain his household and reducing it to this extent for his sons made their financial situations difficult. Andreas attempted to earn money by offering to sell his claims on the imperial title to various rulers in Europe, but as Manuel was second-in-line (as the younger brother), he had no claims to sell.

Thus, the young prince left Rome in early 1474 to travel around Europe and seek his fortune, offering his services to various rulers and nobles. In November, Manuel was at Milan, where he offered Duke Galeazzo Maria Sforza to enter Milanese service in some military capacity. The Duke appears to not have given Manuel a satisfactory offer and the following year he was instead at Vaudémont in Lorraine, offering similar services to Charles the Bold, the Duke of Burgundy. Charles offered to employ Manuel for a monthly pay of 100 écus, but Manuel declined as the sum was too little to sustain his retinue. Soon thereafter, he returned to Rome.

=== Manuel in Constantinople ===
Upon his return to Rome, Manuel discovered that the meagre papal pension provided to him and Andreas had been halved to account for his absence. Despite his return to the city, the two brothers continued to only receive half of the previously agreed amount, getting only 150 ducats a month instead of 300. In despair of this financial situation, and knowing that he would not receive satisfactory offers in Western Europe, Manuel again left Rome in the spring of 1476 at the age of 21. Much to the surprise of everyone else involved, Manuel travelled to Constantinople and threw himself on the mercy of Mehmed II.

Having been born after the city's fall, Manuel had never seen Constantinople before and would probably have been uncertain of the kind of reception he would receive. In contrast to his reception in Milan and Vaudémont, Mehmed generously received Manuel and provided him with an estate, income (a military salary of 100 aspers a day) and a pair of female concubines. The arrangement was similar to the one experienced by Manuel's uncle Demetrios Palaiologos in the Ottoman Empire a few years prior and Manuel lived happily in the city until the end of his life. As many other Greeks in the Ottoman Empire, Manuel remained a Christian until his death.

In Constantinople he became known as "el Ghazi" ("holy warrior") and he might have served in the Ottoman navy. With his two concubines, or possibly a wife, Manuel fathered at least two sons; John and Andreas, named after Manuel's brother. John died young and as a Christian, but Andreas converted to Islam. Manuel died at some point during the reign of Mehmed's son and successor, Bayezid II (r. 1481–1512). Little is known of the further life of his son Andreas, who is last attested in the reign of Suleiman the Magnificent (r. 1520–1566). English historian Steven Runciman writes that Andreas took the Muslim name Mehmet Pasha and served as a court official in Constantinople. Neither of Manuel's two sons are believed to have had children of their own. With their deaths, the descendants of the immediate relatives of the last few Byzantine emperors died out.
