= Extinctive prescription =

In domestic law, extinctive prescription is the expiration of a legitimate inheritance as the result of prolonged failure to claim said inheritance. Extinctive prescription is enshrined in the United Kingdom by the Prescription Act 1832.

The concept of extinctive prescription has mixed usage in international law, where it refers to the expiration of the right of a State to pursue claims if it fails to make an initial pursuit within a certain time-frame of the initial incident occurring. Some treaties specifically include it, while others specifically exempt themselves from it. There is, as of 2019, no agreed customary law about whether it exists (and to what degree) in non-stated cases.
