= Girolamo II Angeli =

- Prince of Macedonia; Duke and Count of Drivasto and Durazzo

Grand Master of the Constantinian Order of Saint George
- Tenure: 1679–1687
- Predecessor: Marco Angeli
- Successor: Giovanni Andrea II Angeli
- Born: 1629
- Died: 1687 (aged 57–58)
- Issue: Laura Angeli
- House: Angelo Flavio Comneno
- Father: Andrea Angeli

Girolamo II Angelo Flavio Comneno (Latin: Hieronymus Angelus Flavius Comnenus; 1629–1687) was the Grand Master of the Constantinian Order of Saint George from 1679 to 1687. Girolamo's family, the Angelo Flavio Comneno, claimed descent from the Angelos dynasty of Byzantine emperors, and Girolamo also claimed the titles "Prince of Macedonia" and "Duke and Count of Drivasto and Durazzo".

== Biography ==
Girolamo was born in 1629 as the eldest son of Andrea Angeli, who in turn was the youngest son of Girolamo I Angeli. Girolamo's family, the Angelo Flavio Comneno, claimed descent from the Angelos dynasty of Byzantine emperors. In the mid-15th century, Andrea's uncles Andrea and Paolo were officially acknowledged as descendants of the Angelos emperors by Pope Paul III (r. 1534–1549) and founded the Sacred Military Constantinian Order of Saint George, a chivalric order with invented Byzantine connections.

Girolamo's father Andrea, and then Girolamo himself, had challenged the claim of Angelo Maria Angeli (grand master 1634–1678) to the grand mastership of the Constantinian Order, on the basis of Angelo Maria's father Michele Angeli having been born illegitimate. Despite this, Angelo Maria's lack of children, and the lack of children of his brother and possibly brief successor Marco, led Angelo Maria to designate Girolamo as successor.

Girolamo maintained the friendly relationship that had been established between Angelo Maria and Leopold I, Holy Roman Emperor. On 6 January 1679, Leopold acknowledged a letter from Girolamo which informed the emperor of Angelo Maria's death, and on 22 June 1679, Leopold formally recognized Girolamo's accession to the position of grand master. The relationship between the Angeli and the Holy Roman imperial family went beyond simple courtesies. The two families informed each other of deaths in either family, members of the imperial family sometimes wrote to Girolamo to recommend appointments to the Constantinian Order, and in the correspondence between Girolamo and Leopold, Girolamo was at times addressed as if he were a fellow sovereign monarch.

Girolamo died in 1687. He was succeeded as grand master by his younger brother, Giovanni Andrea II, the last male member of his family. With his wife, whose name is not known, Girolamo at some point fathered a daughter, Laura. Laura's death in 1756 extinguished the Angelo Flavio Comneno family.

== See also ==
- Succession to the Byzantine Empire
