= Enrico de Vigo Paleologo =

Italian eccentric, pretender and con artist

- Born: 1918; Milan, Italy
- Died: 10 November 2012 (aged 93); Cannes, France
- Citizenship: Italian
- Occupation(s): Pretender, con artist

Enrico Constantino de Vigo Aleramico Lascaris Paleologo (Note: Sometimes referring to himself as Henri Constantine de Vigo Aleramico Lascaris Paleologo instead.) (1918 – 10 November 2012), self styled as Prince Enrico III, was an Italian eccentric, pretender and con artist. Possibly of humble origins, the young Enrico worked as a hairdresser in Genoa and had repeated run-ins with the law, at times being convicted of theft, slander and fraud, as well as not paying child support. In order to elevate his status, Enrico fabricated a genealogy which linked him to the Byzantine emperors of the Palaiologos dynasty and further enhanced his claimed descent by also claiming descent from the kings of Serbia, the kings of Jerusalem, the kings of the Two Sicilies and the Roman emperor Nero (r. 54–68). As the legitimate "Emperor of Constantinople", Enrico claimed to be the head of various chivalric orders and also claimed the right to grant titles of knighthood and nobility. Such rights were mainly used by Enrico as a money-making scheme. Throughout his life as "prince", he hosted numerous "charity balls", during which he sold titles to gullible people, some of them celebrities, for considerable amounts of money. Because the balls were frequently hosted at Caesars Palace in Las Vegas and Palm Beach in Florida, Enrico earned the nickname "The Emperor of Palm Beach".

== Biography ==
Enrico was born in Milan in 1918. Of unclear origins, his critics maintained that he had been born to an unmarried Italian woman of humble origins. Enrico's own claimed ancestry was far more illustrious. The earliest direct ancestor in his own self-created genealogy was the Roman emperor Nero (r. 54–68). His supposed bloodline also saw infusions of blood from lineages such as the kings of Serbia, the kings of Jerusalem and the kings of the Two Sicilies. His claim to descent from the Palaiologos dynasty, the last ruling dynasty of the Byzantine Empire, derived either from supposed descent from the despot Thomas Palaiologos, or from supposed descent from a brother of the 18th-century forger Gian Antonio Lazier (called "Gian Antonio Palaeologus" by Enrico), whom claimed to be a descendant of "Emmanuel Peter", an invented son of the despot Theodore II Palaiologos. Enrico proclaimed himself to be the heir of the Palaiologos emperors, given the "extinction of all other family branches" of the dynasty. By virtue of his descent, he claimed to be the legitimate Emperor of Constantinople, King of Thessaly and King of Jerusalem. "His Imperial and Royal Highness" Prince Enrico also maintained that he was the rightful Grand Master of the Constantinian Order of Saint George, a chivalric order with invented Byzantine connections, and his own self-styled order, the "Order of the Cross of Constantinople". He enumerated himself as "Enrico III" (or "Henry III"), after his alleged grandfather, also named Enrico ("Enrico II"). Who "Enrico I" was is not clear, given that no Enrico preceding "Enrico II" appears in Enrico's genealogy.

In 1961, Enrico achieved recognition in some courts in Italy, though these were only local courts and the judges there likely did not investigate any genealogical claims in great detail, nor did they have the authority to recognize and proclaim someone as a Byzantine dynast. Enrico was not the only Byzantine pretender to have been recognized in Italian courts around this time, for instance being preceded by the recognition of the genoese Marziano Lavarello.

In reality, Enrico was not a descendant of the Palaiologoi, or any other imperial or royal dynasty, with his genealogy having been dismissed by multiple authorities as a complete fabrication that contradicts the historical record. Before he went public with his claims, he had been a hairdresser in Genoa, a claim he always specifically later denied, and also involved in several bigamous relationships and he had also been convicted in multiple European courts for theft, slander and fraud. In 1953, Enrico was charged with the theft of 9,464 crates of tinned tomatoes. In 1972, he was pursued by law enforcement for not paying child support to an abandoned wife and several children.

Upon the deposition of the last King of Greece, Constantine II, in 1967, Enrico "felt the hand of destiny on his shoulder" and flew to Athens, where he "put himself on disposal of the Greek people". Though representatives of the new Hellenic Republic met with him, and Enrico insisted on his credentials as Byzantine heir, the Greek government paid little attention to him. Disappointed, Enrico returned to overseeing his imperial orders and the attached charities. In reality, these "charities", and many of Enrico's activities, were little more than scams. The "prince" routinely sold Byzantine honors and also sold plots for cremated ashes of favored supporters at his mansion in France. Much of the funds he handled was allegedly held by a company in the Cayman Islands. In the 1990s, Enrico hosted "charity balls" at Caesars Palace in Las Vegas and Palm Beach in Florida, from which he garnered considerable sums of money. His preference for Palm Beach eventually earned him the nickname "The Emperor of Palm Beach". At one single Las Vegas event, he supposedly made $42,000 for selling titles and coats of arms. At a charity ball he hosted in Tokyo in 2003, he supposedly charged attendees ¥50,000 to sit at his table.

In 2004, Enrico faced controversy in the Taiwanese media after selling fake titles of nobility to Taiwanese celebrities under the guise of "charity work". Enrico faced criticism for knighting celebrities willing to pay at prior occasions as well. Also criticized was that Enrico in 2000 had proclaimed the Chinese man Sara Kuo as "Ambassador Extraordinary Plenipotentiary to Asia Pacific Area"; Sara Kuo was later in that year found to be a gang member in Hong Kong and Shenzhen. In response to the accusations against him, Enrico accused various Asian magazines and TV channels of "smearing his humanitarian activities". One of Enrico's chief defenders in Taiwan was Lin Fu-Shen, a former law professor at the National Taiwan University who had been fired due to sexual harassment. Fu-Shen stated, without evidence, that Enrico had been defended in several court cases in Europe, where the media had claimed that he was a fraud but the courts had ruled that he was authentic. In fact, a court in Salerno ruled in 1981 that Enrico had illegally used the name "Paleologo", and that he had illegally made himself rich through the sale of noble titles, ruling that knights admitted into his "Order of the Cross of Constantinople" were not allowed to use their granted titles. Reportedly, some of the German and Austrian "knights" admitted into the order had paid as much as 10,000 marks. The court ruled that Enrico was a forger, and instead recognized the legitimate Byzantine claimant to be Pietro Paleologo Mastrogiovanni, another forger.

Enrico died in Cannes on 10 November 2012. His orders continue to function to this day, still hosting charity balls, effectively run by the vice chancellor Dewi Sukarno, widow of the former Indonesian dictator Sukarno. Per Enrico's wishes, his wife "Princess Françoise Paleologo" succeeded him as grand master of his orders upon his death. According to his 1999 "succession document", Enrico had two daughters: Marisa and Rosella. Marisa had a son, Giorgio, who in turn had a son, Gianluca. In order to "ensure the continuity of our Dynasty for the longest distant in time possible", the by then very young Gianluca was designated as Enrico's heir as head of the "imperial family", the future "Gianluca I". Given that the official website for Enrico's orders makes no mention of a current head of his house, it is unclear if Gianluca, or any other relative, claimed the position.

== See also ==
- Succession to the Byzantine Empire
