= Theodore Palaiologos =

Theodore Palaiologos or Palaeologus (Greek: Θεόδωρος Παλαιολόγος), can refer to:

- Theodore Palaiologos (son of Michael VIII) (c. 1263 – after 1310), Byzantine prince and general
- Theodore I, Marquess of Montferrat (c. 1291–1338), Marquess of Montferrat in 1306–1338
- Theodore I Palaiologos (c. 1355–1407), Despot of the Morea in 1383–1407
- Theodore II, Marquis of Montferrat (died 1418), Marquess of Montferrat in 1381–1418
- Theodore II Palaiologos (c. 1396–1448), Despot of the Morea in 1407–1443
- Teodoro Paleologo di Montferrato (1425–1484), Catholic bishop
- Theodore Palaiologos (stratiote) (1452–1532), stratiote in the service of Venice
- Theodore Paleologus (c. 1560–1636), alleged descendant of Thomas Palaiologos
- Theodore Paleologus (Junior) (1609–1644), son of Theodore Paleologus
- Theodorious Paleologus (c. 1660–1693), grandson of Theodore Paleologus
- Theodore Palaeologo (c. 1823–1912), 19th-century pretender to the throne of Greece

== See also ==
- Theodore Kantakouzenos (d. 1410), Theodore Palaiologos Kantakouzenos
