= Marco Angeli =

- Prince of Macedonia and Thessaly; Duke and Count of Drivasto and Durazzo

Grand Master of the Constantinian Order of Saint George
- Tenure: 1678–1679 (?)
- Predecessor: Angelo Maria Angeli
- Successor: Girolamo II Angeli
- Born: 1608
- Died: 1679 (?) (aged 70–71)
- House: Angelo Flavio Comneno
- Father: Michele Angeli
- Mother: Lucietta Michiel

Marco Angelo Flavio Comneno (Latin: Marcus Angelus Flavius Comnenus; 1608–1679?) was according to the official reconstruction of the Sacred Military Constantinian Order of Saint George the grand master of the order from 1678 to 1679, though the historicity of his tenure as grand master has been questioned on the basis that he might in actuality have predeceased his supposed predecessor, his older brother Angelo Maria Angeli. Marco's family, the Angelo Flavio Comneno, claimed descent from the Angelos dynasty of Byzantine emperors. The modern Constantinian Order attributes Marco the titular titles previously used by his older brother; "Prince of Macedonia and Thessaly" and "Duke and Count of Drivasto and Durazzo".

== History ==
Marco was born in 1608, as the second son of Michele Angeli, who in turn was the eldest son of Girolamo I Angeli. Marco had an older brother, Angelo Maria, as well as three sisters; Ursula, Maria Altadonna and Laura. Marco's family, the Angelo Flavio Comneno, claimed descent from the Angelos dynasty of Byzantine emperors. In the mid-15th century, Michele's uncles Andrea and Paolo were officially acknowledged as descendants of the Angelos emperors by Pope Paul III (r. 1534–1549) and founded the Sacred Military Constantinian Order of Saint George, a chivalric order with invented Byzantine connections.

Later and modern lists of grand masters by the Constantinian Order list Marco as the grand master from 1678 to 1679, succeeding his brother Angelo Maria and preceding his cousin Girolamo II. According to these reconstructions, Marco died in 1679 and also used the titles "Prince of Macedonia and Thessaly" and "Duke and Count of Drivasto and Durazzo". Though he is known to have been Angelo Maria's designated heir throughout his tenure as grand master, it is unclear whether Marco's tenure as grand master is historical. According to Guy Stair Sainty, who wrote a historical account of the order, published by the order itself in 2018, Marco predeceased Angelo Maria (who died in 1678). According to Sainty, Angelo Maria was directly succeeded by Girolamo II.

== See also ==
- Succession to the Byzantine Empire
