= Peter Mills (pretender) =

Pretender and eccentric

Petros I Palaeologus
- Despot and Autokrator of the Romans
- Undated photograph of Peter Mills, in his uniform

Roman emperor (titular; self-proclaimed)
- Successor: Patricia Palaeologina
- Born: 1927; Newport, Isle of Wight, England
- Died: 2 January 1988 (aged 60–61); Ventnor, Isle of Wight, England
- Spouse: Patricia Palaeologina
- Dynasty: Palaiologos (claimed)

Peter Francis Mills (1927 – 2 January 1988), self-styled as Petros I Palaeologus, was an English eccentric and pretender from the Isle of Wight. Mills believed that his mother's last name, Colenutt, was derived from Koloneia, an ancient province of the Byzantine Empire, and consequently believed himself to be descended from the Palaiologos dynasty, the empire's final ruling family. Though his genealogy was never completely finished, Mills took the titles "Despot and Autokrator of the Romans" and "Duke of Morea", though he never achieved any widespread recognition and never seriously attempted to enforce his claims. Mills was often seen around his hometown of Newport dressed either in a military uniform or long, flowing robes. Upon his death in 1988, Mills' second wife Patricia took up his claim as "Empress of the Romans", his children by his first wife having denounced his pretensions as a "utter sham".

== Biography ==
Peter Francis Mills was born in 1927 in Newport on the Isle of Wight. The names of his parents were Frank Mills and Robena Colenutt. Frank Mills originally came from the Isle of Ely in Cambridgeshire. Mills was the last and perhaps most prominent in a long series of pretenders claiming to descend from the Byzantine Palaiologos dynasty in the British Isles. Though the earliest "British Palaiologoi" could have been legitimate dynasts, such as the assassin Theodore Paleologus (c. 1560–1636), the majority of figures, especially in later times, clearly only had invented or fabricated connections to the old dynasty, such as Nicholas Macdonald Sarsfield Cod'd, an Irishman whom in 1830 claimed descent not only from the Palaiologoi but also from the medieval Irish king Diarmait Mac Murchada, and tried to lay a claim to the newly founded Kingdom of Greece.

Mills claimed Palaiologos descent through his mother. Robena Colenutt was the daughter of Samuel Colenutt, a plumber from Niton, also on the Isle of Wight. The last name Colenutt, and by extension Mills' matrilineal ancestry, can be confidently traced back on the island to the early 18th century. Mills believed that Colenutt was a corruption of Kolonet, in turn a corruption of Koloneia, an ancient Byzantine province. As part of his pretensions, Mills produced a genealogy linking him back to the Palaiologoi, which according to the British historian Justin Pollard requires "some suspension of disbelief". Per the genealogy, a Byzantine prince by the name of "John Laskaris Palaiologos of Kolnet" died in Viterbo in Italy in 1558. Mills identified this John with John Palaiologos, a son of Manuel Palaiologos, nephew of Constantine XI Palaiologos. John supposedly married "Maria Colneat Phokas", the daughter of "Matthew de Kolonet" and a princess of the Aq Qoyunlu. Among the children of John and Maria was supposedly "Richard Komnenos Phokas Palaiologos". Mills also identified John with a figure who appears in the genealogy of the assassin Theodore Paleologus, there contradictingly indicated as the son of Thomas Palaiologos (Manuel's father). In Mills' genealogy, his ancestors were a younger line of descendants of John, but became the legitimate heirs to the Byzantine Empire after the extinction of Theodore Paleologus' family in the late 17th century. Per Mills' genealogy, Richard Komnenos Phokas Palaiologos travelled to England and married "Joanna Dauntsey", whose father was a cousin of Henry VIII of England. Richard and Joanna settled in Combley on the Isle of Wight and had a son, William Colenutt, who was then supposedly ancestral to the later Colenutts on the island. The only supporting evidence for this pedigree were apparently documents in Mills' possession, though they were never shown to anyone else.

Styling himself as "His Imperial Majesty Petros I, Despot and Autokrator of the Romans, The Prince Palaeologus", and also claiming to be the rightful Grand Master of the Constantinian Order of Saint George, as well as the "Duke of Morea", Mills usually wore a faux military uniform, or sometimes long flowing robes. Mills' uniform appears to have been a modified version of a uniform used by certain officers in the British military. Through some of his supposed English ancestors, Mills also claimed the style "Count Saddington". He was often seen around Newport, walking around "with long flowing white hair, sandals but no socks and some sort of order or military award around his neck". Mills frequented the local record office, searching for further proof to strengthen his genealogy, trying to fill in the gaps in his invented lineage.

Although Mills went as far as to appoint an "Imperial Chancellor", who was based in Dunkineely, Ireland, he never made a serious attempt at seeking the throne of Greece, or the throne of the defunct Byzantine Empire. He died in Ventnor on 2 January 1988, aged 61. After his death, his invented claim to the imperial throne was taken up by his second wife and widow Patricia, who continues to use and defend the style "Her Imperial Highness Patricia Palaeologina, Empress of the Romans". Patricia had married Mills in 1985 and was a staunch supporter of his claims. Mills had children by his first wife, who left him in 1975. After Mills' death, his son Nicholas denounced the idea that their family were of imperial descent, calling his father's claims a "complete and utter sham" and hoped that "the ghost of Prince Palaeologus might now be buried once and for all". Several newspapers, such as the Isle of Wight County Press, The Daily Telegraph and The Times, printed obituaries of Mills, identifying him as "His Imperial Highness Petros I Palaeologos".

== See also ==
- Succession to the Byzantine Empire
