= Angelo Maria Angeli =

- Prince of Macedonia and Thessaly; Duke and Count of Drivasto and Durazzo
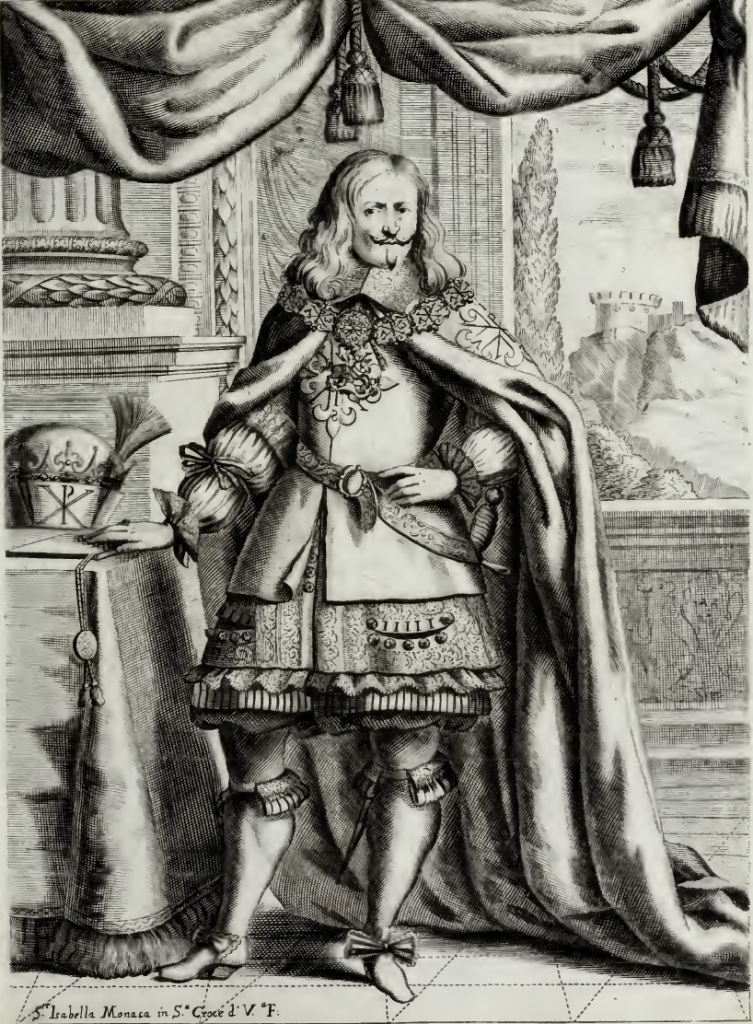
- 17th-century depiction of Angelo Maria Angeli

Grand Master of the Constantinian Order of Saint George
- Tenure: 1634–1678
- Predecessor: Giovanni Andrea I Angeli
- Successor: Marco Angeli
- Born: 1600
- Died: 1678 (aged 77–78)
- House: Angelo Flavio Comneno
- Father: Michele Angeli
- Mother: Lucietta Michiel

Angelo Maria Angelo Flavio Comneno (Latin: Angelus Maria Angelus Flavius Comnenus; 1600 – 1678) was the Grand Master of the Constantinian Order of Saint George from 1634 to 1678. Angelo Maria's family, the Angelo Flavio Comneno, claimed descent from the Angelos dynasty of Byzantine emperors, and Angelo Maria also claimed the titles "Prince of Macedonia and Thessaly" and "Duke and Count of Drivasto and Durazzo".

== Biography ==
Angelo Maria was born in 1600 as the eldest son of Michele Angeli, who in turn was the eldest son of Girolamo I Angeli. Angelo Maria had a younger brother, Marco, as well as three sisters; Ursula, Maria Altadonna and Laura. Angelo Maria's family, the Angelo Flavio Comneno, claimed descent from the Angelos dynasty of Byzantine emperors. In the mid-15th century, Michele's uncles Andrea and Paolo were officially acknowledged as descendants of the Angelos emperors by Pope Paul III (r. 1534–1549) and founded the Sacred Military Constantinian Order of Saint George, a chivalric order with invented Byzantine connections.

Angelo Maria's father Michele was technically of illegitimate birth, having been born while his mother, Ursula Bini, was still married to her first husband, and not to his father, Girolamo I. Although Girolamo and Ursula eventually did marry, on 8 February 1575, the only of the couple's five children to have been born while they were married was their youngest son, Andrea. Though Girolamo succeeded in having Michele legitimized by the Roman Curia on 27 March 1574, his lineage was confirmed by legal courts to be allowed to succeed to the position of grand master and Giovanni Andrea I (grand master 1592–1623 and 1627–1634) explicitly designated Angelo Maria as his successor, Angelo Maria's accession to the position of grand master in 1634 was challenged by his uncle Andrea on the grounds of his "adulterous lineage".

Upon Angelo Maria's accession, the Constantinian Order was effectively run by Majolino Bisaccioni, a prominent member of the order under Giovanni Andrea I, as vice-grand master. Though Bisaccioni accepted Angelo Maria's accession, he did not relinquish his own power and Angelo Maria was unable to actually secure control of the order until Bisaccioni resigned in 1656, 22 years after Angelo Maria inherited the position. As grand master, Angelo Maria managed to improve the financial circumstances of both his family and the Constantinian Order, possibly owing to a large inheritance from his mother, Lucietta Michiel, who belonged to a prominent Venetian noble family. Angelo Maria worked to maintain the prestige and honor of the Constantinian Order, noted for having expelled disorderly members, such as Paolo Francesco Modrono, who was expelled in February 1673 because of criminal proceedings against him.

In 1671, Leopold I, Holy Roman Emperor (r. 1658–1705), confirmed the Holy Roman imperial recognition of the Constantinian Order (previously recognized by Emperor Ferdinand II in 1630), issuing a diploma on 25 June which affirmed the rights of the order and the right of its knights to bear arms throughout the Holy Roman Empire. There are extensive surviving records of correspondence between Leopold and Angelo Maria. Imperial correspondence continued under Angelo Maria's successors. Angelo Maria died in 1678. He was succeeded either briefly by his younger brother Marco, or, if Marco predeceased him, his cousin Girolamo II Angeli.

== See also ==
- Succession to the Byzantine Empire
