= Mario Bernardo Pierangeli =

Mario Bernardo Pierangeli (12 Jun 1914 – 1988), later Michele Angelo-Comneno di Tessaglia, was an Italian tax lawyer, forger and pretender. Claiming descent from the Epirote branch of the Byzantine Angelos dynasty (the Komnenodoukai), Pierangeli from the 1950s onwards claimed the title "Prince of Thessaly and Epirus" as "His Royal and Imperial Highness Michael III".

== Biography ==
Mario Bernardo Pierangeli was born in Rome on 12 June 1914. He originally worked as a tax lawyer, apparently of "mediocre talents", and was a supporter of Benito Mussolini's fascist government of Italy. Several letters written to Mussolini and his government by Pierangeli are preserved in the Central Archives of the State of Italy. He also wrote several books and articles on Italy's past glories and the country's colonial possessions.

After the Second World War, Pierangeli took an interest in his own origin and forged a lengthy genealogy, claiming himself to be a descendant of the Angelos family of the Byzantine Empire. Specifically, Pierangeli claimed descent from John Doukas, a son of Michael II Komnenos Doukas, Despot of Epirus, whose father Michael I was a cousin of emperors Isaac II Angelos and Alexios III Angelos. Throughout the 1950s, Pierangeli gradually changed his name little by little, until he emerged as "Michele Angelo-Comneno di Tessaglia", styled in full as "His Royal and Imperial Highness Michael III, Prince of Thessaly and Epirus, chief of the name and arms of the sovereign house of Angelus-Comnenus". To go with his claims, Pierangeli minted coins in cupronickel, silver and gold, and bestowed titles of nobility on friends and supporters.

By the time of his death in 1988, Pierangeli had successfully acquired a group of loyal followers who supported his claims. Through his marriage to Vittoria Caringi, Pierangeli had several daughters, but no sons. Per Pierangeli's wishes, his claims were inherited by his eldest daughter, Stefania, and her children. Stefania's family maintain Pierangeli's pretensions to this day.

== See also ==
- Succession to the Byzantine Empire
