= Demetrius Rhodocanakis =

19th-century Greek pretender

- Emperor of Constantinople
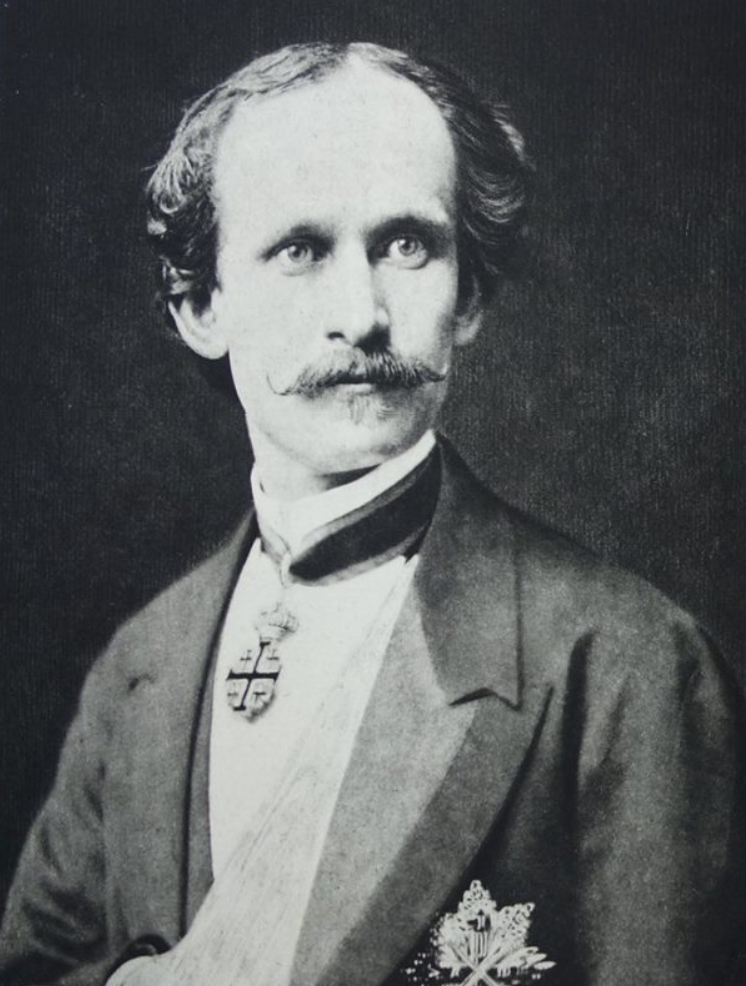
- Photograph of Demetrius Rhodocanakis, unknown date (published in 1902/1903)
- Active: 1867 – February 1895 (as prince); February 1895 – 2 September 1902 (as emperor)
- Born: 3 December 1840; Ermoupoli, Syros, Greece
- Died: 2 September 1902 (aged 61); Ermoupoli, Syros, Greece
- Spouse: Despina Kanaris; Euthymia Samothrakis
- Issue: Arieta Rhodocanakis; Ioannes Rhodocanakis (died young)
- Father: Ioannes Rhodokanakis
- Mother: Arieta Koressi

Demetrius Rhodocanakis (Greek: Δημήτριος Ῥοδοκανάκης, romanized: Dēmētrios Rhodokanakēs; 3 December 1840 – 2 September 1902) was a London-based 19th-century Greek merchant, forger and pretender. Demetrius was the last great Byzantine pretender, (Note: In the sense of achieving relatively widespread recognition. Demetrius was not the last pretender to the Byzantine Empire; numerous forger and impostor would-be Byzantine princes later emerged in the 20th and 21st centuries, none of whom were widely recognized and all of whose claims can readily be dismissed as fantasy.) claiming to be a prince directly descended from the Palaiologos dynasty of the Byzantine Empire from the 1860s onwards, and then the rightful Emperor of Constantinople, as Demetrios II Dukas Angelos Komnenos Palaiologos Rhodokanakis, from 1895 to his death. Though he lost support after 1895 due to his claims of Byzantine descent having been exposed as forgeries, Demetrius was at one point widely recognized as a Byzantine prince, achieving the recognition of not only the British Foreign Office, but also Pope Pius IX.

Demetrius' claim to represent Byzantine royalty rested on a claimed connection between the Rhodocanakis family and the ancient Byzantine Doukas family, as well as on one of his supposed ancestors, also named Demetrius Rhodocanakis, having married a daughter of Theodore Paleologus, a possible descendant of the Palaiologos emperors. Demetrius maintained his claims even after he had been widely discredited, and at some points succeeded in enforcing recognition. Both his 1895 marriage registration and his 1902 death certificate style him as a Byzantine prince. In addition to his pretensions, Demetrius is also remembered as a bibliophile and book collector as well as an important figure in the history of freemasonry in Greece.

== Biography ==
=== Early life ===
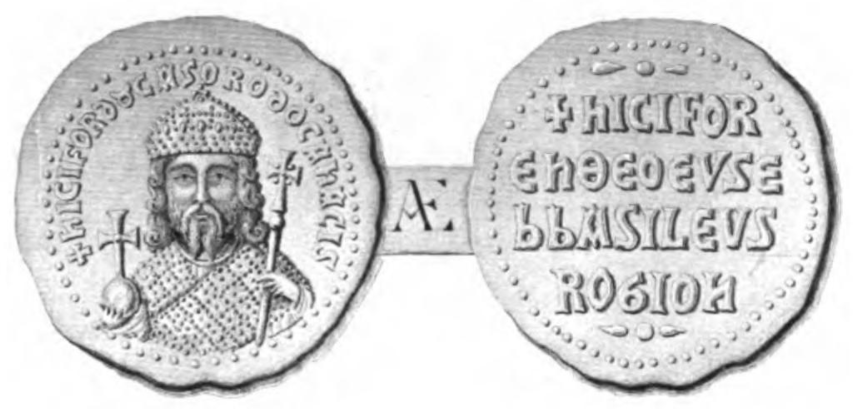
1870 drawing of a coin of the invented figure "Nikephoros Doukas Rhodocanakis", who supposedly ruled as basileus of Rhodes 914–929 and according to Demetrius founded the Rhodocanakis family

Demetrius Rhodocanakis was born in Ermoupoli on the Greek island of Syros on 3 December 1840. He was the son of Ioannes Rhodokanakis (born 23 May 1812), a merchant, and a woman by the name of Arieta Koressi. Their family is noted as having been relatively rich, and it was part of the socio-economic elite of Ermoupoli. Before he began his claims and pretensions in the 1860s, Demetrius rendered his name as Dimitrios Rhodokanachi.

As part of his later pretensions, Demetrius later claimed that his family descended from the Doukas family, a prominent Byzantine noble family which produced a dynasty of emperors that ruled the empire from 1059 to 1078. The Rhodocanakis family were supposedly descendants of an early branch of the Doukids who governed the island of Rhodes. This line was supposedly founded by a "Nikephoros Doukas" in the 10th century, rewarded with the island and the title of "basileus of the island of Rhodes" by the regents of emperor Constantine VII (r. 913–959) in exchange for not taking Constantinople by force and making himself emperor. Nikephoros' revolt supposedly took place in the direct aftermath of the failed usurpation of Constantine Doukas in 913, a real historical event. Per Demetrius' writings, Nikephoros and Constantine were brothers. According to Demetrius, his family name originated as an additional last name used by Nikephoros Doukas thereafter, derived from Rhodoc (Rhodes) and Anaks (king).

Demetrius studied literary history and theology in Athens before attending the universities of London, Oxford and Heidelberg, studying theology and philosophy. After his studies, Demetrius was drawn to England, settling in Manchester in 1860. In 1864, he became a British citizen. In 1862, Demetrius and his brother Theodore had founded a merchant company, "Rhodokanachi Brothers", initially based in Manchester and later moved to London. This company went bankrupt in 1874 or 1875. Thereafter, Demetrius worked as a merchant on his own, operating out of Ethelburga House on Bishopsgate Street in London. In business and merchant contexts, Demetrius continued to style his name as Rhodokanachi, whereas the Latinized version Rhodocanakis was used in any context wherein he pretended to be a prince.

=== Pretensions ===
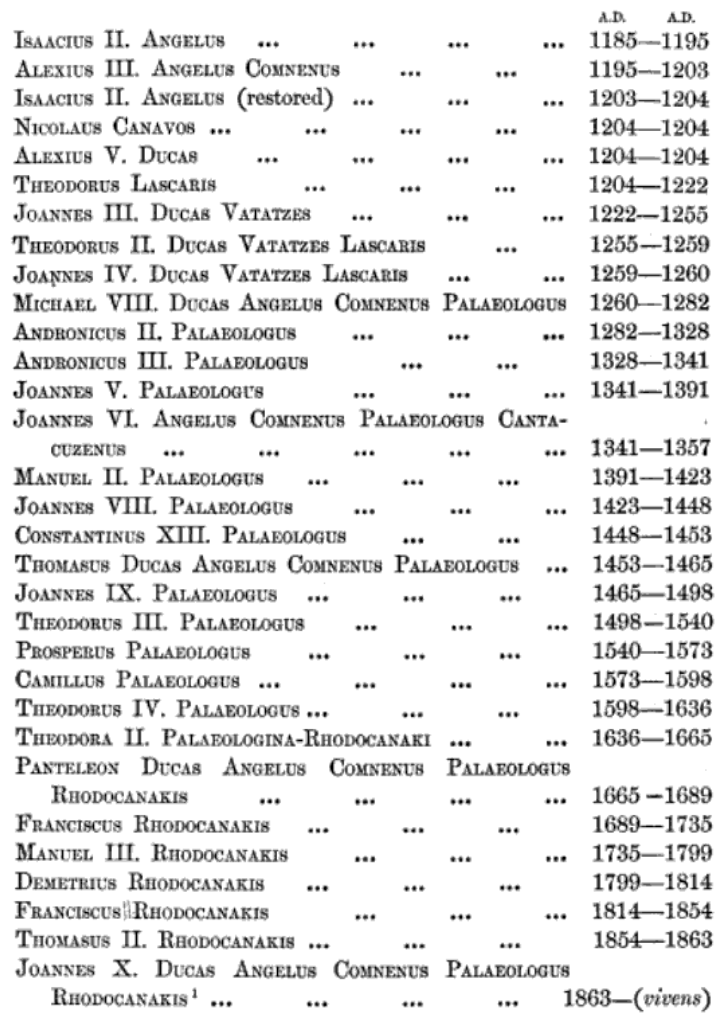
1870 table by Demetrius of reigning and then titular Byzantine emperors from the late 12th century to the 19th century, ending with his father Ioannes (Note: The table lists the reigning Byzantine emperors from Isaac II Angelos (r. 1185–1195 and 1203–1204) to the last emperor, Constantine XI Palaiologos (r. 1449–1453, here numbered Constantine XIII). After Constantine, Demetrius lists Constantine's brother, Thomas Palaiologos, and then the Paleologus family of Pesaro, whose descent from Thomas is not entirely historically verified. Demetrius then lists members of his own Rhodocanakis family. Some technically senior lines of descent are excluded: Demetrios Palaiologos, Thomas Palaiologos' older brother, is not included, nor are the undisputed verified male children of Thomas (Andreas and Manuel), though none of these figures left descendants surviving until Demetrius' time. Demetrius claimed that his family descended from Theodora, a daughter of Theodore Paleologus, through a marriage to "Eudoxia Comnena", an invented figure. The real descendants of Theodore, though they went extinct in the late 17th century, are excluded from Demetrius' line of succession since Theodore's "second" (only actual) wife, Mary Balls, was a Protestant (adhering to the wrong faith) and a commoner (rendering the marriage "illegal").)

In the 1860s, Demetrius forged a genealogy which connected him to the Palaiologos dynasty, the last ruling dynasty of the Byzantine Empire. In 1867, Rhodocanakis successfully convinced the British authorities of his claims and was issued a passport in the name of "His Imperial Highness the Prince Demetrius Rhodocanakis". Rhodocanakis' claims were collected and published by him in 1870 in London, under the title The Imperial Constantinian Order of Saint George: a review of modern impostures and a sketch of its true history. This work was followed in 1883 by an unsigned essay, I principi Rhodocánakis di Chio e l’imperiale Ordine Costantiniano. As a pretender, Rhodocanakis mainly resided at the Clarendon Hotel on New Bond Street in London, though his business on Bishopsgate Street also continued to operate. In 1871, Rhodocanakis' claims were recognized by the papacy after an audience with Pope Pius IX.

Demetrius claimed that his family descended from Theodore Paleologus (c. 1560–1636), who might have been a late-surviving member of the old dynasty, through an otherwise unattested marriage between Theodore and a "Eudoxia Comnena" (an invented figure) on the island of Chios on 6 July 1593. Per the genealogy, Eudoxia died in childbirth three years later, giving birth to a girl, "Theodora Paleologus". In 1614, Theodora is then said to have married "Prince Demetrius Rhodocanakis" in Naples, from whom the later Rhodocanakis family descended. Among Theodora's younger children was supposedly Constantine Rhodocanakis (1635–1687), a real historical figure, whom Demetrius later claimed was his relative. At the time of his forgeries, Demetrius claimed that his father Ioannes (or "Joannes X Ducas Angelus Comnenus Palaeologus Rhodocanakis"), was the titular emperor of the Byzantine Empire. While Demetrius publicized his forgeries, Ioannes continued to be active in Greece and the Mediterranean as a merchant.

Demetrius also claimed that his father was the rightful Grand Master of the Sacred Military Constantinian Order of Saint George, a chivalric order founded in the 16th century by the Angelo Flavio Comneno family (which claimed connections to the Byzantine Angelos dynasty), but which was claimed by them to have been founded in the 4th century by Constantine the Great. Demetrius accepted the legendary and invented origin of the order, but not the genealogical claims of the Angelo Flavio Comneno family, and dismissed them as Italian pretenders and impostors, claiming that his lineage, supposedly deriving from the Palaiologos emperors, represented the true line of grand masters. Demetrius' attempt to claim the Constantinian Order for his own family, was the last in a long line of pretensions to the order. Because the Angelo Flavio Comneno had designed the order to operate under hereditary succession, and they claimed that they were its rightful grand masters as descendants of the Byzantine emperors, several forgers and self-styled princes who dubiously claimed Byzantine ancestry had at times laid claim to the order since its foundation. Demetrius was the last serious Byzantine forger and pretender until an explosion of Byzantine forgers in the later 20th century. In his 1870 book, Demetrius had accused the papacy of ruling against his own ancestors in favor of the Angelo Flavio Comneno family, who had been papally recognized as Byzantine descendants in 1545.

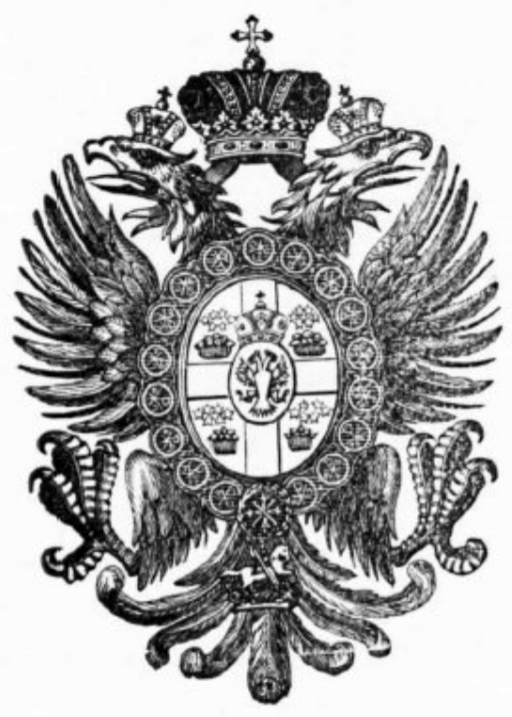
Demetrius' self-assumed coat of arms

Demetrius was not successful in convincing all of his contemporaries and doubts were raised in 1872, when a biography he published on Constantine Rhodocanakis included a portrait of Constantine which was actually a portrait of the author himself, dressed in a costume. In 1895, Émile Legrand, a reputed French hellenist and byzantinologist, accused Demetrius of inventing one of the books he had cited in his 1870 work, Historia Genealogica dell’Antichissima et Augustissima Casa Duca-Angelo-Comnena-Paleologa-Rhodocanakis, supposedly published in 1650 but in reality non-existent. Though Legrand correctly debunked Demetrius' claims, Demetrius had by 1895 already achieved recognition by several important parties, notably the papacy and the British Foreign Office. Demetrius' genealogy had been thoroughly discredited by the early 20th century.

=== Family and later life ===
Ioannes, Demetrius' father, died in February 1895. After his father's death, Demetrius styled himself as "Demetrios II Dukas Angelos Komnenos Palaiologos Rhodokanakis, fifteenth titular emperor of Constantinople". Demetrius was undeterred by Legrand's 1895 accusations against him and continued to maintain his claims until his death.

In addition to being a pretender, Demetrius was also an active freemason and an important figure in the development of freemasonry in Greece. He was the establisher of the Scottish Rite of freemasonry in Greece. In 1868, Mikes Rhodocanakis, a cousin of Demetrius and an active freemason in Greece, reached out to Demetrius to offer him the position of Grand Master. Mikes and his fellow freemasons were surprised when they found at that Demetrius at the time was neither a freemason nor interested in the proposal, though he at some point changed his mind and accepted. On 18 October 1869, Demetrius was initiated, passed and raised at St. Andrew Lodge No. 48 in Edinburgh. Thereafter, Demetrius' was rapidly elevated in rank and was shortly after given a warrant to establish a Supreme Council in Greece. On 14 September 1871, Demetrius left for Greece, arriving in Athens on 20 October after travelling through France and Italy. The new Supreme Council was established on 12 July 1872, with Demetrius as Grand Master. After his election, Demetrius spent some time travelling through Greece, visiting various lodges to smooth out friction and invite delegates to the council.

Demetrius was married twice. The first marriage took place on 24 December 1881 in a village near Athens. The 41-year old Demetrius married a woman by the name of Despina Kanaris, only 18 years old. Kanaris bore Demetrius two children: the daughter Arieta and the son Ioannes, who died young. The couple later divorced for unspecified reasons. On 16 June 1895, Demetrius married his second wife, Euthymia Samothrakis, in Ermoupoli on Syros. Demetrius' insistence that his marriage registration should bear his imperial title led to a lengthy legal process with the Court of Appeals of Athens, which on 27 December 1895 at last ruled in his favor.

Demetrius died in Ermoupoli on 2 September 1902. His death certificate styled him as "Prince Demetrios Johannes Rhodokanakis". In addition to being remembered as an impostor and forger, Rhodocanakis has also been noted in later scholarship as a bibliophile, owning a large personal library (claimed by himself as consisting of tens of thousands of volumes but in reality only just about three thousand nine hundred).

== See also ==
- Succession to the Byzantine Empire
