= Combley Manor =

Combley Manor is a manor house on the Isle of Wight, situated in the parish of Arreton. It lies in the low ground to the north of Arreton Down, and mostly consists of woodland and pasture. Its first appearance is in a deed (c. 1230) between its then owner Simon Fitz Hubert and the convent of Quarr exchanging it for the somewhat insignificant holding of Blackland. It remained in the possession of Quarr Abbey, until its dissolution, but does not appear as a manor till quite late in the 15th century; indeed, in the valuation of Quarr Abbey lands in 1536 it is entered as 'a farm called Combley in Atherton parish.' In February 1537 Combley, called a manor, was granted in fee to Thomas Wriothesley, and it subsequently followed the same descent as Haseley.
