= Eugenie Paleologue =

Maltese pretender to the throne of Greece and the Byzantine Empire

- Born: c. 1849; Malta
- Died: 27 August 1934 (aged 86); South Kensington, London, United Kingdom
- Burial place: West Norwood Cemetery, London, United Kingdom
- Occupation: Pretender
- Father: Theodore Paleologo

Eugenie Wickham (Note: Her full name was Marie Ersilie Eugenie Orades Laurentia Vincenza Nicola Antonia Paleologue.) (née Paleologue; c. 1849 – 27 August 1934), self-styled as Princess Eugenie Nicephorus Comnenus Palaeologus, was a Maltese pretender to the throne of Greece and the Byzantine Empire, active in the early 20th century. For most of her life, at least from the early 1860s onwards, Paleologue lived in Great Britain, from the late 1860s onwards in London. She was noted for her great generosity, despite not being rich, as well as her repeated attempts at becoming a sovereign in Greece.

At different times, through invented descent from the Palaiologos dynasty of Byzantine emperors, she laid claim to Constantinople, the Kingdom of Greece and the islands of the Aegean Sea. In 1913, Paleologue managed to form an all-female committee of supporters who petitioned for her to be installed as "Empress of Constantinople" in the aftermath of the First Balkan War, which though unsuccessful garnered her some media attention.

== Biography ==
=== Early life ===
Marie Ersilie Eugenie Orades Laurentia Vincenza Nicola Antonia Paleologue was born on Malta in about 1849. She was the daughter of the Maltese pretender Theodore Palaeologo (or Theodore Attardo di Cristoforo de Bouillion), who lived in London and also claimed the style "Prince Nicephorus Comnenus Palaeologus", and his wife Laura Attardo Testaferrata (both died 1912). By 1861 Paleologue had left Malta, moving to Britain, as she is then recorded to have lived in St Davids in Pembrokeshire, Wales.

In 1869, Paleologue married Colonel Edmund Hill Wickham (1842–1907), who served in the Royal Artillery, and thereafter settled in England. She was recorded in documentation of the marriage as "Eugeniue Attard". Paleologue and Wickham, and their children, lived together in Fulham, London.

=== Pretensions ===
Though the last confidently verified members went extinct in the 16th century, Paleologue claimed direct descent from the Palaiologos dynasty, the last ruling dynasty of the Byzantine Empire. According to Paleologue, she was a descendant of Emperor John VIII Palaiologos (r. 1425–1448), otherwise regarded to have been childless, as well as of Constantine the Great (r. 306–337). Through her claimed descent, Paleologue claimed not only the style of "Princess", which she frequently used, but also claimed to be "empress by heredity".

Paleologue claimed to have been received with royal honours during a visit to Greece in 1898, at the time under the rule of King George I. In 1899, a claim circulated that the Holy Synod, the highest authority of the Russian Orthodox Church, recognised Paleologue as legitimate, according her the style "imperial highness", and promised that a pension would henceforth be paid to her by the Russian government. It was further claimed that her eldest son, Edmund Theodore Eugene, was recognised as the "future protector of the glorious traditions of the Orthodox Byzantine Empire". The announcement of the Holy Synod's recognition was published in The Genealogical Magazine, though the editors noted that they were unaware of where the claim had originated and were "much inclined to doubt" its "technical and official accuracy". The claim was also published in the international press, for instance being published without any doubts concerning its veracity in the French Annuaire de la noblesse de France in 1900.

After the death of her husband in 1907, Paleologue moved to West Kensington, also in London. In 1909, Paleologue claimed the official style "Hereditary Princess of Mytilene, Enos, Chios and Lemnos". She claimed in that year to have been approached about the possibility of making her the "Queen of Samos" (the island was at the time an autonomous Ottoman tributary state), or in the event that she did not become queen to make one of her sons king. Paleologue further stated in an interview with the Daily Express that making her the ruler of Samos would only be a step towards her rightful position as a "direct descendant of Constantine the Great". She further claimed that many Greeks saw her as "the one who is referred to in the old prophecy, that someone shall arise to bring power and prosperity to Greece again."

On 5 January 1913, during the First Balkan War, Paleologue officially put forth a claim on "the throne of Constantinople". As part of her claim, Paleologue had successfully formed an all-female committee of supporters, composed of several women from England and the United States and headed by Katherine R. Todd Appleton, a Chicago woman also at the time known for leading an international campaign for the safe-guarding of American girls abroad, as its chairman. According to Appleton, she and the other women of the committee had decided to support Paleologue and her claim to Constantinople " because her claim is just and reasonable and because her elevation to the throne of a small buffer state with Constantinople as its capital seems to be the most practical and feasible solution of the present problem". If the great powers involved in the peace talks of the war were not interested in granting her Constantinople, Paleologue at least urged that they grant her control of the isles of the Aegean Sea. Though they garnered some international attention in the media, nothing ultimately came of these petitions. Paleologue would at points through her claimed descent also stress a claim to the Kingdom of Greece. Though she was less vocal about these claims later in life, they were never entirely abandoned.

=== Later life and death ===
In April to May 1929, Paleologue was involved in a court case against George Stanley Brighten, a solicitor and Paleologue's trustee, appointed as such in the will of Paleologue's mother. The two had formerly been close friends and confidants, but Brighten now claimed that Paleologue owed him £779 as a balance of fees for a number of transactions he had carried out. Paleologue denied these claims and instead claimed that despite being her trustee, Brighten had never rendered her any account and that he owed her £4354. According to Brighten, Paleologue was "as improvident as though the wealth of the Byzantine emperors had descended to her"; stating that she was so generous that she could never refuse requests for her assistance. As a result, her house was apparently often a refuge for people who were not well off, including, at times, members of her own family. According to Brighten, he had been used as a buffer and bulwark against Paleologue's family, as she was unable to refuse them herself. Brighten stated that he essentially acted as her banker and that he in fact had established a joint account with her, so that she at times could answer to the demands of her family. Living with Paleologue at this time were her daughter Laura, Laura's husband Stair Francis Barton Dalrymple-Hay, and their son Christopher Dalrymple-Hay. Christopher was then married to Helen Viola Grierson. In previous letters to Brighten, Paleologue had expressed dismay in the way these three treated her, referring to them as "the unholy trinity" and lamenting that they were "always sponging" on her and bullying her. During the court case she denied ever having used the phrase "unholy trinity", even after being presented with the letter in question. The court ruled in Brighten's favour.

Paleologue was ill for most of the last several years of her life, being nursed by the wife of her grandson Christopher. During the last four of five months of her life she remained completely bedridden in her home at 33 Collingham Place, South Kensington in London. She died on 27 August 1934, having outlived her husband and four of her five children. Obituaries were printed in several newspapers, stating that while not rich, Paleologue was extremely generous, which often led her to become a victim of fraudsters, such as in an incident in 1931 when a man who pretended to befriend her ended up stealing and selling some of her furniture. Paleologue received an impressive funeral service on 30 August, conducted at Saint Sophia Cathedral in Bayswater by Archimandrite James Virvos. Apart from those conducting the service, the funeral was attended by thirteen people, including her daughter and son-in-law, as well as her grandson Christopher and his wife. She was buried in West Norwood Cemetery in London, where her husband and two of their sons, as well as Paleologue's possible parents (Theodore and Laura) are also buried. Her tombstone proclaims her to have been a "descendant of the Grecian Emperors of Byzantium".

== Children ==
With her husband Edmund Wickham, Eugenie had five children, born between 1872 and 1884. Though the tombstone of the fourth child, Constantine Douglas Clephane, calls him "Constantine Douglas Prince Palaeologus" and his three brothers are collectively recorded on their memorial stone as "princes of the house of Palaeologus", other surviving records indicate that they themselves preferred to use the surname "Cristoforo de Bouillon Wickham".

- Laura Mary Edith Catherine de Bouillion Wickham (1872–?), married Lieutenant Colonel Stair Francis Barton Dalrymple-Hay in 1893, through whom Eugenie had a single grandson; Lieutenant Commander Christopher Montague Vernon Francis Dalrymple-Hay, (1896–1944). Christopher served as a submarine captain in the World War I, and then commanded the naval landing of the Canadian force at Salerno (Operation Avalanche) in the World War II and received several awards, both military and humanitarian.
- Edmund Theodore Eugene di Cristoforo de Bouillon Wickham (1875–1918), a major in the British army. Died at Fulham from injuries sustained in World War I.
- Montague Hill Clephane di Cristoforo de Bouillon Wickham (1878–1915), a captain in the British army. Died in France during World War I.
- Constantine Douglas ("Diggie") Clephane de Cristoforo de Bouillon Wickham (1880–1900), drowned in Teddington in 1900.
- Clyde de Cristoforo de Bouillon Wickham (1884–1923), died in Fulham in 1923.
