= Succession to the Byzantine Empire =

Claims to Byzantine legacy and inheritance

Since its fall, the issue of succession to the Byzantine Empire has been a major point of contention both geopolitically, with different states laying claim to its legacy and inheritance, and among the surviving members of the Byzantine nobility and their descendants. Historically, the most prominent claims have been those of the Ottoman Empire, which conquered Byzantium in 1453 and ruled from its former capital, Constantinople; the Russian Empire, as the most powerful state practising Eastern Orthodox Christianity; and various nobles and figures in Western Europe of increasingly spurious and questionable imperial descent.

Constantinople fell to the Ottoman Empire on 29 May 1453, with the last emperor, Constantine XI Palaiologos, dying in the fighting. The Byzantine Empire was the medieval continuation of the ancient Roman Empire, its capital having been transferred from Rome to Constantinople in the 4th century by Rome's first Christian emperor, Constantine the Great. Though hereditary succession was often the norm, the Byzantine Empire was rooted in the bureaucracy of Ancient Rome, rather than the typical Western European ideas of hereditary inheritance. The accession of a new ruler was often a complex process and the empire lacked formal succession laws. Succession through illegitimate descent, adoption, or usurpation was not considered illegal and the rightful ruler was usually considered to be whoever was in possession of Constantinople at any given time. Most of the empire's prominent dynasties were founded through usurpation of the throne. As such, the Ottoman sultan Mehmed II, who had conquered Constantinople, proclaimed himself as the new emperor, as Kayser-i Rûm, in the aftermath of the conquest.

The Ottoman claim was not accepted internationally. Through marriage with the Palaiologos dynasty and through ruling the most powerful state adhering to the Eastern Orthodox Church, Russia historically also laid claim to succeed the Byzantine Empire, a claim the Russians attempted to enforce several times in the numerous Russo-Turkish wars. In the aftermath of 1453, those among the Byzantine nobility who had escaped the Ottoman conquest mainly looked to the surviving members of the Palaiologos dynasty as prospective emperors, with it being suggested by some to crown Demetrios Palaiologos (1407–1470), Constantine XI's brother, who ruled in the Morea. Demetrios was reluctant and was captured by the Ottomans in 1460. In 1483, Constantine XI's nephew, Andreas Palaiologos (1453–1502), in exile in Italy, proclaimed himself as the rightful emperor.

The last documented and verified legitimate male-line descendants of the Palaiologoi died out in the early 16th century with the death of the last Marquess of Montferrat of this line in 1533, but that did little to stop forgers, pretenders, impostors and eccentrics from claiming descent from the ancient emperors, not only the Palaiologoi but also earlier ruling dynasties of the empire, several of which did have descendants living beyond 1453. In cases, claimants and forgers claimed the imperial title itself. Some families gained relatively widespread recognition, such as the Angelo Flavio Comneno, supposed descendants of the Angelos dynasty. Some Byzantine claimants are still active today, despite the lack of formal Byzantine succession laws making finding a legitimate heir impossible. Such figures have often been accompanied by invented chivalric orders, typically with fabricated connections to the Byzantine Empire, despite the fact that chivalric orders were completely unknown in the Byzantine world. The last pretender to achieve significant recognition was the 19th-century forger Demetrius Rhodocanakis (1840–1902), though several less successful forgers and impostors have also appeared since his time. More sound claims to the Palaiologoi inheritance were grounded on legal, rather than genealogical, inheritance as well as on matrilineal descent. From the 16th century until their extinction in 1884, the Tocco family, the seniormost female-line descendants of Thomas Palaiologos, the father of Andreas Palaiologos, laid claim to represent the legitimate Byzantine imperial dynasty, though they did not claim any imperial titles. From 1494 to 1566, the kings of France publicly claimed to be the titular emperors of Constantinople on the grounds that Charles VIII of France had been sold the title by Andreas Palaiologos in 1494, though Andreas had later considered this sale invalid.

== Byzantine succession practices ==
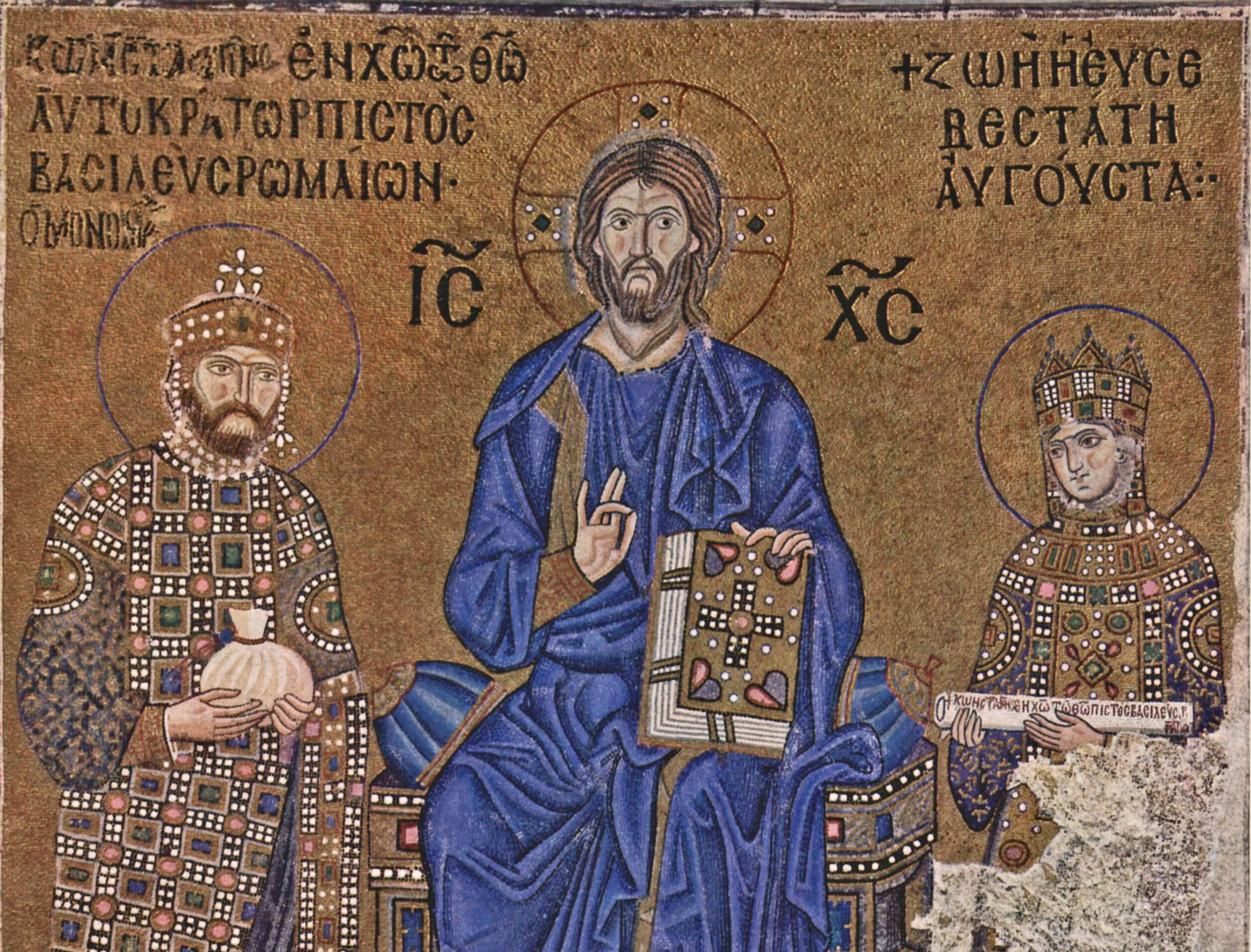
11th century Hagia Sophia mosaic depicting Emperor Constantine IX Monomachos (left), Jesus Christ (center), and Empress Zoë Porphyrogenita (right). On the left, Constantine is identified as "faithful in Christ the God, Emperor of the Romans".

The Byzantine Empire was the medieval continuation of the ancient Roman Empire, with its capital having been transferred from Rome to Constantinople in the 4th century by Rome's first Christian emperor, Constantine the Great. The term "Byzantine" is an historiographical exonym: the people in the empire continually self-identified as "Romans" and referred to their empire as the "Roman Empire" throughout its existence.

As the successor of the ancient Roman emperors, the power of the Byzantine emperor (officially titled the "Emperor of the Romans"; in later times the "Emperor and Autocrat of the Romans") was nearly absolute; being the supreme judge, the sole legitimate legislator, the highest military commander and the protector of the Christian church. In Ancient Rome, before Christianization, the emperors were proclaimed as divine figures in their own right through the imperial cult, meaning that religious and political obedience were turned into the same thing. After Christianization, the absolute nature of imperial rule remained justified through the idea that the emperor, though no longer divine himself, was the divinely sanctioned ruler on Earth, on behalf of Jesus Christ. The emperor's role as the ruler of the Roman Empire and the leader of Christianity remained unquestioned within the empire itself until its fall. As such, Byzantine imperial ideology was simply an evolution of that of Ancient Rome. The Byzantines held the emperor to be dependent on no one when exercising his theoretically unlimited power, not accountable to anyone but God himself. The emperor's role as a divine viceroy of Earth meant that emphasis was placed on the emperor being physically perfect: deformities and certain conditions could make a candidate unsuitable for rule. Notably, blindness was typically seen as rendering an heir unsuitable, which is why many contenders for the throne were blinded throughout Byzantine history.

As the imperial office of Byzantium was an evolution of that of Ancient Rome, it was rooted in the bureaucracy of the Roman Republic rather than typical Western European ideas of hereditary monarchies. As a result, there were no formal succession laws in the empire and the rise of a new ruler was often a complex process. There was a senate in Constantinople, ostensibly the continuation of the ancient Roman Senate, but it had little real influence, only potentially playing an important role in the aftermath of the deaths of emperors, when it theoretically held the power to appoint the next ruler. The senate's role in the process wasn't as decisive as it had been in some portions of ancient Roman history; the dead emperor had often designated a successor in his lifetime, often even crowning his designated heir as co-emperor, and thus ratification by the senate was only a formality. If there was no clear designated successor, the succession often came down to either senatorial or (more frequently) military support. Having been acclaimed co-emperor was also not a sure way of eventually becoming the sole ruling emperor. It was common for co-emperors to be blinded or killed once the power of their senior co-ruler had been compromised. Imperial children proclaimed as co-emperors that were still infants at the time of their father's death were often deposed or killed. The complex succession practices, and the threat of a general being proclaimed as emperor by the army, often resulted in civil war.

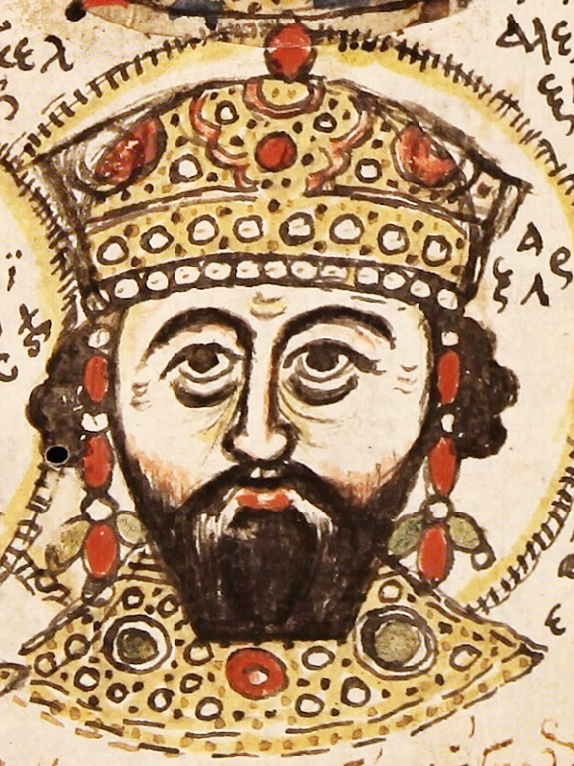
Alexios III Angelos (r. 1195–1203, pictured) usurped the throne from his brother Isaac II but was not considered an illegitimate ruler since the Byzantine Empire lacked formal succession laws.

In the ancient Roman Empire, the imperial throne tended to be passed on through dynastic succession, but only if a reasonable dynastic candidate existed and could garner enough support and loyalty from the bureaucrats and generals of the empire. As an example, Emperor Jovian (r. 363–364) left two sons who were passed over after his death. Upon the death of Eastern emperor Valens in 378, his nephews Valentinian II and Gratian, who ruled in the west, were deemed too young to rule the east as well and the unrelated Theodosius I was proclaimed Eastern emperor. Likewise, succession in the later Byzantine Empire was also often de facto hereditary, with emperors crowning their sons as co-emperors for generations to ensure their inheritance, leading to the creation of dynasties. At times when the empire was stable and at peace, succession through primogeniture (eldest son inherits) was the custom, if the emperor had a son it was expected that this son would inherit imperial power, but while this practice had been largely de facto adopted by the Middle Ages, there were several exceptions and it had not been formally codified as law. Though the vast majority of emperors were male, men and women were theoretically equally eligible for the throne (there were three ruling empresses; Irene, Zoë, and Theodora, and numerous powerful female regents, such as Eudokia), and a ruling emperor did not necessarily have to raise their oldest son to be co-emperor, but could designate whichever son deemed the most fit to be successor. Some preference was often granted to children born after their parents had become emperors, who were designated as porphyrogenitus ("born in the purple"). In some cases, illegitimate children rose to the throne and in other cases, emperors adopted heirs with whom they had no relation at all.

The lack of formal hereditary succession in the Byzantine Empire was clearly illustrated during the events of the Fourth Crusade in 1202–1204, when Crusaders arrived at Constantinople with the aim of placing Alexios IV Angelos on the throne of the Byzantine Empire. Alexios IV's father Isaac II had been deposed by his brother (and Alexios IV's uncle), Alexios III, in 1195. Although Alexios IV would have been the rightful heir of Isaac II from the perspective of the Crusaders from Western Europe, the citizens of the empire itself were unconcerned with his cause as Alexios III, according to their own customs, was not an illegitimate ruler in the way he would have been in the West. Of the 94 emperors who reigned from Constantinople's proclamation as Roman capital in 330 to the city's fall in 1453, 20 had started their careers as usurpers. Because obtaining the throne through usurpation wasn't seen as illegitimate, revolts and civil wars were frequent in the empire; more than thirty of its emperors had to face large-scale revolts against their rule. Many of the empire's most prominent dynasties, including the Macedonian, Komnenos, Angelos and Palaiologos dynasties, were all founded through usurpers seizing power by displacing a previous ruling dynasty. Because of the complex succession practices of the Byzantine Empire, each emperor could in some way be seen as having founded a new imperial dynastic line. This makes any attempt at determining a "rightful heir" to the Byzantine Empire impossible, especially given that descent through adoption or illegitimate birth would not have barred a Byzantine noble from assuming the throne.

== Claims of imperial succession ==
=== Ottoman Empire ===
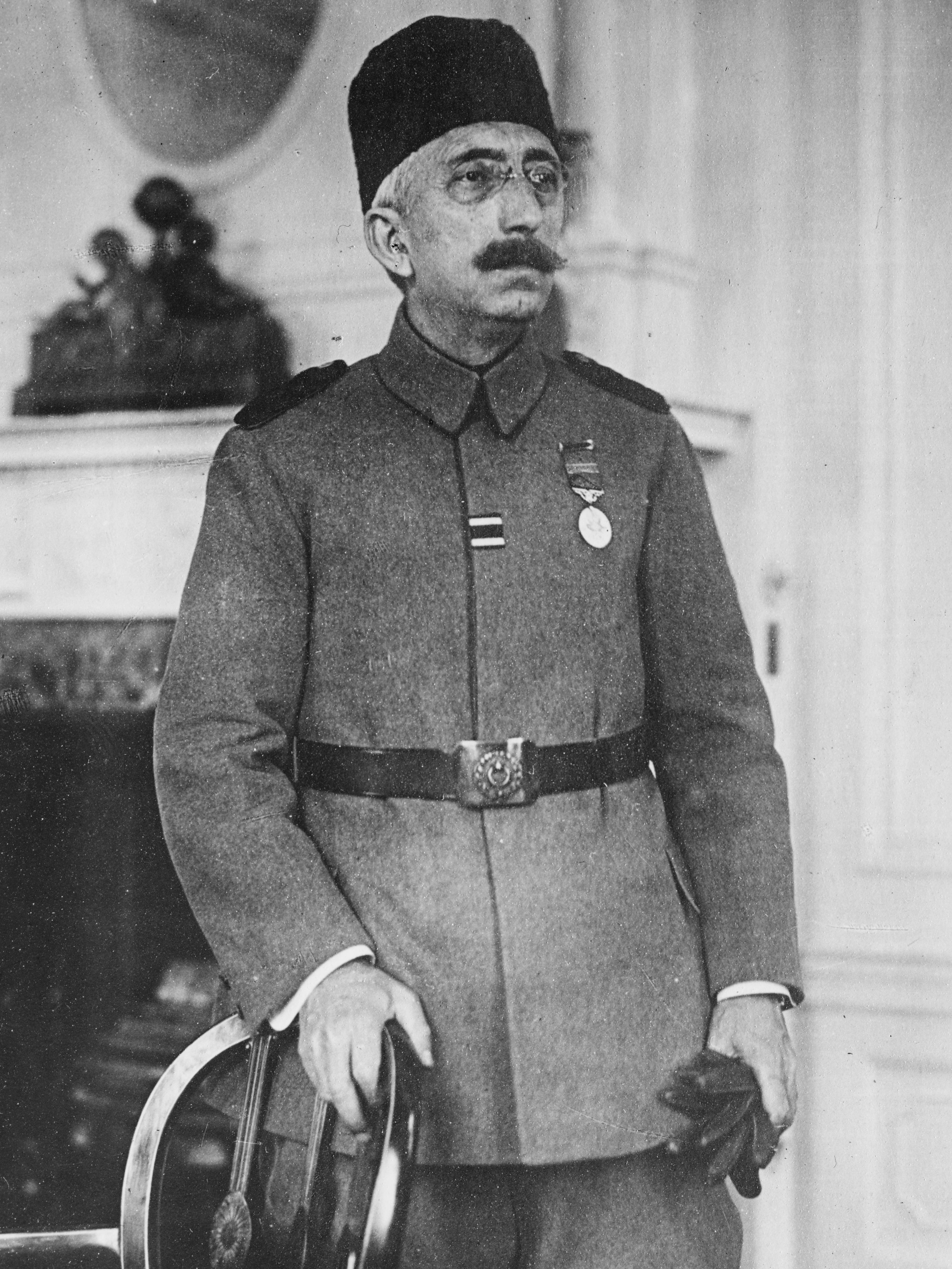
Mehmed VI (r. 1918–1922), the last sultan of the Ottoman Empire

In the aftermath of Constantinople's fall and the death of the final emperor, Constantine XI Palaiologos, in the fighting, Constantinople's conqueror, Sultan Mehmed II of the Ottoman Empire, assumed the title Kayser-i Rûm (Caesar of the Roman Empire), portraying himself as the successor of the Byzantine emperors. Contemporaries within the Ottoman Empire recognized Mehmed's assumption of the imperial title. The historian Michael Critobulus described the sultan as "emperor of emperors", "autocrat" and "lord of the Earth and the sea according to God's will". In a letter to the doge of Venice, Mehmed was described by his courtiers as the "Emperor". Other titles were sometimes used as well, such as "grand duke" and "prince of the Turkish Romans". The citizens of Constantinople and the former Byzantine Empire (which would still identify as "Romans" and not "Greeks" until modern times) saw the Ottoman Empire as still representing their empire; the imperial capital was still Constantinople (and would be until the end of the Ottoman Empire in the 20th century) and its ruler, Mehmed II, was the emperor.

In addition to being the direct geopolitical successors of the Byzantine Empire, the Ottomans also claimed Byzantine ancestry from at least the 16th century onwards, claiming that Ertuğrul, the father of the Ottoman dynasty's founder Osman I, was the son of Suleyman Shah, who was in turn supposedly the son of John Tzelepes Komnenos, a renegade prince of the Komnenos dynasty and a grandson of Emperor Alexios I. Due to the chronological distance between some of the supposed ancestors, this particular line of descent is unlikely and the supposed Komnenid ancestry was probably created as a legitimizing device in regards to the many Eastern Orthodox Christians the Muslim Ottomans ruled.

Mehmed took many steps to legitimise his rule as the new emperor; he made Constantinople his capital, promoted many Greeks to elite government positions, modified his court ceremonies and protocols so that they more closely resembled those of Byzantium, and he appointed a new patriarch of Constantinople, Gennadius. Though the title was seldom used after Mehmed's reign, the Ottoman sultans maintained that they were the successors of the Byzantine (and by extension, Roman) emperors. In international diplomacy, they (like the Byzantine emperors before them) refused to recognise the rulers of the Holy Roman Empire as emperors, instead titling them as kıral (kings) of Vienna or Hungary. The 1533 Treaty of Constantinople between Sultan Suleiman I and Holy Roman Emperor Charles V explicitly forbade any of its signatories to refer to anyone but the Ottoman sultan as an emperor. Suleiman is recorded to (in addition to sultan) have titled himself as, among other titles, the "Emperor of Constantinople and Trebizond". Though the Holy Roman emperors had by that point recognised the Ottoman sultans as emperors for almost a century, the Ottomans did not recognise the Holy Roman emperors in turn until the 1606 Peace of Zsitvatorok wherein Sultan Ahmed I for the first time in his empire's history formally referred to the Holy Roman Emperor Rudolf II as a padishah (emperor).

=== Russia ===
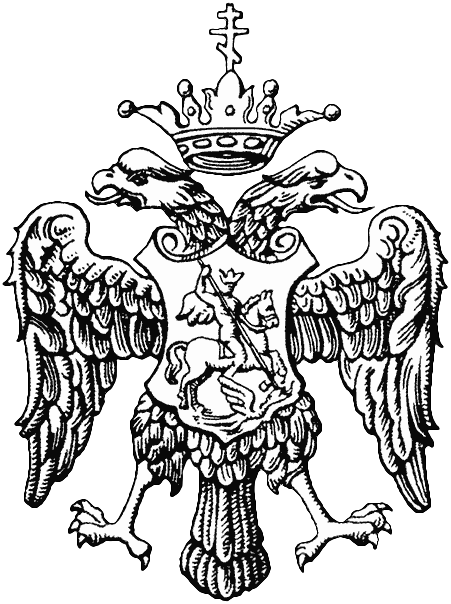
Coat of arms of Ivan the Terrible, Tsar of Russia, incorporating the double-headed imperial eagle

The Ottoman Empire's claim to succeed the Byzantine Empire as the heirs to the Roman imperial tradition in the east was challenged by the Grand Principality of Moscow, and later its successor, the Russian Empire. As the capital of the most powerful state adhered to the Eastern Orthodox Church, the city of Moscow was proclaimed by the Russians as the "third Rome". Developed by the abbot Philotheus of Pskov, the third Rome idea proclaimed that the first Rome (the city of Rome itself) had fallen to heresy (Catholicism) and the second Rome (Constantinople) to the infidel (Ottomans), but the third Rome (Moscow) would endure until the end of the world. Russia's claim was strengthened by the marriage of Grand Prince Ivan III to the niece of Constantine XI, Zoe Palaiologina. In 1561, the Patriarch of Constantinople blessed his right to the title of Ivan IV.

The "third Rome" idea and the marriage of Ivan III and Zoe made the Russian monarchs not only claimant successors of the Byzantine emperors, but also formal claimants to the throne in Constantinople, occupied by the Ottoman sultans. This created a distinct "dream of Constantinople" in Russia, with the ancient imperial city, which was called "Tsargrad" in Russia, being envisioned as the future centre of Russian power. Constantinople was considered the historical centre of Eastern Orthodox Christianity, and the many wars Russia fought against the Ottomans were propagandised as holy campaigns intended to "free the Orthodox world from the Muslim yoke". In addition to its symbolic value, Russia for centuries also wanted control of the straits around the city due to its key geopolitical position. Even after the direct line of descendants of Ivan III and Zoe died out in 1598, the rulers of Russia continued to link their imperial status to the relationship between their predecessors and the last Byzantine emperor.

Though Russia never captured Constantinople, there were several plans and attempts to do so. In the 18th century, Catherine the Great (r. 1762–1796) advanced the "Greek Plan", which would involve driving the Ottomans out of Europe, liberating the Christians in the Balkans, and setting up two new states in its place: a "Kingdom of Dacia" in the north and a restored Byzantine Empire in the south.

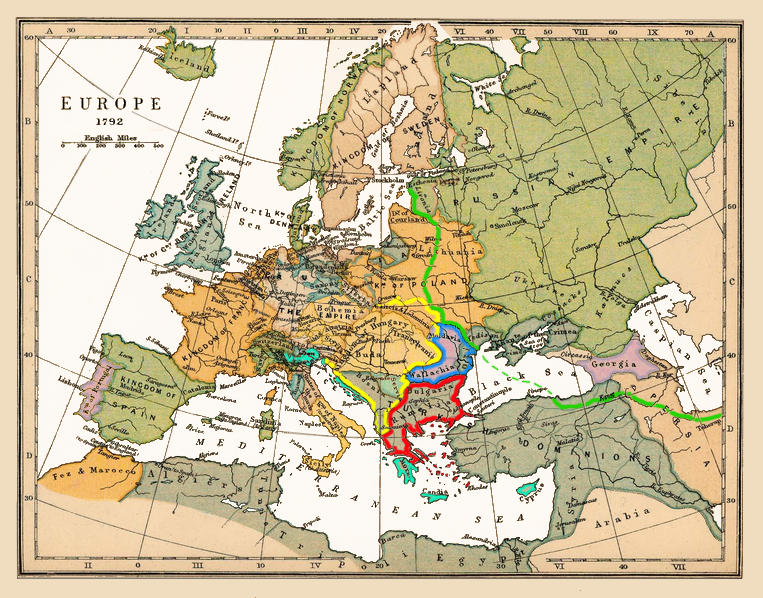
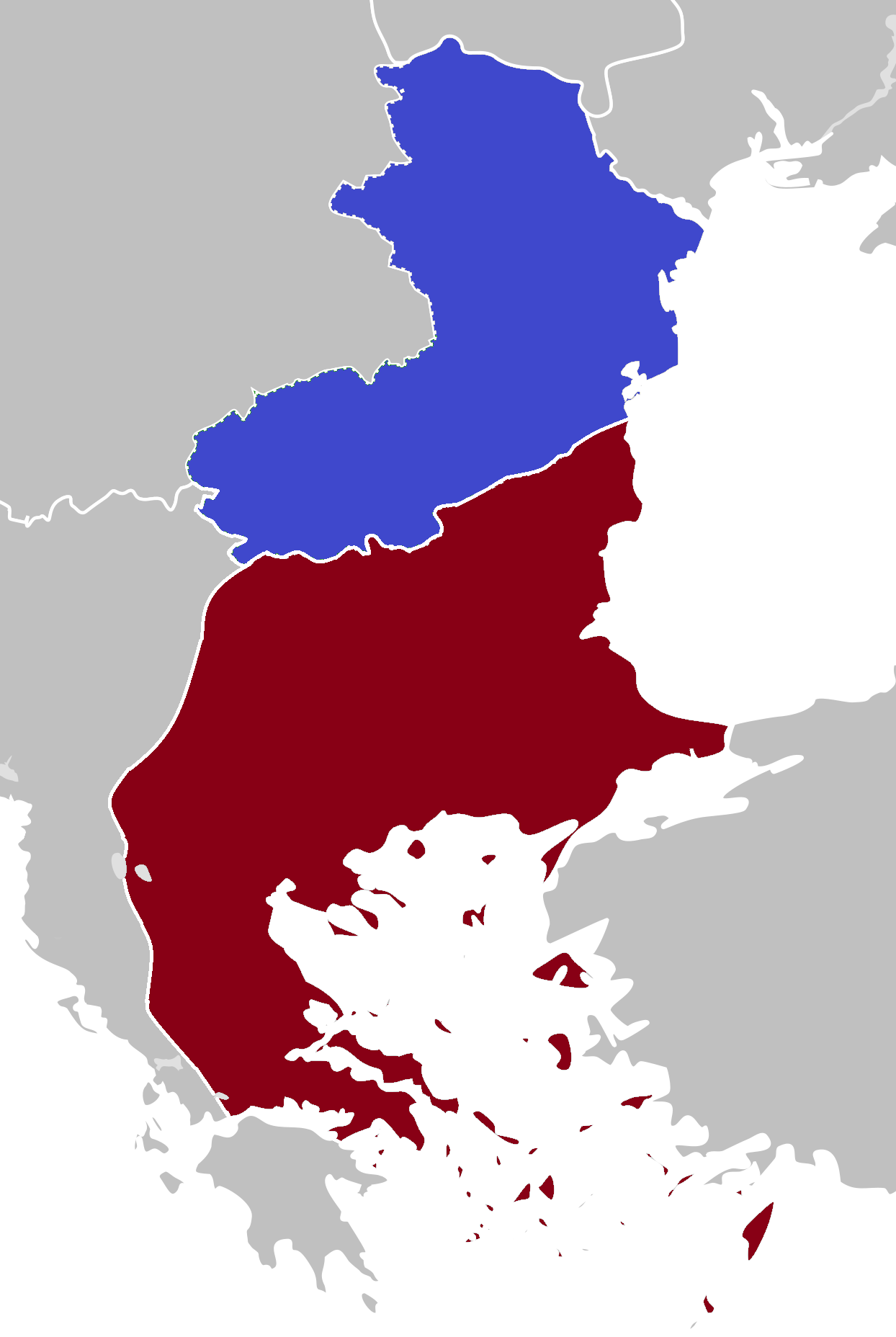
Left: Catherine the Great's "Greek Plan". Red marks the planned borders of the restored Byzantine Empire under her grandson Konstantin Pavlovich, blue marks the planned borders of the "Kingdom of Dacia" under Grigory Potemkin. The compensations for the Habsburg monarchy are marked with yellow and the compensations for Venice are marked with blue-green.
Right: Close-up of the intended approximate borders of the restored Byzantine Empire (red) and the Kingdom of Dacia (blue).

Catherine intended to place her grandson Konstantin Pavlovich on the throne of the restored empire, going as far as to name him after Byzantium's first and last emperors (had the plans succeeded, he would have been Emperor Constantine XII). To prepare Konstantin for his intended future role, she had him placed with Greek nurses and courtiers. By the time of her death, Catherine was poised to take Constantinople. She had annexed the Crimea and the northern coast of the Black Sea, built a navy equal to the size of the Ottoman navy, and an army of 300,000 soldiers, with another 50,000 in training, the most prepared Russia ever had been to strike at Constantinople. However, Catherine's plan had little support from other European countries, and her death in 1796 led to the project in the end being abandoned.

In the 19th century, Catherine's grandson, Emperor Nicholas I (r. 1825–1855), came close to making the Russian dream a reality. The Russian army invaded the Ottoman Empire during the Russo-Turkish War of 1828–29, and 1829, they entered the city of Adrianople, only 240 kilometres (150 miles) from Constantinople. It would have taken the Russian army only two days to reach the ancient imperial capital, and due to the state of the Ottoman army (exhausted and worn out), it is very likely that the Russians would successfully have captured Constantinople, had they tried. Instead of taking the city, Nicholas I made an advantageous peace deal with Sultan Mahmud II, which involved the Ottomans closing the straits around Constantinople to other countries, except Russia. Nicholas would later face much criticism at home concerning the decision to not take the city. It is probable that the major reason he did not wish to take Constantinople at this time was that it was unclear what Russia was to do with the city, had they taken it. Controlling the new lands in former Ottoman territory efficiently would have been impossible, given that Russia did not have enough resources to maintain them, and there would have been rebellion if the Russian army was left in Constantinople in poverty. More alarmingly, taking Constantinople and driving the Ottomans out of Europe would also have necessitated reshaping the borders in all of southeastern Europe. If this reconfiguration had been up to Russia alone, it could easily have led to large-scale conflicts given that other major powers such as France or England would have been unlikely to accept it.

The last time the Russian claim to Constantinople was nearly made a reality was in World War I. In 1915, the Allied Powers had made a secret agreement, the Constantinople Agreement, wherein France and Great Britain promised that the Russian Empire would receive the city and the surrounding lands. The agreement was rendered void with the Russian Revolution and Russian withdrawal from the war in 1917.

=== Greece ===
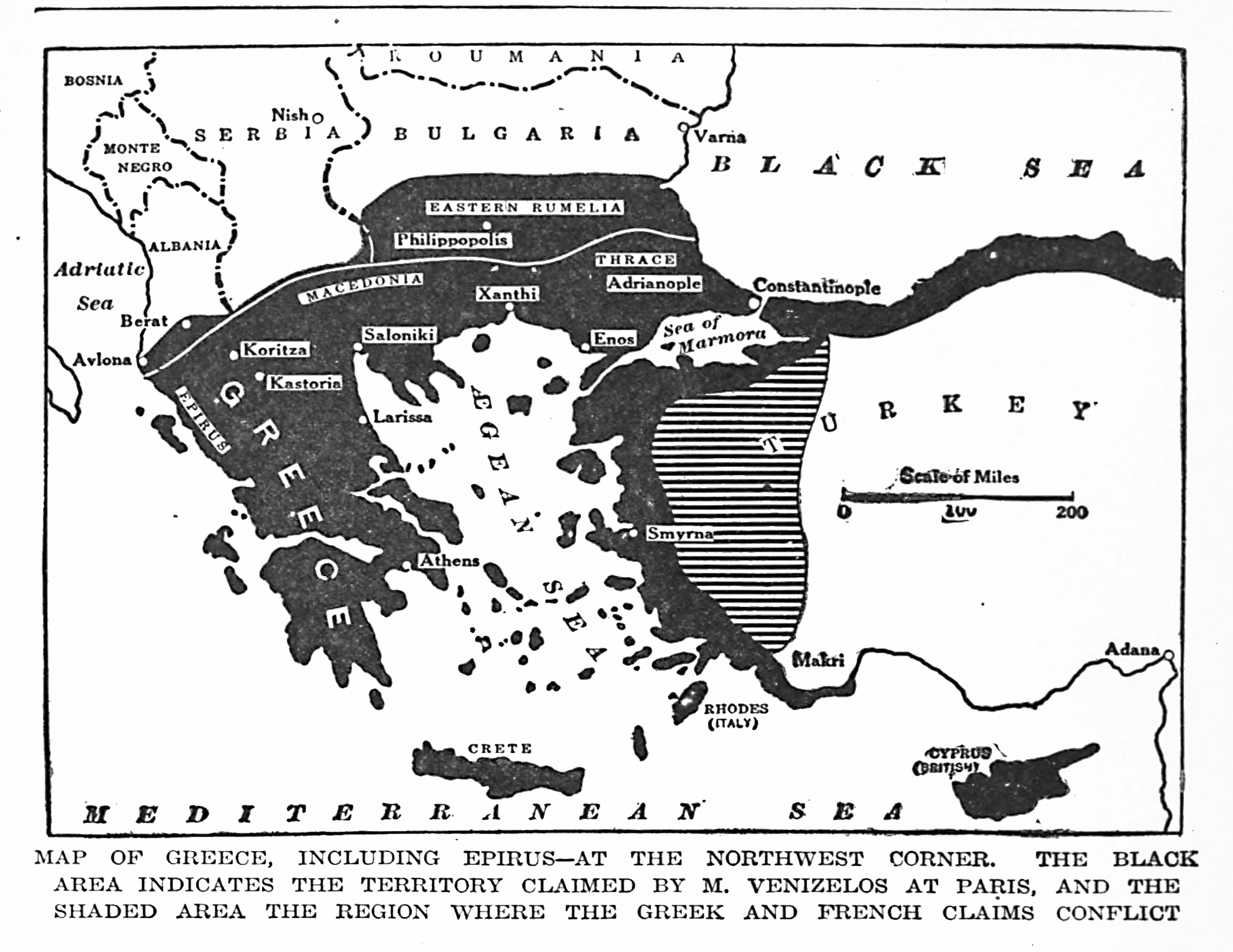
1919 map showing the Greek pretensions at the Paris Peace Conference after World War I

After the fall of the Byzantine Empire, the Greek-speaking Christian populace of the former empire continued to identify as Romans, rather than Greeks. The popular historical memory of these Romans was not occupied with the glorious past of the Roman Empire of old or the Hellenism in the Byzantine Empire, but focused on legends of the fall and the loss of their Christian homeland and Constantinople. One such narrative was the myth that Constantine XI would one day return from the dead to reconquer the city. In the centuries between the Fall of Constantinople and the Greek War of Independence (1821–1829), there was widespread hope and belief that the old empire would eventually be restored, or "resurrected". In the 17th century, the chronicler Paisios Ligarides wrote that "it is a great comfort to us thrice-miserable Romans to hear that there shall come a resurrection, a deliverance of our Genos". One prophecy held that the empire would be restored 320 years after Constantinople's conquest, in 1773, but when the ongoing Russo-Turkish war at that time fell short of prophetic expectations, many Greek chroniclers commented on their disappointment. Kaisarios Dapontes wrote that "the empire of the Romans will never be resurrected" and Athanasios Komninos-Ypsilantis wrote that "if therefore, in the time appointed by the prophecies, the Romans have not been liberated, then it will be very difficult for the resurrection of the Roman empire to take place".

Roman identity in Greece only lost ground by the time of the Greek War of Independence, when the term "Hellene" grew to replace it. The end of Roman identity in Greece was accelerated by several factors, notably the absence of the old Byzantine government to enforce it, the terms "Hellas" or "Greece" already being used internationally, and that the term "Roman" began to be associated with the Greeks that remained under Ottoman control, rather than those who were actively fighting for independence. In the eyes of the independence movement, a "Hellene" was a brave and rebellious freedom fighter while a "Roman" was an idle slave under the Ottomans. Though portions of Byzantine identity were preserved, notably a desire to take Constantinople itself, the name 'Hellene' fostered a fixation on more ancient (pre-Christian) Greek history and a negligence for other periods of the country's history (such as the Byzantine period).

In 1868, the King of the Hellenes, George I, named his firstborn son and heir Constantine. His name echoed the emperors of old, proclaiming his succession not just to the new Greek kings, but to the Byzantine emperors before them as well. Once he acceded to the throne as Constantine I of Greece, many in Greece hailed him as Constantine XII instead. Constantine I's conquest of Thessaloniki from the Turks in 1912 and his leadership in the Balkan Wars 1912–1913 was taken by some of the Greeks as evidence that the prophecy of Constantine XI's return and the reconquest of the Byzantine lands was about to be fulfilled. When Constantine was forced to abdicate in 1917, many believed he had been unjustly removed before completing his "sacred destiny". The hope of capturing Constantinople would not be completely dashed until the Greek defeat in the Greco-Turkish War in 1922.

== Claims to descent and inheritance ==
=== Heirs of the Palaiologoi emperors ===
==== Direct Palaiologoi heirs and claimants ====
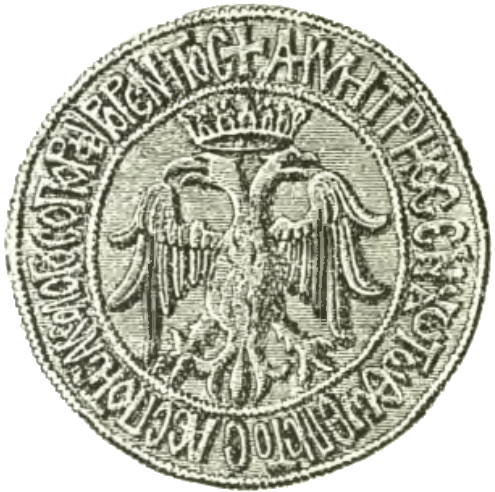
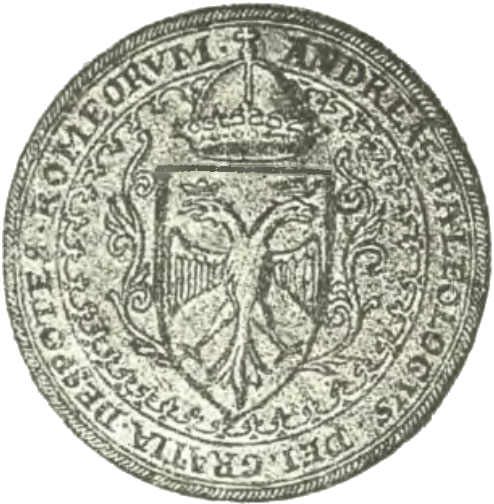
Seals of Demetrios Palaiologos (1407–1470, left) and Andreas Palaiologos (1453–1502, right)

The death of Constantine XI Palaiologos at Constantinople on 29 May 1453 did not mark the end of his family, the Palaiologos dynasty. In the aftermath of the city's fall, the threat of a military force uniting behind one of his surviving relatives and reclaiming Constantinople represented a real threat to the continued rule of Mehmed the Conqueror. Constantine did not have any children, but he did have surviving brothers, who represented the most prominent potential claimants to Byzantine imperial power. In the Peloponnese, Constantine's two brothers Demetrios (1407–1470) and Thomas Palaiologos (1409–1465) ruled as co-despots of the Morea. Though they were the most clear heirs, Demetrios and Thomas constantly bickered with each other and were unable to work together, ensuring that they would not represent a threat to Ottoman rule. Some of the more influential courtiers and refugees from Constantinople in the aftermath of 29 May raised the idea of proclaiming the elder brother Demetrios as the new emperor, in succession to Constantine, but Demetrios believed the wisest course of action was to instead placate the Ottomans and serve them as a vassal. Thomas, in sharp contrast to his older brother's policy, hoped to rally the papacy and western Europe into calling for a crusade to restore their empire. Tiring of the bickering of the brothers and the threat represented by Thomas's repeated appeals to the west, Mehmed invaded and seized the Morea in 1460, ending the despotate.

After the fall of the despotate, Demetrios was captured by the Ottomans and was forced to turn over his wife and daughter, Helena Palaiologina (1431–1469), to the sultan's harem. He was allowed to live out his life in relative comfort in Adrianople and eventually became a monk, dying in 1470. Helena had predeceased Demetrios and died without children of her own. The fate of Thomas was different, as he escaped to Italy with Venetian aid, settling in Rome after being rewarded with pensions and honours by the Pope. He spent much of the time until his death in 1465 travelling around Italy hoping to rally support for his cause. Thomas's eldest son, Andreas Palaiologos (1453–1502), actively aspired to restore the Byzantine Empire, proclaiming himself as not only the Despot of the Morea in 1465 in succession to his father, but also the rightful 'Emperor of Constantinople' in 1483, the first and only of the post-1453 Palaiologoi to do so. Little came of Andreas's dreams, he died poor in Rome in 1502, having twice given up his imperial (though not despotal) claims, first to Charles VIII of France in 1494 and later as part of his will, granting the titles to Isabella I of Castile and Ferdinand II of Aragon, and their descendants in perpetuity. Andreas is commonly believed not to have left any descendants, though it is possible that he had children. Figures that have been suggested to have been children of Andreas include Constantine Palaiologos, employed in the papal guard and dead in 1508, Maria Palaiologina, who married the Russian noble Prince Vasily Mikhailovich of Vereya-Belozersk, and Fernando Palaiologos, an obscure figure described as 'the son of the Despot of the Morea' and recorded to have adopted that title after 1502.

The second son of Thomas Palaiologos, Manuel Palaiologos (1455 – c. 1512), eventually returned to Constantinople, much to the surprise of people in Western Europe, and lived out his life under Ottoman rule, dying at some point during the reign of Sultan Bayezid II (r. 1481–1512). Manuel had at least two sons: John (who died young), and Andreas Palaiologos, named after Manuel's brother. Manuel's son Andreas is not believed to have had children of his own, and died at some point during the reign of Suleiman the Magnificent (r. 1520–1566). Andreas's death marks the end of the confidently verifiable imperial Palaiologos line, meaning that the last verified male-line Palaiologos descendants were extinct by the 16th century. Setton (1978) considered Demetrios Palaiologos to have been the head of the Palaiologos family 1453–1470, followed by Thomas's son Andreas Palaiologos from 1470 to 1502.

==== Matrilineal descent and other claims ====
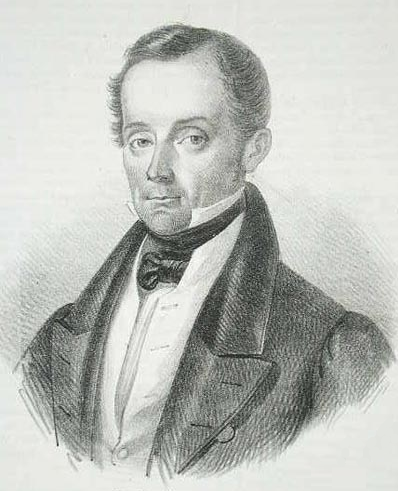
Portrait of Carlo III di Tocco Cantelmo Stuart (1827–1884), the last of the Tocco family

Descendants of the Palaiologoi emperors have survived through the centuries in the female line (matrilineally). Thomas Palaiologos had two daughters: Helena Palaiologina (1431–1473) and Zoe Palaiologina (c. 1449–1503). The eldest daughter, Helena, married Lazar Branković, Despot of Serbia, with whom she had three daughters; Jelena, Milica and Jerina Branković. The eldest daughter Jelena died childless, but the second daughter, Milica Branković, married Leonardo III Tocco, the ruler of the Despotate of Epirus, and had descendants. Beginning with Leonardo III's and Milica's son, Carlo III Tocco (1464–1518), who lived in exile in Italy after Epirus was conquered by the Ottomans, the Tocco family presented themselves as being the rightful Byzantine imperial dynasty. Carlo III is recorded in a text to have described himself as the heir of "the despots of Romania and Arta (Note: The modern rendition of the title of rulers of the Despotate of Epirus as 'Despot of Epirus' is a historiographical invention, with the title commonly being rendered as 'Despot of Romania' in contemporary times, 'Romania' meaning "land of the Romans" and being a common endonym for the Byzantine Empire. Arta was the capital of the Despotate of Epirus.) [and] the most serene houses of Serbia, Komnenoi and Palaiologoi, both imperial houses of Constantinople". The claim that they had succeeded the Palaiologoi in this role through inheritance did not change the titles claimed by the family, who still presented themselves as the titular despots of Epirus until the mid-17th century. In 1642, Antonio Tocco, great-great-grandson of Carlo III, ceased to claim the despotate and instead claimed the title of Prince of Achaea. This change in title is probably attributable to their Palaiologos ancestry, given that the wife of Thomas Palaiologos was Catherine Zaccaria, daughter and heir of Centurione II Zaccaria, the last Prince of Achaea. Through Thomas Palaiologos, the Tocco family thus represented the senior heirs to that title. The Tocco family went extinct in 1884 with the death of its final member, Carlo III di Tocco Cantelmo Stuart (1827–1884), though living descendants exist. Milica Branković also has living descendants through the third and youngest daughter, Jerina. Jerina married Gjon Kastrioti II, the son of Albanian national hero Skanderbeg, and the couple's descendants survive today as the modern Italian Castriota family.

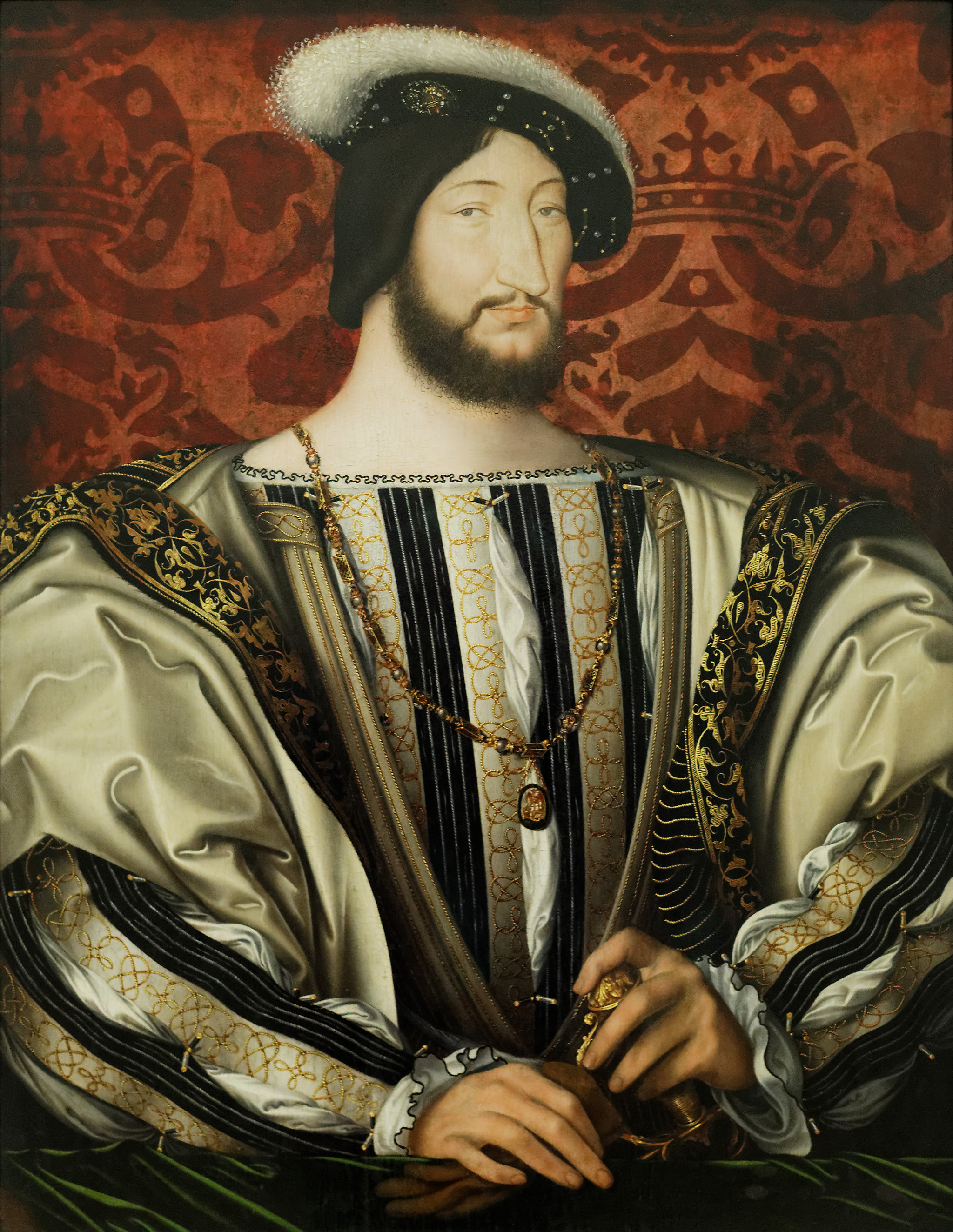
The kings of France, including Francis I (pictured), claimed to be titular emperors of Constantinople from 1494 until they abandoned their claim in 1566.

Thomas's younger daughter, Zoe, married Ivan III, the grand prince of Moscow, in 1472 and was thereafter renamed Sophia. From Ivan III onwards, the rulers of Russia represented the clearest and most public descendants of the Palaiologoi emperors. Upon his marriage to Zoe, Ivan informally declared himself tsar (emperor) of all the Russian principalities. In 1480, he stopped paying tribute to the Golden Horde and adopted the imperial double-headed eagle as one of his symbols. Zoe was the grandmother of Russian tsar Ivan the Terrible, making him a great-great-grandson of Byzantine emperor Manuel II Palaiologos. Zoe's direct line of descendants died out in 1598. The Romanov dynasty, which succeeded the Rurik dynasty and ruled Russia from 1613 to 1917, were not descended from Zoe, originating as in-laws, rather than descendants, of the Rurikids.

Some claims to Palaiologos inheritance have historically been forwarded by the Italian Gonzaga family. The Gonzaga are matrilineal descendants of the Palaeologus-Montferrat family, distant cousins of the last emperors. Their claims reached their height under Vincenzo II Gonzaga (1594–1627) and Charles I Gonzaga (1580–1637), both of whom aspired to lead crusades against the Ottomans to restore the Byzantine Empire and claim its throne for themselves.

On occasion, claims to the Palaiologos inheritance have been forwarded by nobility and royalty completely genealogically unconnected to the old dynasty. Andreas Palaiologos sold the title of 'Emperor of Constantinople', i. e. Byzantine emperor, to Charles VIII of France in 1494. As the sale was conditional on Charles conquering the Morea and granting it to Andreas, among other conditions, Andreas viewed the sale as having been rendered invalid upon the death of Charles VIII in 1498, and thus claimed the title again from that point onwards. Despite this, the kings of France after Charles VIII – Louis XII, Francis I, Henry II and Francis II – also continued to use imperial titles and honors. The effigy of Louis XII on his grave bears an imperial crown, rather than a royal one. When, ultimately fruitless, plans were being drawn up for a crusade in 1517, it was rumored that Pope Leo X's chosen candidate for the position of Emperor of Constantinople was Francis I of France. Francis I publicly stressed his claim to be the Emperor of Constantinople as late as 1532. Not until Charles IX in 1566 did the imperial claim come to an eventual end through the rules of extinctive prescription as a direct result of desuetude, or lack of use. Charles IX wrote that the imperial Byzantine title "is not more eminent than that of a king, which sounds better and sweeter". Isabella I of Castile and Ferdinand II of Aragon, who were willed the title by Andreas in 1502, never used the title and neither did any succeeding monarch of Spain. The Albanian pretender Constantine Arianiti claimed the title of 'Despot of Morea' upon Andreas's death in 1502, though it is unclear on what grounds, possibly through a spurious connection to the old Komnenos dynasty, or through his marriage to Francesca of Montferrat, an illegitimate princess of the House of Palaeologus-Montferrat.

==== Supposed lines of descent ====
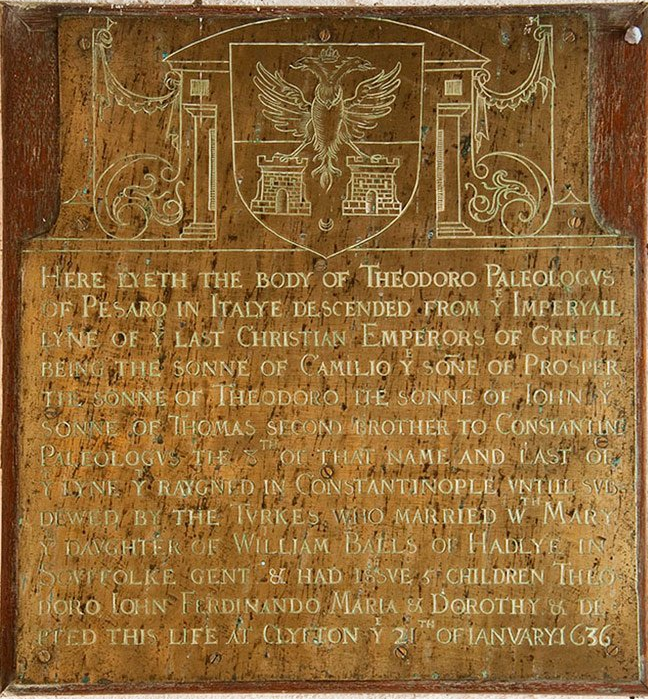
Tombstone of Theodore Paleologus (c. 1560–1636), possibly a descendant of Thomas Palaiologos

The probable extinction of the senior branch of the imperial Palaiologos family at some point in the 16th century did little to stop individuals in various parts of Europe from claiming descent from the old imperial dynasty. The name 'Palaiologos' had been widespread even before a branch of the family acceded to the imperial throne, with many unrelated nobles and landowners also bearing it by the time of Constantinople's fall. Byzantine genealogy is also made complicated by the fact that it was common in Byzantium to adopt the family name of your spouse or mother, if that was more prestigious. Many among the Byzantine nobility escaped to Western Europe as their empire crumbled, either before or after the Ottoman conquest of the Morea. Many Byzantine refugees legitimately bore the name Palaiologos, though they were unrelated to the imperial family itself. Because the name could lend whoever bore it prestige (as well as possible monetary support), many refugees fabricated closer links to the imperial dynasty. Many Western rulers were conscious of their failure to prevent Byzantium's fall and welcomed these men at their courts. Given that western Europeans were unaware of the intricacies of Byzantine naming customs, the name Palaiologos was understood in the west to mean the imperial dynasty. The effect of this was an extensive number of Palaiologos lineages in western Europe, whose relations to each other, and the imperial dynasty, are not entirely clear. One of the more plausible lineages was the Paleologus family from Pesaro, claiming descent from Thomas Palaiologos. This is attested in Italy, England and the Caribbean from the 16th century to the disappearance of its last known member, Godscall Paleologue, in the late 17th century. The Pesaro Paleologi left no known modern descendants.

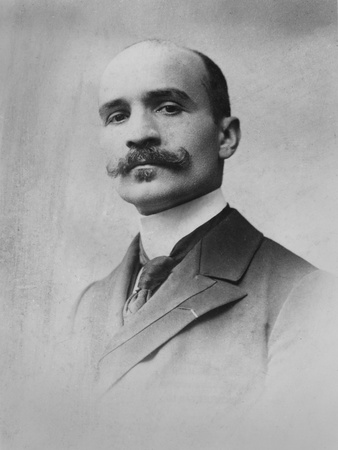
Maurice Paléologue (1859–1944), a French diplomat of Romanian descent who claimed imperial Palaiologos ancestry

Living families that claim direct imperial Palaiologos descent include the Palaiologoi of the island of Syros in Greece, which have historically claimed descent from a supposed son of Andronikos Palaiologos, one of Emperor Manuel II's sons. Given that Andronikos suffered from elephantiasis and epilepsy, and that he died at a young age, with no contemporary evidence for any children, it is unlikely that he has descendants. The Paleologu of Romania claims to descend from an otherwise unattested son of Theodore II Palaiologos, another son of Manuel II. The Paleologu also live in Malta and France, one of the most famous members of the family being the French diplomat Maurice Paléologue, who in his lifetime repeatedly asserted his imperial descent. The 20th-century pretender Paul Crivez claimed to be the rightful Byzantine emperor through adoption into the French branch of the family. The ancestry of the Paleologu can be traced to Greeks with the name Palaiologos, but not to the imperial family. In the 18th century, several Phanariots (members of prominent Greek families in the Fener quarter of Constantinople) were granted governing positions in the principalities of Wallachia and Moldavia (predecessors of Romania) by the Ottomans. The Phanariots sent to Wallachia and Moldavia included people with the last name Palaiologos, ancestors of the Paleologu family. It was usual among wealthy Phanariots of the time to assume Byzantine surnames and claim descent from the famous noble houses of their Byzantine past, making the authenticity of the descent of these Palaiologoi doubtful.

==== Forged connections ====
Several supposed Palaiologoi have been outright denounced as forgers throughout the centuries since the fall of the Byzantine Empire. The late 16th-century theologian Jacob Palaeologus, originally from Chios, travelled across Europe claiming to be a grandson of Andreas Palaiologos, though he does not appear to have garnered much acceptance. Jacob's increasingly heterodox views on Christianity eventually brought him into conflict with the Roman church; he was burnt as a heretic in 1585. A contemporary of Jacob, Panaiotus (also called Panagiotes) Palaeologus, referred to himself as a genuine member of the old imperial family and a "Prince of Lacedaemonia", though the authorities in Vienna convicted him as a forger.

In 1830, an Irish man by the name Nicholas Macdonald Sarsfield Cod'd, living in Wexford, petitioned George Hamilton-Gordon, the Earl of Aberdeen, and Henry John Temple, the Viscount of Palmerston, to press his "ancestral" claim on the newly created Kingdom of Greece, after the throne had been offered to and declined by Leopold I of Belgium. An obscure Irishman claiming the throne of Greece is noteworthy as actual European royalty were offered the title at the time, with many refusing to accept it due to the personal danger presented by becoming king of a new and war-torn country. Nicholas claimed descent not only from the final Palaiologoi but also from Diarmait Mac Murchada, a medieval King of Ireland. He created large and elaborate genealogies and referred to himself as the "Comte de Sarsfield of the Order of Fidelity Heir and Representative to his Royal Ancestors Constantines, last Reigning Emperors of Greece subdued in Constantinople by the Turks". After his claims were ignored by Hamilton-Gordon and Temple, Nicholas sent a letter to William IV, the King of the United Kingdom, and might have sent letters to Charles X, the King of France, Nicholas I, the Emperor of Russia, Frederick William III, the King of Prussia, and Gregory XVI, the Pope. None of them ever acknowledged his claims.

A wealthy 19th century Greek merchant by the name Demetrius Rhodocanakis, originally from Syros but living in London, styled himself as "His Imperial Highness the Prince Rhodocanakis" and actively sought support for his family's claim to not only be the legitimate grand masters of the Constantinian Order of Saint George, a Catholic knightly order with invented Byzantine connections, but also to be the rightful Byzantine emperors, through descent from the Paleologus family of Pesaro. Rhodocanakis published several fabricated, but extensive, genealogies to assert his descent and though his claims were eventually debunked by the French scholar Emile Legrand, Rhodocanakis had at that point already received recognition from several important parties, such as the Vatican and the British Foreign Office.

Though there had been a Greek delegation sent to Italy and England after the Greek War of Independence, in search for supposed heirs of the Byzantine emperors, they found no living heirs of their ancient emperors. The failure of this delegation to find living Palaiologoi did not stop further claimants from emerging in England. Upon the deposition of the first King of Greece, Otto, in 1862, a man by the name Theodore Palaeologo, probably from Malta but living in England, attempted to press his claim to the Greek throne. Theodore died in 1912, aged 89, and was probably related to the later pretender "Princess" Eugenie Paleologue, born in 1849 and dead in 1934 and described by her tombstone as a "descendant of the Grecian Emperors of Byzantium".

Peter Mills, an Englishman from Newport on the Isle of Wight, was the last in the long line of supposed Palaiologoi in England claiming imperial descent. He styled himself as "His Imperial Majesty Petros I, Despot and Autokrator of the Romans, The Prince Palaeologus" and claiming to be the Grand Master of the Constantinian Order of Saint George and the "Duke of the Morea". Mills often walked around the streets of Newport "with long flowing white hair, sandals but no socks and some sort of order or military award around his neck". When he died in 1988, his claim to the imperial throne was taken up by his second wife and widow who then assumed the title "Her Imperial Highness Patricia Palaeologina, Empress of the Romans". Although several newspapers, such as the Isle of Wight County Press, The Daily Telegraph and The Times, printed obituaries of Mills, identifying him as "His Imperial Highness Petros I Palaeologos", his own son Nicholas denounced the idea that their family were of imperial descent, calling his father's claims a "complete and utter sham" and hoped that "the ghost of Prince Palaeologus might now be buried once and for all".

An Italian physician named Pietro Paleologo Mastrogiovanni claimed descent from Thomas Palaiologos, the younger brother of Constantine XI Palaiologos, the last Byzantine emperor, alleging in a 1981 interview that from Thomas "the line of ancestors leads from father to firstborn son directly to me, over 16 generations". Mastrogiovanni's supposed branch of the Palaiologos dynasty, the "Mastrogiovanni", claims descent from a supposed son of Thomas called Rogerio or Ruggerio, supposedly born around 1430. This however, is likely an impossibility since Thomas' marriage took place the same year, and his eldest verified child, Helena, was born in 1431. This Rogerio was supposedly sent as a hostage to Alfonso the Magnanimous of Aragon and Naples. Supposedly, he was responsible for erecting the Spirito Santo church, which still stands, in Casalsottano, a hamlet of the Italian comune San Mauro Cilento. Rogerio was supposedly survived by his two children John (Giovanni) and Angela, with John allegedly being granted the feudal holdings of Perito and Ostigliano in Salerno. The name "Mastrogiovanni" was said to have originated from John's descendants adopting it in his honor. This supposed family history mainly derives from oral tradition, with few documents supporting it. None of the documents have been authenticated and there are several issues with the overall reconstruction of events and descent. Modern researchers overwhelmingly dismiss the existence of Rogerio as fantasy. Among the most damning evidence is Rogerio's clearly Italian (rather than Greek) first name, the unlikelihood of a potential imperial heir being kept as hostage in Italy and that there are no mentions of him in Byzantine records. The contemporary Byzantine historian George Sphrantzes, who described the life of Thomas Palaiologos in detail, wrote on the birth of Thomas' son Andreas Palaiologos on 17 January 1453 that the boy was "a continuator and heir" of the Palaiologan lineage, a phrase which makes little sense if Andreas was not Thomas' first-born son.

From 2017 onwards, Mastrogiovanni's claims as titular emperor and Grand Master of the Constantinian Order of Saint George have been maintained by his son, Giovanni Angelo, self-styled as "Giovanni XIII Paleologo" or "Giovanni Angelo XIII Paleologo Mastrogiovanni". Giovanni Angelo heads the "Union of Byzantine Aristocracy", a group which also includes other Byzantine forgers, such as Maria Eugenia Láscaris, a granddaughter of the Spanish Byzantine forger-pretender Eugenio Lascorz.

=== Descendants of other dynasties ===
In addition to the Palaiologoi, there were also living descendants of other past imperial families after 1453, such as the Komnenoi, Laskarids and Kantakouzenoi. After the fall of Constantinople, the Ottoman government began a campaign of either outright eliminating prominent potential claimants (for instance, there was a mass execution of members of the Kantakouzenos family in Constantinople in 1477), or carefully watching their activities. Some prominent members of the nobility successfully managed to escape the grasp of the Ottomans however, fleeing to western Europe. The existence of genuine male-line descendants of any Byzantine emperor today is considered doubtful.

==== Angelos dynasty ====
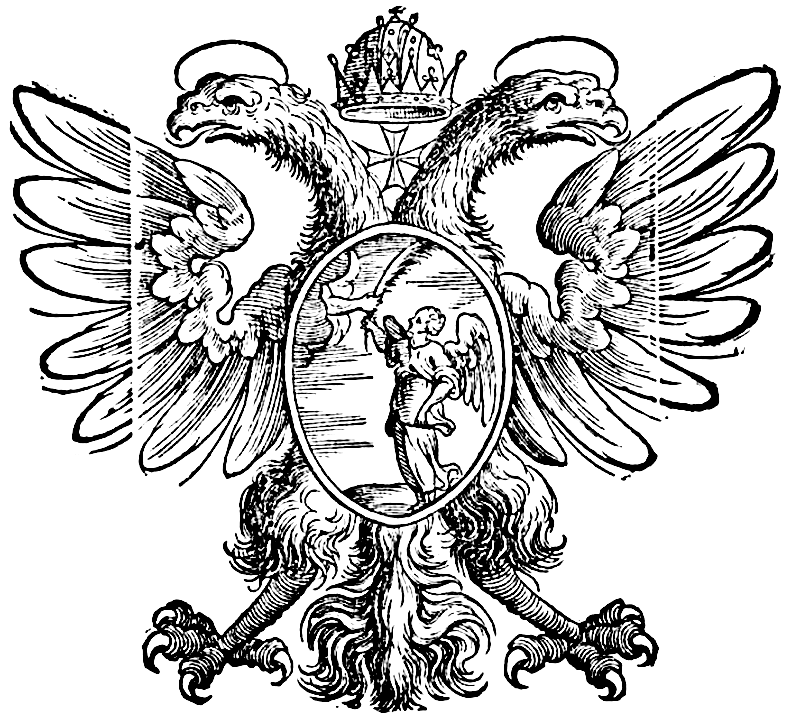
Coat of arms of the Angelo Flavio Comneno family, which claimed descent from the Angelos dynasty

The Angelos dynasty ruled the Byzantine Empire 1185–1204. In 1197, Irene Angelina, a daughter of Emperor Isaac II Angelos, married Philip of Swabia, King of the Romans, through which she is ancestral to many of the later royalty and nobility in Western Europe. Emperor Alexios III Angelos was ancestral to both the Laskaris and Palaiologos dynasties through his daughters. As the Angeloi were matrilineal descendants of Alexios I Komnenos, these lines of descent are also descended from the Komnenoi. Alexios III's death in 1211 extinguished the male line of the imperial Angelos dynasty. Later male-line Angeloi descended from John Doukas, uncle of Isaac II and Alexios III. John's descendants, who often preferred to use the name 'Komnenos Doukas' rather than 'Angelos', ruled Epirus and Thessaly until the 14th century. Among their last known recorded descendants were Michael Angelović (fl. 1451–73), a Serbian magnate, and Mahmud Pasha Angelović (1420–1474), who served as the Grand Vizier of the Ottoman Empire under Mehmed II 1456–1466 and 1472–1474.

The most public non-Palaiologos claimants to Byzantine inheritance and legacy in the centuries following 1453 were the Angelo Flavio Comneno family, which claimed descent from the Angelos dynasty. Their claims to descend from the Angeloi was accepted in Western Europe without much dispute, given that there were already several known descendants of Byzantine nobility across the continent, legitimate or not. Because they had prominent familial connections and through some means managed to convince the popes of the legitimacy of their descent, they reached a position more or less unique among the various Byzantine claimants. Any imperial ancestry can't be proven for these later Angeloi, though it is possible that they descended either directly or collaterally from less well known children or cousins of the Angeloi emperors. Their earliest certain ancestor was the Albanian Andres Engjëlli (hellenized as "Andreas Angelos"), alive in the 1480s, who later generations claimed held the titles "Prince of Macedonia" and "Duke of Drivasto".

In 1545, the brothers Andrea and Paolo of the Angelo Flavio Comneno family were officially acknowledged as descendants of the Angeloi emperors by Pope Paul III. The two brothers were also guaranteed the right to inherit territory in the former Byzantine Empire, should such territory be recovered from the Ottomans. The Angelo Flavio Comneno were the founders and first heads of Imperial Constantinian Order of Saint George, an order they claimed to have been founded by Constantine the Great in the 4th century. The claims that this order represented an ancient imperial institution and something which many emperors had served as Grand Masters for is fantasy; there are no Byzantine accounts of such an institution ever existing. Furthermore, chivalric orders, especially in a western sense, were completely unknown in the Byzantine world. The Angelo Flavio Comneno family is generally regarded to have gone extinct in the male line with the death of Giovanni Andrea II Angeli in 1703, though some people claiming descent are attested thereafter. Gian Antonio Lazier (or "Johannes Antonius Angelus Flavius Comnenus Lascaris Palaeologus"), who died in Vienna in 1738, that claimed descent not only from the Angeloi but also from Theodore II Palaiologos. Lazier referred to himself as "Princeps de genere Imperatorum Orientis" and claimed connection with the Constantinian Order.

Among later "Byzantine pretenders", Lazier was not alone in making claims to the Constantinian order, or other invented chivalric orders. Many later forgers of Byzantine claims purported that they were either part of the Constantinian Order, or its legitimate Grand Master. Claims of male-line descent from the Angelos dynasty continue to this day. The Angelo-Comneno family in Italy, established by the forger Mario Bernardo Pierangeli, claim in their self-published genealogy to descend from John Doukas, a son of Michael II Komnenos Doukas, Despot of Epirus, whose father Michael I was a cousin of emperors Isaac II Angelos and Alexios III Angelos and claim the title "Prince of Thessaly and Epirus".

==== Kantakouzenos dynasty ====
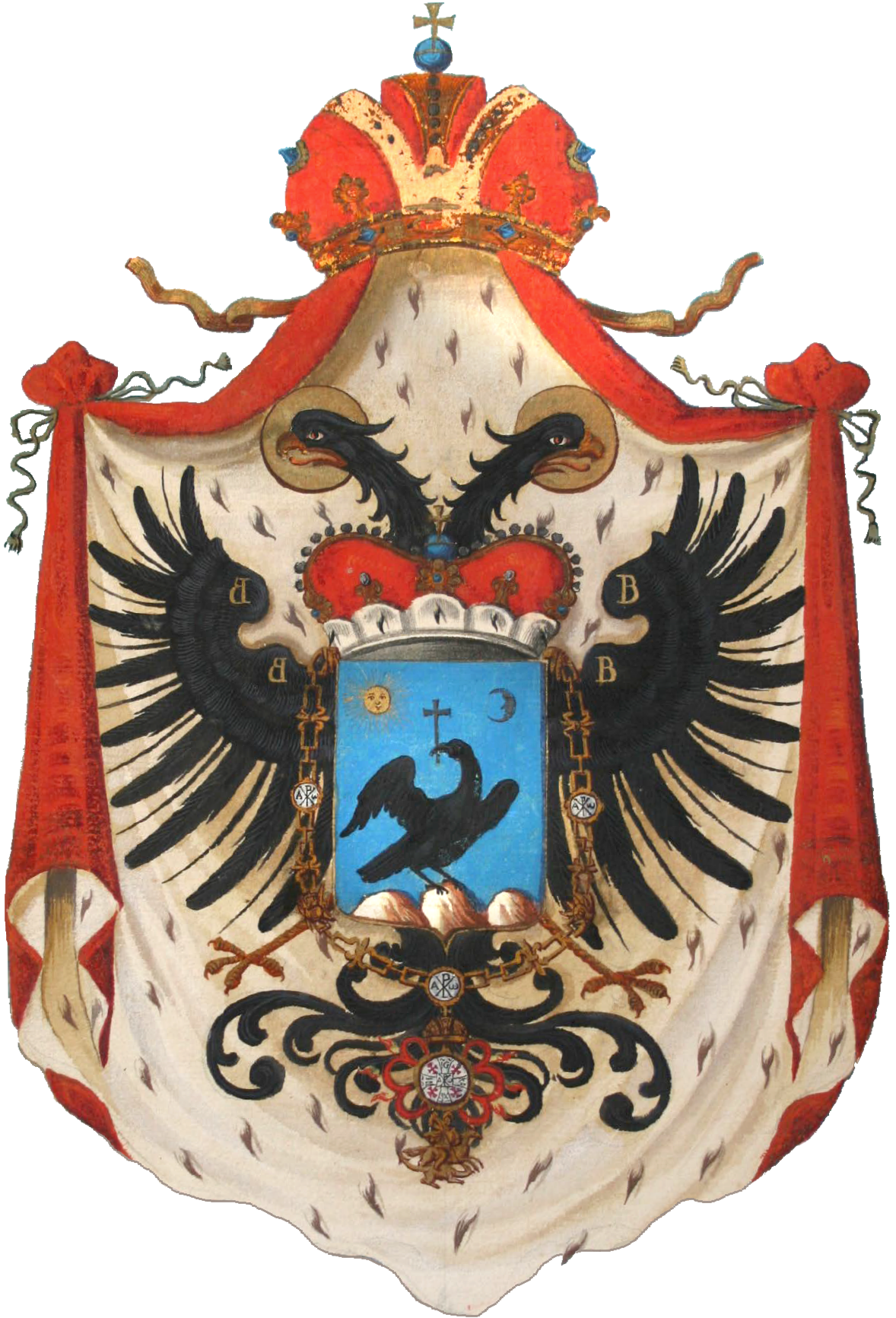
Coat of arms of Șerban Cantacuzino, Prince of Wallachia 1678–1688

The Kantakouzenos dynasty briefly ruled the Byzantine Empire 1347–1357, in opposition to the Palaiologos dynasty, which they nearly succeeded in supplanting. The only two emperors of the family were John VI Kantakouzenos (r. 1347–1354) and his son Matthew Kantakouzenos (r. 1353–1357). The family survived their deposition in favor of the Palaiologoi. Through Matthew's son Demetrios Kantakouzenos (c. 1343–1384), the two Kantakouzenos emperors left numerous descendants. In 1453–1454, one of these descendants, Manuel Kantakouzenos, led a revolt against Demetrios and Thomas Palaiologos, hoping to claim the Despotate of the Morea for himself.

The Paleologu family in Romania is not the only Romanian aristocratic family descending from phanariots who claim to be imperial descendants. Also sent to Romania in the time following the Ottoman conquest of the country were Greek aristocrats with the last name Kantakouzenos, who purported to be descendants of John VI Kantakouzenos. These Kantakounzenoi, who periodically achieved high positions in Romania, survive to this day as the Cantacuzino family. Scholars are divided on the veracity of their descent. Steven Runciman stated in 1985 that they were "perhaps the only family whose claim to be in the direct line from Byzantine Emperors is authentic", but Donald Nicol noted in 1968 that "Patriotic Rumanian historians have indeed labored to show that ... of all the Byzantine imperial families that of the Kantakouzenos is the only one which can truthfully be said to have survived to this day; but the line of succession after the middle of the fifteenth century is, to say the least, uncertain."

==== Komnenos dynasty ====
The Komnenos dynasty ruled the Byzantine Empire 1081–1185. The family survived beyond its deposition in 1185, when Emperor Andronikos I Komnenos was deposed and killed in favor of Isaac II Angelos. The dynasty's turbulent fall from power left only two survivors: Alexios and David, grandsons of Andronikos I. The boys were taken to Georgia for their safety, but returned in the time around the chaos of the Fourth Crusade, when they conquered the eastern Black Sea provinces of the Byzantine Empire and founded the Empire of Trebizond in 1204, one of the Byzantine successor states that claimed to be the rightful government-in-exile during the time of the Latin Empire, which had been founded by the crusaders. The descendants of Alexios, Trebizond's first emperor, would rule the small empire until it was conquered by the Ottomans in 1461, the last Byzantine territory to fall. They often used the last name 'Megas Komnenos' ("Grand Komnenos"). The last emperor of Trebizond, David Megas Komnenos, was captured in 1461 and executed alongside most of his family at Constantinople by Mehmed II on 1 November 1463.

The last member of the Komnenos dynasty is typically considered to have been John Komnenos Molyvdos (1657–1719), a distinguished Greek scholar and physician in the Ottoman Empire, who later in life became a monk and Eastern Orthodox metropolitan bishop of Side and Dristra. Per a 1695 document, John was the great-great-great-great-great-grandson of Emperor Basil Megas Komnenos of Trebizond (r. 1332–1340).

Several princesses of Trebizond married into the ruling family of the Aq Qoyunlu and other Turkoman tribes, but the inadequate sources makes tracing most of their lines of descent impossible. Some lineages are documented; for instance, Theodora Megale Komnene, a daughter of Emperor John IV Megas Komnenos (r. 1429–1459), was an ancestor of the Safavid Shahs of Iran, through her marriage to Uzun Hasan of the Aq Qoyunlu. The only probable link between the emperors of Trebizond and nobility of Europe, given the extinction of several lines of Georgian royals with Komnenoi ancestry, is the possible marriage of the Georgian noble Mamia Gurieli to a daughter of Emperor Alexios IV Megas Komnenos (r. 1417–1429). This marriage is uncertain, but if the interpretation of the sources is correct, the numerous families of the Russian and Georgian aristocracy who can trace descent from Mamia's son Kakhaber II Gurieli are also descendants of the Komnenoi of Trebizond.

Demetrio Stefanopoli (1749–1821), a French military officer of Greek descent from Corsica, claimed to be a descendant of the Megas Komnenos emperors of the Empire of Trebizond (who in turn were descendants of the Komnenos dynasty of Byzantium). He claimed to be a thirteenth-generation descendant of David Megas Komnenos through an otherwise unattested son called Nikephoros Komnenos. Even if Nikephoros had been a real son of David, David's sons are recorded as having been executed alongside him in 1463. Demetrio's claim to descend from the Komnenoi was officially recognized by King Louis XVI of France in 1782, whereafter Demetrio assumed the full name Démètre Stephanopoli de Comnène and a coat of arms containing the double-headed eagle of Byzantium. Though their claim of descent cannot be confidently verified, Demetrio does not appear to have made it up out of thin air himself. According to later writers, that the Stefanopoli family descended from the Komnenoi was a well-established local tradition within the Greek community of Corsica. Demetrio's sister, Panoria Stefanopoli, aka Panoria Comnène (mother of Laure Junot, Duchess of Abrantès, wife of French Napoleonic General Jean-Andoche Junot), was also convinced of their Komnenoi descent and would later, after Napoleon's rise to power as Emperor of the French, attempt to fabricate a link between the Bonaparte family and the Byzantine Empire.

==== Laskaris dynasty ====
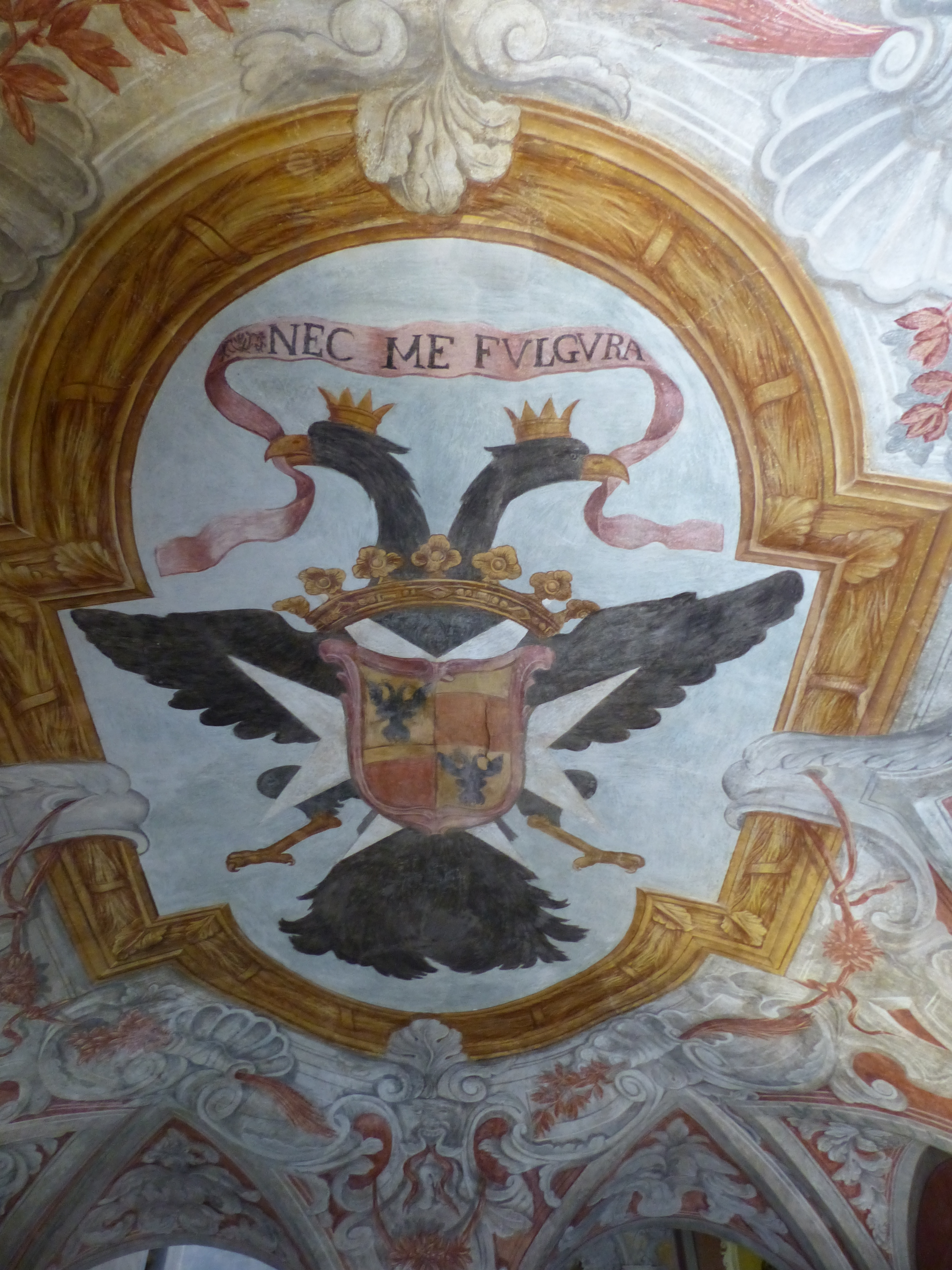
Coat of arms of the Italian Ventimiglia-Lascaris family, matrilineal descendants of the Laskaris dynasty

The Laskaris dynasty ruled the Empire of Nicaea 1204–1261, the Byzantine government-in-exile during the time Constantinople was ruled by the Latin Empire. Although the imperial branch of the Laskaris family was gruesomely deposed by Michael VIII Palaiologos, founder of the Palaiologos dynasty, with the blinding and imprisonment of the last Laskaris emperor, John IV Laskaris, members of the extended Laskaris family not part of the immediate former imperial family continued to be prominent in the imperial court during the Palaiologos dynasty and many emigrated to the west after the Fall of Constantinople, such as the famous scholar and grammarian Constantine Lascaris (1434–1501) who worked for Francesco Sforza, Duke of Milan.

Descendants of the Laskaris emperors survived in the female line. Upon usurping the throne, Michael VIII Palaiologos married off John IV's sisters, daughters of Theodore II Laskaris, to foreigners to ensure that their descendants would not be able to claim the Byzantine throne. The most prominent western branch of the Laskaris descendants were the house of Ventimiglia-Lascaris, extinct in 1838, founded through the marriage of Eudoxia Laskarina, one of Theodore II's daughters, and Count Guglielmo Pietro I of Ventimiglia and Tenda. Eudoxia and Pietro had five children, but she was eventually refused by him and travelled to the court of James I of Aragon and later a Dominican convent in Zaragoza, where she lived for the rest of her life. One of her most prominent descendants was Giovanni Paolo Lascaris, Grand Master of the Knights of Malta 1636–1657.

As the Laskaris dynasty was the penultimate dynasty of the Byzantine Empire, some later forgers fabricated links to that family, rather than to the Palaiologoi. Among the most prominent "Laskaris" forgers were the Spanish lawyer Eugenio Lascorz y Labastida (1886–1962) and the Italian eccentric Marziano Lavarello (1921–1992). Lascorz was a lawyer who claimed his surname to be a corruption of "Laskaris" and claimed to be the rightful Emperor of Constantinople as Eugene II Lascaris Comnenus. To support his claims, he produced a detailed fabricated genealogy, (Note: There is no evidence for most of the genealogy Lascorz created. In the early sections, where the genealogy overlaps with real Byzantine history and families, many portions are demonstrably false. The genealogy names the father of Emperor Theodore I Laskaris as Manuel (or Emmanouil), but the name of their father is not known from historical sources and was probably Nicholas, since Theodore gave that name to his firstborn son (per Byzantine naming customs the firstborn son was commonly named after one's father). According to the genealogy, the family descends from one of Theodore's brothers, Manuel, who was a real historical figure, but the genealogy designates him as sharing a mother with Theodore and Constantine. The real Manuel was likely only their half-brother, just having the same father. The genealogy gives Manuel a son, Constantine, who is called "Prince of Epirus", and a grandson, "Manuel II" (supposedly the rightful heir to the empire after the death of John IV Laskaris), who is titled as "Count of Cefalonia". At this time, Epirus was under the rule of the Komnenos Doukas family, a branch of the Angelos dynasty, not the Laskaris dynasty. Manuel II's son, "Thomas I", is stated to have married "Anna Palaeologa, sister of Emperor Andronikos". Emperor Andronikos II Palaiologos did have a sister of that name, who did marry an Epirote noble, but that noble was not a "Thomas Laskaris", but Demetrios Doukas Komnenos Koutroules, son of the despot Michael II Komnenos Doukas.) which altered his own familial history, changing the names and life stories of even his immediate relatives. He also claimed to be the head of the Constantinian Order, as well as some invented chivalric orders of his own. Lascorz's descendants maintain his claims to this day. Lavarello claimed to be the rightful emperor of both Constantinople and Trebizond, as well as the rightful king of Serbia, among other titles and honors. Lavarello worked on his genealogy throughout his life, and eventually even began to claim descent from the Greek god Zeus. Both Lascorz and Lavarello, as well as other pretenders, obtained legal recognition of their claims in Italian courts, which typically did not investigate their claims and lacked the competence and authority to proclaim someone as a Byzantine descendant. Lavarello famously feuded with the comedian and actor Totò, who also claimed Byzantine descent, mostly to mock the meaninglessness of doing so.

== See also ==
- Succession of the Roman Empire
- Ottoman claim to Roman succession
- Moscow, third Rome
- Legacy of the Roman Empire
- Problem of two emperors
- Byzantine commonwealth
