= Pietro Paleologo Mastrogiovanni =

- Born: 5 March 1931
- Died: 2017 (aged 85–86)
- Occupations: Psychiatrist, pretender

Pietro Donato Paleologo Mastrogiovanni (5 March 1931 – 2017), self-styled as Pietro III Paleologo or Pietro III Paleologo Mastrogiovanni, was an Italian psychiatrist and pretender. Claiming descent from Thomas Palaiologos, a brother of the last Byzantine emperor, though a son called "Rogerio", whose existence is overwhelmingly dismissed as fantasy in scholarship, Mastrogiovanni claimed to be the sole legitimate pretender to the throne of the Byzantine Empire. None of the sparse documents supposedly confirming Mastrogiovanni's descent have been authenticated.

== Biography ==
Pietro Donato Paleologo Mastrogiovanni was born on 5 March 1931. In addition to maintaining his pretensions, he worked as a psychiatrist at the Salerno Health Department and also ran his own private practice. His immediate ancestors also worked in the medical industry; his father was a doctor in Italy's African colonies and his grandfather was a pharmacist.

Through his own self-published genealogy, Mastrogiovanni claimed himself to be the current pretender to the throne of the Byzantine Empire. In full, he claimed the titles "Titular Emperor of Constantinople and the Greek East, King of the Hellenes, of Morea and of Epirus, Lord of the Aegean and of Cappadocia", and he points to a 1966 ruling by a court in the Salerno as proof of the authenticity of his genealogy. In 1981, another court in Salerno ruled in favor of Mastrogiovanni in a dispute with another forger, Enrico de Vigo Paleologo (or "Enrico III"). Enrico was dismissed as a forger and con artist, whereas Mastrogiovanni was recognized as legitimate. In a 1981 interview with the German newspaper Der Spiegel, after the results of the ruling, Mastrogiovanni maintained that he, like Enrico, could easily bestow titles given that a sovereign, even when they no longer have an empire, still maintains fons honorum ("fount of honor"). Mastrogiovanni further claimed in 1981 that he maintained diplomatic relations with several states and that "the recognition of my diplomatic representatives is currently being negotiated with the UN".

Mastrogiovanni claimed descent from Thomas Palaiologos, the younger brother of Constantine XI Palaiologos, the last Byzantine emperor, alleging in the 1981 interview that from Thomas "the line of ancestors leads from father to firstborn son directly to me, over 16 generations". Mastrogiovanni's supposed branch of the Palaiologos dynasty, the "Mastrogiovanni", claims descent from a supposed son of Thomas called Rogerio or Ruggerio, supposedly born around 1430 and sent as a hostage to Alfonso the Magnanimous of Aragon and Naples. Supposedly, Rogerio was responsible for erecting the Spirito Santo church, which still stands, in Casalsottano, a hamlet of the Italian comune San Mauro Cilento. Rogerio was supposedly survived by his two children John (Giovanni) and Angela, with John allegedly being granted the feudal holdings of Perito and Ostigliano in Salerno. The name "Mastrogiovanni" was said to have originated from John's descendants adopting it in his honor. This supposed family history mainly derives from oral tradition, with few documents supporting it. None of the documents have been authenticated and there are several issues with the overall reconstruction of events and descent. Modern researchers overwhelmingly dismiss the existence of Rogerio as fantasy. Among the most damning evidence is Rogerio's clearly Italian (rather than Greek) first name, the unlikelihood of a potential imperial heir being kept as hostage in Italy and that there are no mentions of him in Byzantine records. The contemporary Byzantine historian George Sphrantzes, who described the life of Thomas Palaiologos in detail, wrote on the birth of Thomas' son Andreas Palaiologos on 17 January 1453 that the boy was "a continuator and heir" of the Palaiologan lineage, a phrase which makes little sense if Andreas was not Thomas' first-born son.

From 2017 onwards, Mastrogiovanni's claims as titular emperor and Grand Master of the Constantinian Order of Saint George have been maintained by his son, Giovanni Angelo, self-styled as "Giovanni XIII Paleologo" or "Giovanni Angelo XIII Paleologo Mastrogiovanni". Giovanni Angelo heads the "Union of Byzantine Aristocracy", a group which also includes other Byzantine princes, such as Maria Eugenia Láscaris, a granddaughter of the Spanish Byzantine forger-pretender Eugenio Lascorz.
