= Theodore Palaeologo =

Maltese pretender to the throne of Greece

Theodore Palaeologo or Theodore Attardo di Cristoforo de Bouillion (c. 1823–1912), self-styled as Theodore Attardo di Cristoforo de Bouillion, Prince Nicephorus Comnenus Palaeologus, was a Maltese pretender to the throne of Greece, active in the late 19th century.

== Biography ==
Theodore Palaeologo was born c. 1823 (being 89 years old at the time of his death in 1912), probably in Malta. Palaeologo is first attested in 1862, then living in England, when he upon the deposition of King Otto of Greece put forward his own claim to the throne of Greece. Palaeologo claimed descent from the Palaiologos dynasty, the last ruling dynasty of the Byzantine Empire, of which the last confidently historically verified members died out in the 16th century. According to his tombstone, the claim to the Greek throne was made in 1863 (rather than 1862). Nothing ultimately came of Palaeologo's attempt to become the king of Greece; ultimately, the Danish prince William was elected to succeed Otto as King George I of Greece.

Palaeologo married Laura, daughter of the Maltese noble Nicholas Testaferrata Marchese di Noto. Both Palaeologo and his wife died in 1912. They are both buried at West Norwood Cemetery in London. Paleologo and Laura were the parents of Eugenie Paleologue (1849–1934). Eugenie also claimed to be the heir to the Palaiologoi emperors and at times also put forth her supposed claim to the Greek throne.
