= Battle of Verbia =

- Part of the Moldavian Magnate Wars
- Approximate route of the 1561 invasion
| Date | November 18, 1561 |
| Location | Verbia, Dorohoi County, Moldavia (now in Botoșani County, Romania) |
| Result | Rebel victory |
| Territorial changes | Rebels gain control over most of Moldavia |

Belligerents
| Rebel forces: Military support: Kingdom of Poland; Holy Roman Empire; (Sovereign Military Order of Malta) Knights Hospitaller (putative); Zaporizhian Sich | Moldavia: Military support: Ottoman Empire; Wallachia |

Commanders and leaders
| Iacob Heraclid; Olbracht Łaski; Ion Moțoc; Pierre Roussel; Peter Soldicki; Anton Székely; Captain Vilelle | (Moldavia) Alexandru Lăpușneanu |

Strength
| ≈2,000 total 100 Silesians | ≈25,000 total ≈300–700 Janissaries; 800 Turkish–Tatar cavalry |

The Battle of Verbia was the decisive episode in Iacob Heraclid (Despot)'s invasion of Moldavia, taking place on November 18 (Old Style: November 8), 1561. Heraclid and Olbracht Łaski's army was backed by the Holy Roman Empire and possibly also by the Knights Hospitaller; it comprised foreign mercenaries, including Spaniards armed with arquebuses, making this the first battle in Moldavian history to be won by superior firepower. The Moldavian military forces under Prince Alexandru Lăpușneanu were backed by Janissaries, but lost crucial support from the cavalry when commander Ion Moțoc defected to the enemy. From the village of Verbia, located outside Dimăcheni, Heraclid's Hungarian troops stormed into Botoșani, slaughtering the surviving Janissaries.

The battle was preceded by some two years of attempts by Heraclid and his associates to murder or chase out Lăpușneanu. Increasingly unpopular among his subjects, the latter had ultimately lost the confidence of his backers. Verbia finally allowed Heraclid to inaugurate his program as a Protestant ruler in an Orthodox country, cemented by his edict of toleration on December 2, 1561. His own popularity with both regular subjects and boyar elites declined rapidly, in particular when it became apparent that he was actively pursuing a religious transformation of the country. He also focused on plans to create a "Dacian" realm, bringing him into conflict with the Eastern Hungarian Kingdom, and losing him military support.

By 1563, both Łaski and Moțoc had turned against Heraclid, leaving the path open for usurpation by Ștefan Tomșa. Besieged in Suceava, where he alienated many of his remaining supporters, Heraclid was finally killed by Tomșa's own hand. A mural of his 1561 victory existed on the walls of his palace, but was eventually destroyed. The village witnessed a second battle in 1600, when Michael the Brave managed to oust Prince Ieremia Movilă.

== Background ==
Heraclid (or Heraclid Despot), an adventurer and forger of Greek Maltese origin, depicted himself as, among other things, a nephew of Stephen the Great. His various links with Moldavia included accounts about his father, John Heraclides. According to Iacob's own account, John had been killed on Moldavian territory, possibly at Hârlău. He blamed this execution on either the Ottomans or on Prince Ștefăniță (reigned 1517–1527). The pretender built up his career as a mercenary from 1553, when he became a military expert for the Reichsarmatur, seeing action during the war in Flanders. In late 1555, he became an Imperial Count Palatine. Heraclid's parallel career was as a religious polemicist and preacher. His involvement with the Reformation began ca. 1554, when he met Philip Melanchthon; he was prompted to consider designs for a unification between the Protestant and Orthodox faiths, and came to view Moldavia as a stepping-stone toward that ultimate goal. While spreading the faith in Poland, he moved away from mainline Lutheranism, embracing Calvinism and finally Nontrinitarianism, though he remained discreet about his personal religion.

Heraclid first saw an opportunity for usurping power in Moldavia at some point before 1558, when he met with boyars who were fleeing persecutions ordered by Prince Alexandru Lăpușneanu. Depicting himself as related to Lăpușneanu's wife Ruxandra Rareș, he was probably supported by the Polish Calvinists and by Archduke Maximilian, who were at the time forging an alliance with each other. After spending time at Lăpușneanu's court in Suceava, he co-opted other conspirators, including physician Giorgio Biandrata and the Orthodox Patriarch, Joasaph II. Their attempt at poisoning the Prince failed, forcing Heraclid to flee from the country.

While visiting the Eastern Hungarian Kingdom and meeting Dowager Queen Isabella Jagiellon, Heraclid forged an alliance with Olbracht Łaski. In Kesmark, they received a delegation of Moldavian boyars, which included representatives of the Orthodox Metropolis. These figures asked for the Holy Roman Empire, and Maximilian specifically, to depose Lăpușneanu, declaring their support for Heraclid's crowning as Prince. In late 1560, having received Maximilian's tacit backing, Despot and Łaski began planning an invasion of Moldavia. Their troops were commanded by Anton Székely, and numbered as many as 2,000 people; they included some 500 Polish Protestants, as well as a garrison of arquebusiers from Habsburg Spain, under Captain Pierre Roussel (or Rossillio), himself hailing from the Habsburg Netherlands.

While popular with the Polish religious dissenters, the expedition was viewed with skepticism by Western Protestants: Hubert Languet wrote that Heraclid and Łaski were "brothers in foolishness". It was also viewed with apprehension by regular Moldavians: the Chronicle of Azarie describes these "men of all tongues" as having the "cruelty of lions", while their leader was a "snake". Heraclid's force prepared an invasion through Ruthenia, but Łaski failed to seek approval from Polish King Sigismund II Augustus. Preferring to keep Lăpușneanu as his vassal, Sigismund ordered Mikołaj Sieniawski to arrest Łaski and Heraclid; the latter escaped arrest by staging his own death.

== Battle ==
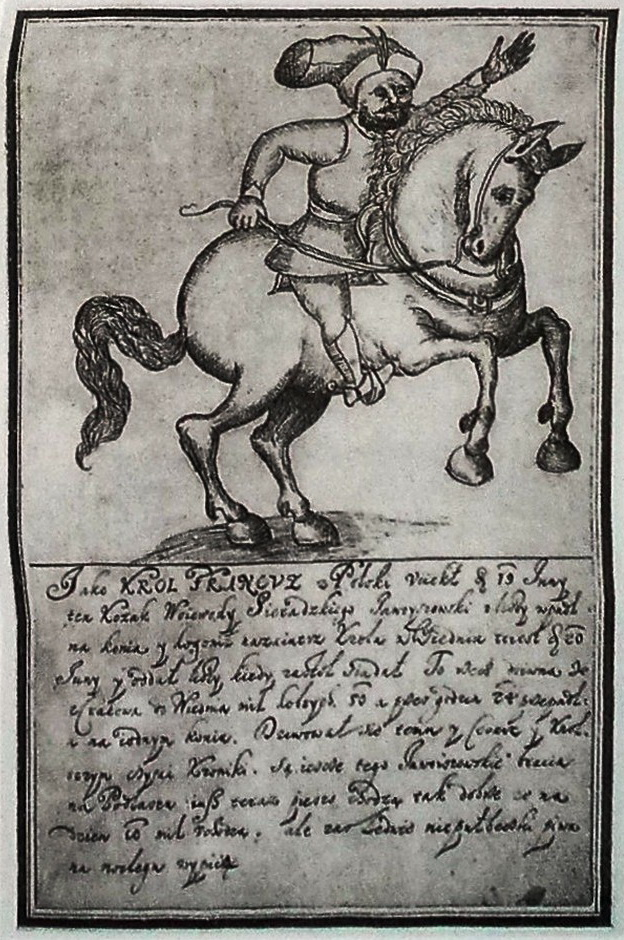
One of Łaski's Cossack cavalrymen. Drawing from a 1587 manuscript

In 1561, Heraclid adapted his strategy, seeking support from the Sublime Porte. Since Sultan Suleiman the Magnificent did not explicitly reject the possibility of recognizing Heraclid as Prince, the Polish King no longer had a strategic reason to oppose Łaski's conspiracy. Moreover, Heraclid obtained crucial backing from Joseph Nasi, the Ottoman court Jew, who was then emerging "one of the most influential figures at the Porte". It is possible, but not definitively proven, that he also took directives from the Knights Hospitaller, and specifically from Grand Master Jean Parisot de Valette. With new sponsorships, he was able to hire many Zaporozhian Cossacks, who were making one of their first-ever appearances in Moldavian history. In addition to Székely and Roussel, the rebel army now included a Frenchman, Captain Vilelle, and 100 Silesians, under Peter Soldicki.

A letter by the Florentine merchant Antonio Pandolfi purports that Lăpușneanu asked his boyars to set a trap for Heraclid. They renewed their calls for Heraclid to invade Moldavia, knowing that Lăpușneanu's troops were vastly superior in numbers. Pandolfi suggests that the invading force had "1,200 riders and 600 footmen", including 860 "mostly Hungarian" mercenaries spread between the two categories; the Moldavians, meanwhile had 19,000 horsemen (5,000 of them boyars and their retinues) and 700 arquebusiers, though the vast majority of the army comprised peasants. The arquebusiers were possibly all Ottoman in origin: although Despot had obtained Ottoman approval, sources suggest that Lăpușneanu still maintained a battalion of Janissaries, armed with "Persian weapons". Pandolfi notes that there were other mercenaries on the Moldavian side, including 800 riders of Turkish or Tatar origin. The total is estimated by military historian Nicolae Bălcescu as "25,000 troops".

The new expedition was justified by Łaski with a speech that he held (or claimed to have held) in front of his troops; in it, he equated Heraclid with Heracles and Lăpușneanu with Diomedes of Thrace. According to a romanticized account by Horea Teculescu, surprise was still ensured when Lăpușneanu refused to believe that his rival was still alive, going so far as to behead the messenger who brought him news he found incredible, "blaming him for creating false panic in the land." This narrative is contradicted by documents showing that Lăpușneanu was complaining to Suleiman, his overlord, that the Holy Roman Empire was maneuvering against Ottoman influence through Heraclid's scheming. His attempt to resist was coherent, but severely weakened by the failures of his levy system, as many militias refused to rally with the Moldavian military forces; Lăpușneanu hoped to compensate by obtaining support from Wallachia, which was then under a friendly Prince, Peter the Younger. Pandolfi reports that the peasant troops in general gave up on their Prince, and claims to render their protest: combatta il Re con li suoi Baroni, che hanno fatto tante ingiustizi ("let the King and his Barons fight this one, with all the injustices they have committed").

Łaski and Székely led the charge into Moldavia: they routed Lăpușneanu's cavalry units, led by Moțoc, but could not hope to cross the Siret. Lăpușneanu loyalists were dug in on the river's western bank, waiting for Wallachian reinforcements. Székely reportedly neutralized this threat by corrupting Moțoc, who agreed to betray his liege. The decisive battle was fought at Verbia in Dorohoi. This was a strategic location on the road between the fortress of Hotin and Suceava, located on the left side of Jijia River. Lăpușneanu's army was left exposed by Moțoc and his cavalry, who went over to Heraclid's side during the actual fighting. A contemporary biographer, Johann Sommer, proposed that arquebus firepower had a decisive contribution in the battle, as "most of [the Moldavians] had never before even seen those handheld bombards, and so they and their horses could catch sound of them without the greatest distress." While the loyalists had canons of their own, these were very short-range and all of them were aimed toward stopping infantry from crossing the bridge on the Jijia.

== Consequences ==
Bălcescu analyses Verbia as evidence that the Moldavian people had ceased fighting "for its nationhood and its liberty", meaning that their "progress in the military art" had entered standstill. As he notes, Lăpușneanu, "for all the numerical superiority of his army, for all the personal courage he showed, lost [at Verbia], being uneducated on how to make proper use of his artillery, unwilling to go on the offensive at the right time, and providing a limp defense once he was under attack." Victory at Verbia gave Despot control over most of Moldavia, though there were still other noted clashes. Ten days after the battle, 260 Janissaries had barricaded themselves in the inner courtyards of Botoșani. They prepared for a standoff with Heraclid's Hungarian mercenaries, who stormed into that city; Hungarians won the day, jumping over the fences and killing the Janissaries "down to the last one." A final battle against Lăpușneanu's loyalists was waged in the Lower Country, at Huși. Chased out and having to seek the protection of Ottoman Muslims, Lăpușneanu reportedly lamented his fate, noting that he would have rather "lived among the wild beasts".

Taking Vaslui on December 2, Heraclid issued his edict of toleration toward all branches of Christianity, ordering an end to his predecessor's attacks on non-Orthodox faiths. The writ was also an invitation to Protestants facing persecution elsewhere in Europe to colonize Moldavia. Over the following months, he was able to prevent Suleiman from organizing a punitive raid on Moldavia by assuring him that he did not intend to shake off Moldavia's submission to the Ottomans. However, he began publicizing his plan to restore ancient virtues in the Danubian Principalities and Transylvania, hinting at the liberation of "Dacia" from this vassalage. He also sent Roussel on a mission to Europe with proposals for an anti-Ottoman crusade. This involved making territorial claims on the Eastern Hungarians, from whom he demanded Ciceu and Cetatea de Baltă; he reportedly groomed a favorite of his to take over as his representative in Transylvania.

Heraclid ruled from Suceava, where he had the Verbia battle depicted on the walls of princely palace; the work did not survive into modern times. His eccentric religious policies, beginning with a ban on divorces, drew immediate suspicion from many of his Orthodox subjects. Tensions flared as he ordered reliquaries and other religious objects to be melted for bullion—though it remains unclear whether this was a display of Protestant iconoclasm or just utilitarian in nature. Moldavians were also angered when the Prince ordered them to pay a ducat for every household. They were driven into open rebellion by signs that he was intending to establish a Protestant dynasty by marrying one of Marcin Zborowski's daughters.

Increasingly isolated after his failed matrimonial alliance with Zborowski, Heraclid called on Łaski and appointed him as his heir. Within weeks, relations between the two men soured dramatically over financial matters, and the deal was cancelled. During Eucharist, Moldavia's high-ranking clergy staged an attempt on Despot's life, but failed, and were decimated. The plot was resumed and enhanced once boyars Moțoc and Iosif Veveriță renounced their support for Heraclid and pledged it to the rebellious Hatman, Ștefan Tomșa. This spiraled into a civil war, with Łaski as the arbiter, and with the involvement of Eastern Hungarians on Tomșa's side. In summer 1563, Dmytro Vyshnevetsky, Hetman of the Zaporizhian Sich, stormed into Moldavia with the probable intention of seizing Despot's throne—and, initially, with Łaski's endorsement. During these events, Vyshnevetsky and Łaski allegedly quarreled, allowing Tomșa to capture the Hetman. Vyshnevetsky was later delivered to the Ottomans, who had him impaled on hooks.

Most of the mercenary troops deserted Heraclid by late 1562, leaving him with mostly Hungarian troops. Many of them were murdered at Sipoteni, after being promised a celebratory meal by Tomșa. Still controlling Suceava, Heraclid only commanded the loyalties of 656 men. During the siege, he began suspecting his own garrison commander, Captain Devay (also Devan or Dervici), of preparing a treasonous surrender. By ordering Devay executed, he probably pushed his soldiers into contemplating desertion. Heraclid is presumed to have been murdered by Tomșa himself upon surrendering in November 1563. Of the Verbia and Sipoteni survivors, Roussel's Spaniards remained loyal to the Prince to this last day of his reign. A xenophobic massacre was reported by Pandolfi, who notes that Hungarians and Italians were lynched all over Moldavia, once Despot had surrendered; he was probably one of the survivors.

Tomșa and Moțoc failed to gain recognition for their regime, and were finally killed with Ottoman acquiescence. Lăpușneanu, who may have spent time as a galley slave, returned to inaugurate a rule of terror, punishing the boyars for their insubordination. According to a revisionist assessment by historian Virgil Cândea, he "apparently only killed 12 boyars, namely those who had betrayed him at Verbia in 1561". During that interval, Roussel reappeared as the backer of another rival pretender, Ștefan Mâzgă. Verbia was again the site of a major battle in early 1600, at the height of the Moldavian Magnate Wars. A Wallachian force under Michael the Brave defeated here the Moldavian Prince Ieremia Movilă, effecting a short-lived political union between Wallachia, Transylvania and Moldavia.
