= Dimăcheni =

- Commune
- Location in Botoșani County

- Location in Romania
- Coordinates: 47°54′N 26°33′E
- Country: Romania
- County: Botoșani
- Subdivisions: Dimăcheni, Mateieni, Recia-Verbia

Government
  - Mayor (2024–2028): Marinel Moruz (PSD)
- Area: 37.78 km^{2} (14.59 sq mi)
- Population (2021-12-01): 1,338
  - Density: 35.42/km^{2} (91.73/sq mi)
- Time zone: UTC+02:00 (EET)
  - Summer (DST): UTC+03:00 (EEST)
- Postal code: 717077
- Area code: +40 x31
- Vehicle reg.: BT
- Website: primaria-dimacheni.ro

Dimăcheni is a commune in Botoșani County, Western Moldavia, Romania. It is composed of three villages: Dimăcheni, Mateieni and Recia-Verbia. Located on the once-strategic road between fortress of Hotin and Suceava, Verbia was the site of two decisive battles in the history of Moldavia: the November 1561 clash between Iacob Heraclid and Alexandru Lăpușneanu; and Michael the Brave's defeat of Ieremia Movilă in May 1600.
