= John George Heracleus Basilicos =

16th century mercenary and pretender

John George Heracleus Basilicos (fl. 1566–1606) was a mercenary and pretender, mainly active in Italy in the late 16th century and early 17th century. Heracleus claimed to be a descendant of the Roman emperor Heraclius (r. 610–641) and through a varying assortment of titles claimed to be the legitimate ruler of the Peloponnese, Macedonia, Moldavia, Wallachia and Albania. Until 1593, he also claimed to be the Grand Master of the Constantinian Order of Saint George, in opposition to the legitimate grand masters Andrea, Pietro and Giovanni Andrea I Angeli.

Heracleus' origins are not clear, given that no surviving documents specify his native land. His name evoked intentional similarities to the Moldavian prince Iacob Heraclid, who was born under the name Basilicò, originally a Greek adventurer. Depending on the document, Heracleus claimed that Heraclid was either his uncle or his brother. Heracleus may have had some connections to the Peloponnese in Greece, since this region was consistently brought up in his claimed titles.

== Origins and name ==
It is impossible to verify the origins and place of birth of John George Heracleus Basilicos; in his surviving documents there are no mentions of his native land. Although he did provide detailed genealogies tracing his descent from earlier Balkan royals, these are considered improbable and are not considered reliable sources of information. Perhaps he had some obscure links to the Peloponnese in Greece, given that he brought up the region relatively consistently in his claimed titles. It is probable that Heracleus' first name, John, was not his genuine name and that he had instead assumed it according to the usual practice of the rulers of the Romanian principalities (Wallachia and Moldavia). The supposed surname "Basilicos" (or Basilicus) is also of unclear authenticity given that it may actually be an adjective and not a name (given that the related substantive, Basileus, was used as a title). However, Basilicos was also by no means an uncommon Greek surname at this time. In documents from 1573 onwards, Heracleus is consistently called just "John George Heracleo" or variations thereof, such as the Italian "Joan Georgio Heraclio". Sometimes, "John" was omitted as well.

His name evoked clear and intentional similarities to the Moldavian prince Iacob Heraclid, born Basilicò. Iacob Heraclid was originally a Greek adventurer, scholar, and soldier and his career, in particular his spectacular rise to the Moldavian throne as "despot" in 1561 and the ease in which garnered the support of both Poland and the Holy Roman Empire to force his predecessor as ruler in Moldavia, the legitimate prince Alexandru Lăpușneanu, off the throne. In the immediate aftermath of Heraclid's death in 1563, many pretenders across Europe, impressed by his rise to power, began to falsify connections to him. Generally, such pretenders were in the same line of business as Heraclid had originally been, being mercenaries or adventurers. The contemporary political situation in the Balkans, and Moldavia specifically, with confusion in regards to lines of successions and frequent interference by external powers, such as the Ottoman Empire, the Habsburg Monarchy, Poland or Russia, encouraged the hopes of ambitious adventurers with only questionable connections to actual ruling families. It is unlikely that Heracleus was related to Iacob Heraclid. His self-published genealogies omitted Heraclid, though Heracleus sometimes in private expressed claims of kinships, inconsistently referring to Heraclid as his uncle or brother.

== Biography ==
Heracleus first emerged on the historical scene in 1566 as a mercenary in Italy. On 16 December that year, Heracleus went public with his pretensions. On that day, he managed to recruit four Greek witnesses (including an Orthodox priest) to declare before the apostolic notary Reynero Borman that Heracleus had once been Prince of Wallachia and that he was the nephew of Iacob Heraclid. Shortly thereafter, he took up residence in Naples, where he would live for most of the rest of his life. In Latin, Heracleus employed the titles Ioannes Georgius Heracleus Basilicus, Despotis Peloponnensi, Moldaviæ Rex et Vallachiæ Princeps. Heracleus was also a pretender to the position of Grand Master of the Constantinian Order of Saint George. In 1567 he wrote a letter to Maximilian II, Holy Roman Emperor, (r. 1564–1576) where he claimed that the Constantinian Order had been founded by Emperor Heraclius (r. 610–641), from whom Heracleus claimed descent.

Heracleus was an acquaintance of the Constantinian Order's actual grand master and founder, Andrea Angeli. Heracleus' story concerning the order, that it had been founded by Heraclius, conflicted with Angeli's version, which claimed the order was founded by Constantine the Great (r. 306–337). In February 1568, Heracleus requested Angeli's assistance in proving that Heracleus was the legitimate son of "John Heracleus Basileus" (or Juan Heracleo Basileo in the original Spanish language of the letter), styled "Despot and Prince of the Peloponnese" and "Despina Trajana", daughter of "Balsamonte", Duke of Cephalonia and descendant of the emperors of Constantinople. Angeli aided Heracleus through claiming that Angeli's mother was related to Heracleus' maternal grandfather. This claimed relation was not real, but it served the interest of both men since it increased the believability of both of their claimed lines of descent.

In a July 1570 letter, Heracleus instead referred to his father simply as "Jovanni" and titled him "King of Serbia and Prince of the Peloponnese". In 1574, a letter from Heracleus to the Spanish diplomat Diego Guzmán de Silva referred to Heracleus' father as "Giovanni Vincenzo, Despot of Serbia". On 28 September 1570, Heracleus, in Genoa at the time, wrote a letter to Alvise I Mocenigo, Doge of Venice, offering assistance in defending Cyprus from the Ottoman Empire as part of the ongoing Fourth Ottoman–Venetian War. His offer of help does not appear to have garnered much attention. In this letter, he styled himself as ex genere imperatorum Flaviorum Augustorum Romanorum moxque Constantinopolitanorum, Dei gratia restaurator ac magnus Magister equitum Sancti Georgii, totius Græciæ succesor, rex Peloponensis, Moldaviæ, Vallachiæ, etc.. On 30 November 1573, Heracleus succeeded in garnering a sparse monthly pension from Philip II of Spain.

Heracleus' claims were soon discredited. On 21 January 1583, Pope Gregory XIII dismissed him as a false pretender, acknowledging Pietro Angeli, Andrea's heir, as the legitimate Byzantine heir in his place. In his 1583 legal process, Heracleus used the style "Prince of the Morea, Despot of Moldavia, King of Macedonia and Albania" as well as "Grand Master of the Order of Saint George". Despite this, Heracleus continued his pretensions until a further complaint was issued in 1593 by Giovanni Andrea I Angeli, Pietro Angeli's son and heir. The Roman Curia again decided in the Angeli family's favor and Heracleus was imprisoned. After being released from prison, Heracleus lived more discreetly. He retained the monthly pensions sent by the Spanish government as the basis of his income. Heracleus is only attested again in 1599, when he was among the prominent members of the Greek community in Naples, involved in working to safe-guard the community's Eastern Orthodox element from integration with the Italian environment around them. Though he dropped the title of grand master of the Constantinian Order, Heracleus never stopped using his other claimed titles, given that they are attested in documents sent to the Spanish government between 1603 and 1606. In these documents, the now quite aged Heracleus petitioned for increasing his pension since the current amount, 25 gold escudos, was not enough to support his poor family in Naples. The Spanish government approved a small increase, to 30 gold escudos, far below Heracleus' requested 50 gold escudos. In their replies to Heracleus, the Spaniards at no point used his claimed titles, indicating that they might no longer have recognized his claims.

== See also ==
- Succession to the Byzantine Empire
