= Motoc =

Motoc may refer to:

== People ==
- Mihnea Motoc, Romanian diplomat
- Iulia Motoc, Romanian lawyer

== Places ==
- Motoc, Bacău, village in Pâncești, Bacău, Romania

== See also ==
- Moțoc
