= Iacob Heraclid =

Ruler of Moldavia (1511–1563)

Iacob Heraclid Despot Vodă
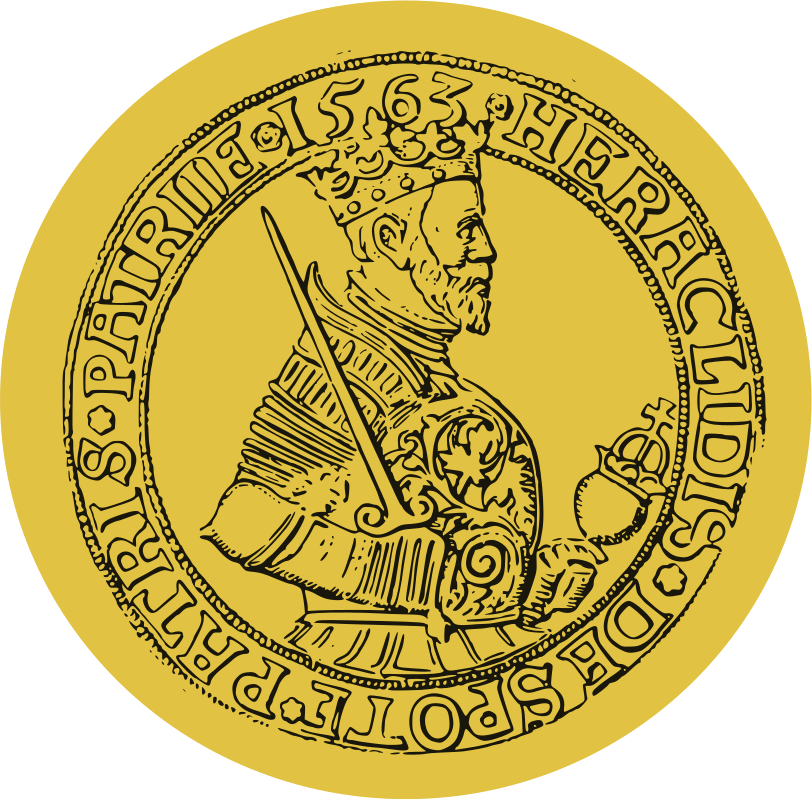
- Heraclid's portrait as Pater Patriae, on 1563 coinage

Prince (King) of Moldavia
- Reign: November 18, 1561 – November 4, 1563
- Predecessor: Alexandru Lăpușneanu
- Successor: Ștefan Tomșa
- Born: Jacob Basilicos; 1527; Birkirkara, Malta, Kingdom of Sicily
- Died: November 5, 1563 (aged 35–36); Areni field, Suceava, Moldavia
- Spouse: Gilette d'André (to 1554)
- Issue: Adoptive son (died ca. 1553); Cyprian Bazylik (adopted); Natural son or daughter (died 1563)
- Father: John Heraclides Basilicò
- Religion: Catholic (to ca. 1556); Lutheran (1556–1557?); Calvinist (1557–1561?); Unitarian (1561–1563?); No affiliation (1563)

Iacob Heraclid (or Eraclid; Greek: Ἰάκωβος Ἡρακλείδης; 1527 – November 5, 1563), born Basilicò and also known as Iacobus Heraclides, Heraclid Despotul, or Despot Vodă ("The Voivode Despot"), was a Greek Maltese soldier, adventurer and intellectual, who reigned as Prince of Moldavia from November 1561 to November 1563. He is remembered as a pioneer of the Protestant faith in Eastern Europe, a champion of Renaissance humanism, and a founder of academic life in Moldavia. Active within the Greek diaspora in several countries, he was a student of Hermodorus Lestarchus, and worked as a scribe alongside his cousin, Iakobos Diassorinos. Heraclid forged his genealogy several times, claiming to be a member of the Branković dynasty; he was more reliably related to the Byzantine nobility in Rhodes, and claimed the titular lordship of Samos. In the late 1540s and early '50s, he studied medicine at the University of Montpellier, and married a local. A duelist and alleged infanticide, Heraclid fled over the border with the Holy Roman Empire before he could be executed for murder. He was slowly won over by the Reformation, serving the Protestant princes of the Upper Saxon Circle.

During his travels in the Habsburg Netherlands, Heraclid was admitted to the court of Emperor Charles V, serving under him in the Last Italian War. He was made a Count Palatine and became a recognized authority on military matters, authoring several books in Neo-Latin. Returning to civilian life, he focused his attention on missionary activity, and networked with the leading Lutherans in Wittenberg, though he began sympathizing more with Calvinism. With recommendations from Philip Melanchthon, he traveled through Northern Europe and had a spell teaching mathematics at the University of Rostock. He eventually reached Poland and Lithuania by way of Prussia, focusing on a project to unite the local Evangelical and Calvinist Churches. His own Calvinism wavered at the court of Mikołaj "the Red" Radziwiłł: Heraclid turned to Radical Reformation, and adopted a Unitarian position, without abjuring publicly.

Networking between the Habsburg monarchy and Polish nobility, "Despot" was able to credibly claim the throne of Moldavia. Involved in an unsuccessful plot to assassinate the titular Prince, Alexandru Lăpușneanu, he returned with a mercenary army, winning at Verbia and taking Suceava. Upon gaining control of the country, he issued an edict of toleration, which favored the brief ascendancy of Moldavian Protestants. Heraclid never explicitly stated his affiliation, appeasing the dominant Moldavian Orthodox Church and performing the duties of an Orthodox monarch. He also formulated a political program which announced Romanian nationalism, promising to conquer Wallachia and Transylvania; he saw himself as a vassal of the Holy Roman Empire, and made several attempts to capture parts of the Transylvania in conjunction with the Habsburgs. Proclaiming himself a "King" or "Palatine" rather than a Prince, he invested efforts in a dynastic union with Wallachia, which he then briefly invaded. Despot's long-term goal was to obtain independence from the Ottoman Empire following a European-led "crusade".

Several religious controversies contributed to social unrest in Moldavia. Despot's prohibition of divorce, his lapses into Protestant iconoclasm and his fiscal policies all served to alienate the public; this conflict was aggravated by his plan to marry a Calvinist, which opened the prospect of a Protestant dynasty. Weakened by Despot's disputes with Olbracht Łaski and the Zaporozhian Cossacks, the regime was brought down by the pretender Ștefan Tomșa. After a months-long siege in Suceava, Despot surrendered and was immediately killed, probably by Tomșa's own hand. His Reformation project only survived through the small learning center he had set up at Cotnari, being dismantled in the 1580s; his family was decimated and scattered, though one adoptive son, Cyprian Bazylik, achieved fame in his own right. Despot's reign was cursed by the early Moldavian historians, but his overall contribution to Moldavia's Westernization, particularly cultural, is viewed by later scholars as meritorious. He reemerged as a favorite subject in modern Romanian literature, inspiring an 1879 drama by Vasile Alecsandri, and also appears in Maltese literature.

== Biography ==
=== Origins ===
It is certain that the future Prince of Moldavia was an ethnic Greek, but his exact origin is unclear. Despot was a noted forger, described by Romanian scholar Andrei Pippidi as an "ingenious charlatan" and "professional impostor". Historian Nicolae Iorga also mentions that Despot, an "unusual figure", claimed "rights to all princely thrones in existence." In his quest for recognition, he provided several conflicting accounts on his origins and early life, while also inventing a succession of conflicting genealogies. In separate and conflicting notices, he suggested that his place of birth was Rhodes or Samos, in the Ottoman Eyalet of the Archipelago; elsewhere, he also claimed Genoese Chios or Venetian Crete as his homeland. At least one witness heard him say that he was originally from the Kingdom of Sicily.

His family tree, published by Heraclid himself at Corona in 1558, claimed that he descended from Polycrates the Samian and the Branković dynasty, rulers of the Serbian Despotate. In 1562, the French diplomat Antoine de Petronel recorded Heraclid as a claimant "Despot of Serbia". Later in life, Heraclid more explicitly pretended that he was a nephew of Moldavia's Stephen the Great, while adding that he descended from the House of Lusignan. Pippidi identifies some reliable parts in Despot's genealogy, referring to his kinship with the Byzantine nobility of Rhodes and with potentates from the Duchy of Naxos—possibly including Nicholas III dalle Carceri, mistakenly identified by Despot as "Alexios".

Overall, Heraclid appears to have had a strong connection with Hospitaller Malta, with Maltese sources generally referring to him as Basilicus Melitensis or Basilico Maltese ("Basilicus the Maltese"). Giovanni Francesco Abela and Giuseppe Buonfiglio record his name under the Italian version, Basilicò; Pippidi reconstructs this as Jacob Basilicos. Another Neo-Latin source names him as Iacobus Vasilico di Marcheto. One account in the Maltese series suggests that Heraclid was born at Birkirkara, and, according to Pippidi, this should be regarded as certain. The Maltese origin is nuanced by Buonfiglio: he recounts that Basilicò was a Maltese Greek who claimed Rhodian descent. Based on this clue, Pippidi proposes that the Heraclides family had escaped to Malta during the taking of Rhodes, with the future Despot Vodă being born in exile in 1527. The future Prince's symbolic affiliation with Rhodes is also verified by other details: in 1548, he presented himself as belonging to the Roman Catholic Archdiocese of Rhodes. Pippidi argues that he only came to depict himself as owner of Samos because, "unlike Rhodes or Malta, it was available, having been deserted by its inhabitants".

One note from Despot's papers may indicate that he was the great-grandson of Caloiani Vasilico, who served the Byzantine Empire as a diplomat, shortly before the Fall of Constantinople, while also involving himself in trade with Moldavia. The latter tradition was perhaps continued by Despot's father, John Heraclides. Scholar Aleksander Kraushar once hypothesized that Despot was not in fact a son of John, but rather of shipowner Basilikos, who had helped John escape; in this reading, the Heraclides clan adopted Iacob upon Basilikos' death. According to historian Marie Kesterska Sergescu, "Kraushar's information stands to be corrected" by Iorga's later discoveries. Iacob himself circulated two accounts of John's life and death, claiming that he had been decapitated by the Ottomans, or alternatively by Moldavia's Prince Ștefăniță. The latter variant is viewed as more plausible by Pippidi, who notes that Despot named Hârlău as his father's place of death, and intended to consecrate a church on that spot.

According to some readings of sources, John had another son, Demetrios, who would later play a role in Despot's Moldavian career. Other authors describe the same Demetrios as an unrelated Serb or Greek. Historian Matei Cazacu identifies him with Dimitrije Ljubavić, a deacon and pioneer typographer who was primarily active in Wallachia. According to this author, the two men were companions and blood brothers, rather than siblings. An enemy of Despot, Ferenc Forgách, counted two Basilicò brothers, one of whom was a burglar; the other lived in Venetian Cyprus. Despot's family is known to have included a Greek scribe, Iakobos Diassorinos, who was Heraclid's cousin and political partner; an uncle, Constantine, had fallen prisoner to the Ottomans during the siege of Coron.

=== Scribe, student, fugitive ===
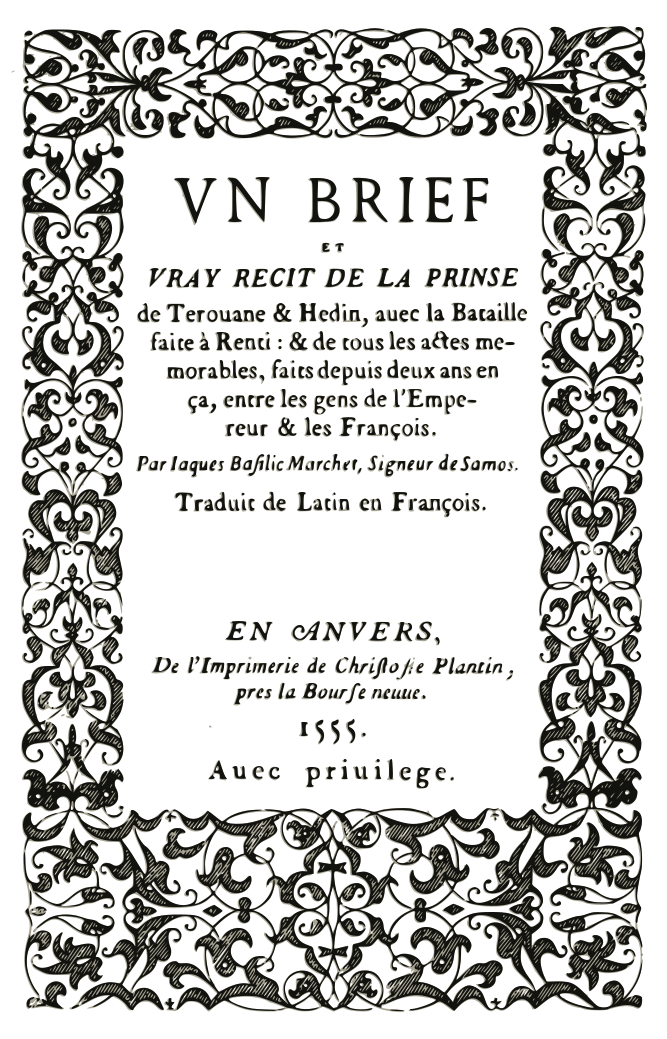
Title page of De Marini quod Terovanum vocant in Christophe Plantin's French edition, 1555. Heraclid is credited as "Jacques Basilic Marchet"

A passing mention by poet-chronicler Christian Schesaeus suggests that Despot's first language of instruction was "Argolic" Greek, and that his earliest travels took him to Italy. In adulthood, he could speak as many as six languages, which may or may not have included "Vlach". Several accounts of the period suggest that he was educated in Chios by Hermodorus Lestarchus, who introduced him to Renaissance humanism. In his record of oral history, the 18th-century author Ion Neculce alleges that Heraclid became a servant of the Brankovićes, with whom he "was not relatives". He claims that Despot passed himself as Jovan Branković's nephew when it could obtain him a share of the family's inheritance, and also alleges that he stole and forged Branković's personal papers. This story would place young Heraclid in the Republic of Venice or the Papal States. Antonio Maria Graziani, a diplomat of the Holy See, additionally argues that Heraclid had spent time as a copyist in the Vatican Library, though he may be confusing him with Diassorinos. Iorga draws a slightly different conclusion: noting that both Despot and Diassorinos were scribes and calligraphers, he argues that they only worked for the Bibliotheca Regia in Vienna.

Iorga proposes that Heraclid also spent some of his formative years in Habsburg Spain. According to scholar Eugen Denize, the hypothesis is unverified, but plausible—given Despot's familiarity with Spanish politics. He was later spotted in the Kingdom of France, meeting and befriending Justus Jonas, who probably introduced him to Reformation ideology. In 1548, he enlisted at the University of Montpellier, where he trained as a physician. A university colleague, Carolus Clusius, left notes regarding his encounters with Despot, whom he names as Jacques Marchetti. Clusius depicts Despot as a philanderer and duelist, who married Gilette d'André, widow of a former rival. He accuses the future Prince of infanticide: he had arranged for a wardrobe to fall on his adoptive child.

"Marchetti" was forced to abscond from Languedoc and France, without completing his studies. Clusius implies that this was because of his criminal lifestyle, while Felix Plater, also a student at Montpellier, suggests that Despot had killed a canon for mocking Gilette. Platter also recalls that Heraclid was tried in absentia, sentenced to death by crushing, and executed in effigy on September 28, 1554. There is no explicit mention of whether or not Heraclid was involved with the Huguenots. However, this religious component may explain why Heraclid hid in the Margraviate of Baden, sheltered there by the Protestant Philibert. From Baden, Heraclid traveled to the Upper Saxon Circle of the Holy Roman Empire, in areas dominated by Lutheran Landeskirchen. He spent some ten months with the Counts of Mansfeld, meeting Günther the Rich and Philip Melanchthon.

Historians debate as to whether or not Heraclid joined Günther on his travel to the Kingdom of England, but it is certain that he visited the Habsburg Netherlands. In 1553, at Brussels, Emperor Charles V recognized him as a military expert and took him into his own retinue. In the campaigns of 1554–1555, Heraclid saw action with the Reichsarmatur in the County of Flanders and at Thérouanne. He also made a decisive appearance in the battle of Renty. According to chronicler Jean-François Le Petit, "Baſilic Marchet, Greek Gentleman & Captain" contributed to the counterattack which forced Henry II to withdraw his army.

His competence was again recognized by Charles. On October 22, 1555, Heraclid was received into the lesser German nobility as a Count Palatine, with hereditary rights over Samos and Paros. Thereafter styling himself "Despot of Samos and Marquess of Paros", he was also entitled to a pension and military retinue at the emperor's expense. His participation in the siege of Thérouanne inspired him to write a book in Latin (De Marini quod Terovanum vocant atque Hedini expugnatione), which he dedicated to the Emperor's son and main successor, Philip II. This was later followed by Artis militaris liber primus ("The First Book on Military Art") and De arte militaria liber ("Book on the Military Art"). As argued by Denize, all three showed "a very good awareness of Spanish military art"; art historian Răzvan Theodorescu makes remarks on their "Renaissance taste". Medievalist Ștefan Olteanu praises Heraclid's military competence and "genuine theoretical skills", while writer Félix Le Sergeant de Monnecove deems Despot (or "Jacques Basilic Marchet") the writer "too personal and partial to be viewed as a historian". The first of these fascicles was published at Antwerp in 1555, and then the various parts were circulated as manuscripts which are "similar, but not identical".

=== Soldier and missionary ===
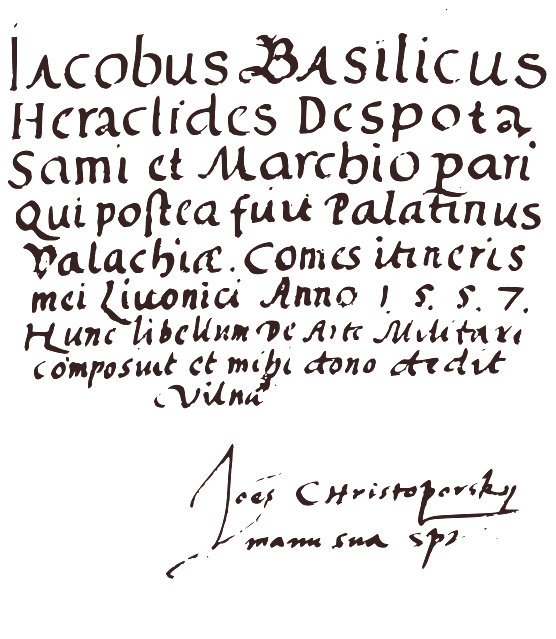
Title page of De arte militari, by "Iacobus Basilicus Heraclides Despota", with John Christoporski's signature, attesting Heraclides' participation in the 1557 clashes with the Livonian Order

By 1556, Heraclid was certainly a Protestant, settling in Wittenberg, capital of the eponymous duchy and the epicenter of Lutheranism. Here, he met Joachim Camerarius and Caspar Peucer, as well as, possibly, Pier Paolo Vergerio. As noted by historian Maria Crăciun, Heraclid was the first Greek man to contact German Lutherans, appearing to them as the "symbol of a future rapprochement between the Greek church of the East and Central Europe's German Protestantism." According to Clusius, it was at Wittenberg that Despot first developed an interest for the affairs of Moldavia and Wallachia. In mid 1556, Despot switched his attention to the Kingdom of Poland and Duchy of Prussia, involving himself in the affairs of the Polish Evangelical Church. With letters of recommendation from Melanchthon (which described Despot as an "honest and erudite man"), he crossed into Mecklenburg-Schwerin, teaching mathematics at the University of Rostock. He may have also spent time in Lübeck and in the Danish realm, and in any case one of his letters from Melanchthon was addressed to Christian III. There are also clues that he visited the Kingdom of Sweden before finally sailing to Königsberg in Prussia, where he arrived in November 1556.

At the Prussian court, Heraclid met statesman John Christoporski (Krzysztoforski), who took an interest in his contributions as a tactician and ordered copies from his tracts. Duke Albert also gave Heraclid a warm welcome, but the latter only spent some two months in Prussia, leaving upon obtaining a recommendation to the court of Chancellor Mikołaj "the Red" Radziwiłł, in Lithuania. Despot also fought alongside Christoporski in the clashes of 1557, opposing Poland to the Livonian Order. From Vilnius, where he met other the major figures of Polish Protestantism—including Jan Łaski—, Heraclid traveled to Lesser Poland Province, and made occasional returns to Prussia. In late 1557, he was in Kraków, where he befriended scientist Georg Joachim Rheticus and a number of Protestant campaigners—including Hieronim Filipowski, Francesco Lismanini, Stanisław Lutomirski, and Marcin Zborowski; his project, masterminded by Łaski, was to reunite Evangelical and Calvinist Churches into a single Polish national church.

Beyond his generic Protestantism, Heraclid's own church affiliation is an enduring subject of dispute. The general viewpoints, summarized by Maria Crăciun, are that he was either a Lutheran, a Calvinist, or an opportunist with no clear commitments; a number of authors also list him as one of the Unitarians or Polish Brethren, with some noting that he came to these positions only after going through more mainstream Protestantism. Crăciun believes that the most plausible account is provided by theologian Hans Petri. This theory describes young Heraclide as a moderate Lutheran, who embraced the dissident views of Andreas Osiander while in Prussia, and finally became a Calvinist in Kraków. Crăciun suggests that Radziwiłł's influence pushed Despot into a final, Nontrinitarian stage, with influences from both Unitarianism and the Polish Brethren. Graziani reported on views allegedly held by Despot, commenting on his anticlericalism, his derision of all forms of mass, refusal to believe in transubstantiation, and dedication to Bible study. Various Catholic polemicists identified Heraclid as a "Jew" or "not a Christian". As Crăciun notes, this allegation refers to his Unitarian views, which in the popular mind had been identified with Judaizing currents.

=== Moldavian intrigue ===
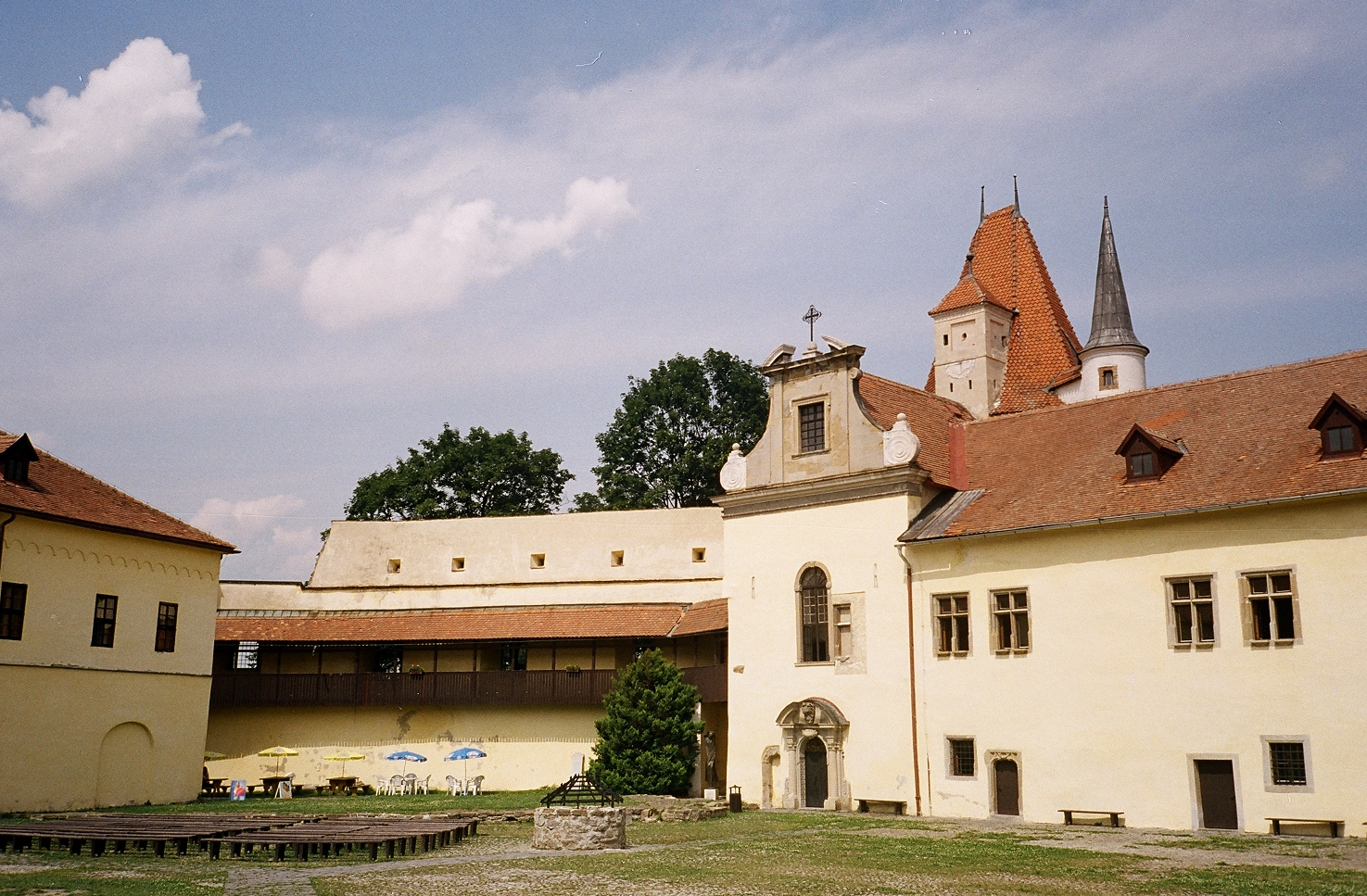
Olbracht Łaski's castle in Kesmark (Kežmarok), where Despot planned his attack on Moldavia

Despot's plan to take over as Prince of Moldavia by usurping Alexandru Lăpușneanu was probably hatched at Vilnius: here, he met some Moldavian boyars who had escaped Lăpușneanu's political persecutions. By 1558, he had also become aware that his genealogical claims made him a nominal relative of Princess-consort Ruxandra. Scholar Tadeusz Gostyński proposes that one of Łaski's clients, Cyprian z Sieradza, approached Heraclid with a sketched-out conquest of Moldavia. Gostyński proposes that this is why Despot adopted Cyprian, who was consequently known in Poland as "Bazylik". Historian Șerban Papacostea argues that Demetrios settled in Moldavia long before Despot, contributing to the spread of Reformation ideas in that country before being chased out by Lăpușneanu's violent repression. Iacob himself arrived in Moldavia in 1558, already an adversary of the regime, probably with support from Poland (especially from Polish Calvinists) and from a coalition of boyars who had supported Ștefan VI Rareș.

As noted by Olteanu, Heraclid's plan was rendered realistic by the anarchic decline of political customs in both Danubian Principalities under the Ottoman dominion. In the very last decades of the Romanian Middle Ages, there were 21 Moldavian Princes, with each averaging "2 years of actual governance." Emperor Charles' other successor, Ferdinand I, was preoccupied with securing a Habsburg family realm in Central and Eastern Europe. His son Maximilian intended to stand in the Polish royal elections; he courted the Polish nobility, whose Protestant factions conditioned their support on Habsburg acceptance of Despot. This overlapped with Heraclid's own political goals, prompting him to assure the Habsburg court of his loyalty. It is unclear if Ferdinand actually backed Despot during the late 1550s. Historian Ionel Bejenaru, who argues that they did, notes that Lăpușneanu perceived Despot as an imperial agent, and that this pushed him to enter negotiations with Ferdinand. Iorga describes Despot as a "useful diversion", which Ferdinand prepared for its perfect moment to deploy.

According to Iorga, Despot was a guest at Lăpușneanu's court, charming his hosts with his accounts of Western Europe, and with his own genealogical fabrications, while omitting his criminal past. Probably just before the attempted Moldavian–Habsburg rapprochement, Heraclid conspired to poison the Prince—a plot which also involved the Unitarian physician, Giorgio Biandrata, and the Orthodox Patriarch, Joasaph II. The attempt was a failure, and Despot was forced to flee Moldavia; according to Iorga, this escape occurred as early as 1558, though Crăciun calculates early 1560. Initially, he settled in the Eastern Hungarian Kingdom at the court of Dowager Queen Isabella Jagiellon. It was here that he first met a fellow adventurer, Olbracht Łaski.

In Iorga's account, this was also the time of Despot's stay in Corona, and subsequent move to Zips County, in the Habsburg parts of Hungary. He arrived at Kesmark, where he lodged in Łaski's castle. On March 3, 1560, Despot made his formal pledge to the Habsburgs. As read by historian Gheorghe Gonța, this oath marked a "peak of Habsburg intrusions in Moldavia", and also signaled Despot's "complete openness toward the Occident". By May, Lăpușneanu had alienated more of his boyars and probably even the Moldavian Orthodox Metropolis: a delegation representing both traveled to Kesmark, hoping to persuade Ferdinand and Maximilian to intervene, and also expressing support for Despot's candidacy.

Arranging a new expedition in Moldavia, planned for late 1560, Heraclid secured military backing from castellan Łaski, who had an understanding with Habsburg loyalists. Despot promised him ownership of Hotin Citadel, which guaranteed rights to the biggest octroi in all of Moldavia. After mortgaging his own estates, Łaski also lent 10,000 ducats to the pretender. Despot bought himself a garrison of Spanish arquebusiers. Led by a Captain Pierre Roussel (or Rossillio), these remained loyal to him to the last day of his rule. Some 500 Polish Protestants came in as volunteers. News of this reached Polish King Sigismund II Augustus, who, preferring to maintain Lăpușneanu as his subservient ally, ordered this "mutiny" quashed. Despot's force was attacked by troops from the Ruthenian Voivodeship, and arrested by Mikołaj Sieniawski before even reaching the Moldavian border. During this backlash, Despot dulled his enemies' vigilance by staging his own death.

=== Deposing Lăpușneanu ===
Approximate route of Heraclid's invasion of Moldavia in 1561

The final expedition against Lăpușneanu was probably supported from outside the country by Demetrios. Despot acquired an explicit Polish endorsement, and was probably also viewed favorably by the Sublime Porte, having reportedly spent some 20,000 Goldgulden on bribes. Crucial backing for Heraclid's bid came from Joseph Nasi, the Ottoman court Jew and titular Duke of Naxos, who was on his way to becoming "one of the most influential figures at the Porte". Abela and Buonfiglio both claim that Heraclid was a vassal of the Knights Hospitaller, having been propped up by Grand Master Jean Parisot de Valette. Pippidi believes that this act of fealty is not unlikely, but also notes that Heraclid may have paid similar homage to other European monarchs. Historian Robert Mifsud Bonnici argues that Heraclid may have returned to Malta as a monarch, to meet with Valette. However, according to Pippidi, it is improbable that such an encounter ever took place.

Despot now had a larger force—comprising many Zaporozhian Cossacks, on one of their first-ever appearances in Moldavian history. Łaski mobilized this multinational force with his Latin oratory, depicting them as a liberation force, and Lăpușneanu as a tyrant. On November 18 (Old Style: November 8), 1561, Despot's coalition defeated the Moldavian military forces in the Battle of Verbia, obtaining full control over much of the country. In his biography of Heraclid, Johann Sommer noted that arquebus firepower won the day: "most of [the Moldavians] had never before even seen those handheld bombards, and so they and their horses could catch sound of them without the greatest distress." Despot was also favored by an act of betrayal: the Moldavian Ion Moțoc, with his entire cavalry force, switched sides during the clashes. A secondary fight opposed Hungarians in Despot's service to Lăpușneanu's contracted Janissaries. The latter barricaded themselves in the townhouses of Botoșani, but the Hungarians surprised them by leaping over fences, and decimated them.

Despot and his men soon descended on the capital, Suceava, where Metropolitan Grigorie II de la Neamț and "all the populace" stepped out to greet him. Lăpușneanu escaped from battle and took refuge in Silistra Eyalet, at Kilya; the Ottoman garrison of that town had him deported to Istanbul. The final pursuit took Despot to Huși, where he defeated another portion of the loyalist army, and finally to Vaslui. On December 2, he issued his edict of toleration toward all branches of Christianity, inviting Protestants who were persecuted elsewhere to join him in Moldavia. Despot immediately canceled Lăpușneanu's program of forced conversions to Orthodoxy and restored Protestant churches to their owners, being celebrated as a protector by the Hungarian, Saxon, and Armenian communities of Moldavia. He personally appointed a bishop for the Saxon Lutheran Church, whose first task was to rebuild churches demolished by either Rareș or Lăpușneanu. Shortly after his takeover, Despot wrote Ferdinand to convince him never to back Lăpușneanu, exposing the latter as an indiscriminate murderer and Orthodox fanatic, and dwelling on his impalement of seven Protestant missionaries.

In other portions of the Vaslui edict, Despot hints at the origin of the Romanians, encouraging his boyars to live up to the Roman virtue of their ancestors. He reassured locals that he was fundamentally anti-Ottoman, promising them that he would restore Moldavian rule in the Budjak, also announcing that he intended to annex Wallachia and then "Greece"—described by some historians as a "Dacian" plan. According to Iorga, there was a more discreet note to this program: though his proclamations described the Danube as a frontier, Despot's "grand apotheosis" was to be a restoration of the Byzantine Empire, with himself as "Emperor of all Eastern Christendom".

=== Transylvanian projects ===
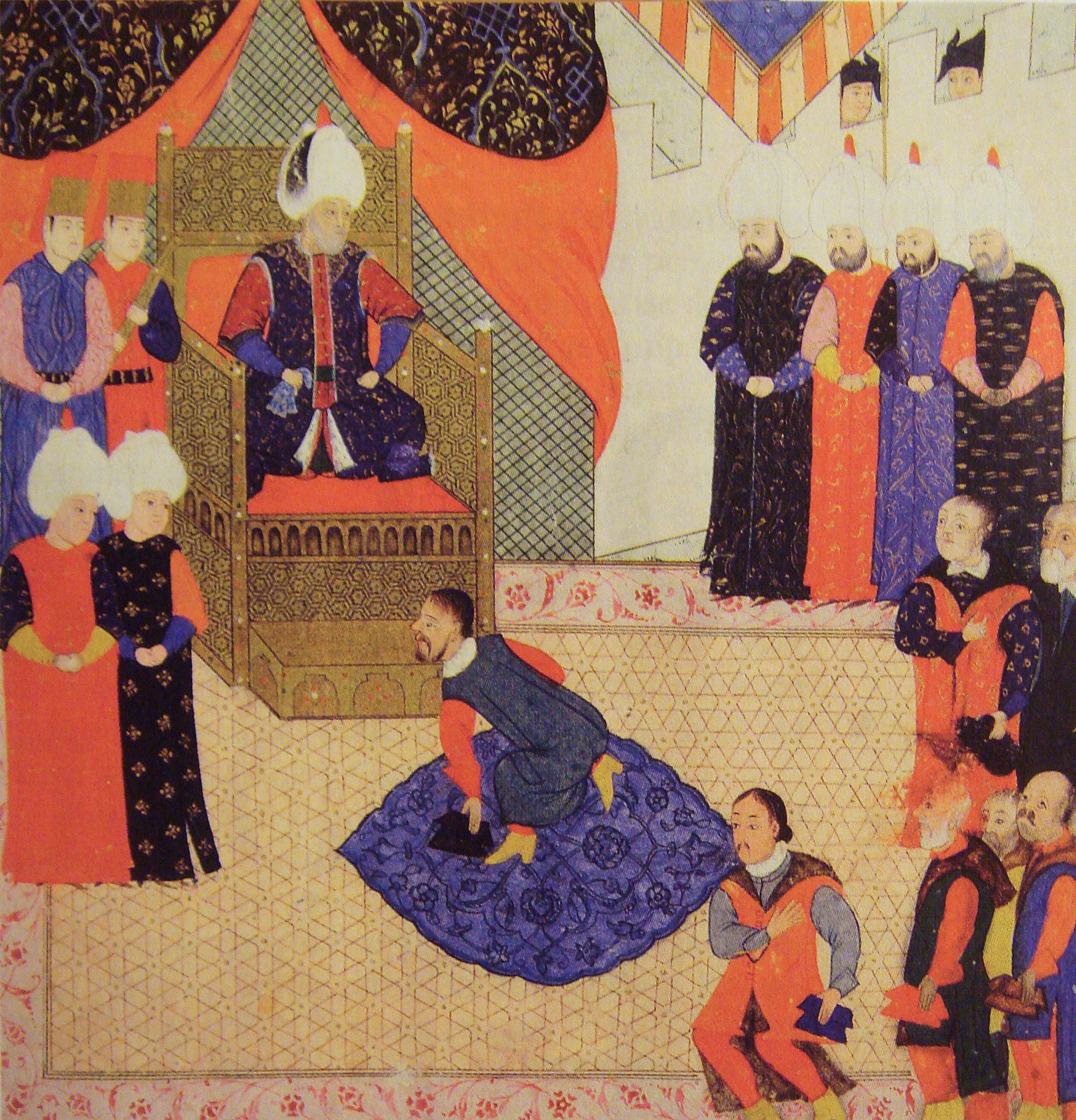
John Sigismund Zápolya paying homage to Suleiman the Magnificent in 1566. From a late 16th-century muraqqa

In January–February 1562, the Prince became involved in the effort to absorb Eastern Hungary into Ferdinand's realm. He contributed to the deteriorating relations between the two camps by stating his own territorial claims in Transylvania, demanding the return of Ciceu and Cetatea de Baltă, and preparing a favorite of his to serve as Transylvania's puppet ruler. In the Habsburg parts of Hungary, Zsigmond Thorda described Despot as a most reliable ally who, it was hoped, would counteract and help discipline the Eastern Hungarians. The Moldavian troops, Thorda reported, were fully loyal to, and financially supported by, the Habsburgs; however, they could not be used against Eastern Hungary, for fear of angering Despot's Ottoman overlords. Diplomat Ferenc Zay was more enthusiastic about the project, arguing that Despot could incapacitate resistance by attacking in Partium while the Habsburgs took other regions. After confronting both sides of the argument, on February 15 Ferdinand appointed Ogier Ghiselin de Busbecq as his rapporteur on the Moldavian matter. On the Eastern Hungarian side, Gábor Majláth began gathering troops in preparation for Despot's expected intervention.

Sultan Suleiman the Magnificent finally recognized Despot as his vassal on April 24, with a ceremony outside Suceava. The affair was not without some tensions: Kapucu Ferhat, who presented Despot with his "regnal banner", received from him a bribe of some 15,000 ducats and 100 horses; however, Ferhat still complained to the Sultan that the ceremony had been held indoors, which went against customary law. As noted by Iorga, Despot was embarrassed by the ceremony, and in his correspondence pretended that the "banner" signified an Ottoman order of chivalry, rather than a label of submission. Before May 1562, Suleiman, as overlord of both Moldavia and Eastern Hungary, ordered Despot and John Sigismund Zápolya to settle their differences. The monarchs complied, with Despot concealing his Habsburg sympathies and addressing letters of friendship to Zápolya.

Heraclid maintained his objectives and, as early as June 1562, sent letters to Székely Land, encouraging its secession and union with Moldavia; his mercenary friend, Anton Székely, was entrusted with the planning of a revolt. Chronicler Nicolae Costin claims that, once informed that Zápolya had been incapacitated by illness, Despot marched his 700-strong army toward the Transylvanian border; news of Zápolya's recovery arrested his advance, somewhere on the Trotuș River. He eventually backed out of his invasion plan, sending the boyar Orăș to negotiate a peace between Zápolya and the Székelys. However, he gave a free hand to another one of his mercenaries, Paul Székely, to act as a seemingly independent warlord of Székely Land; this scenario was prevented by Zápolya, who resumed control of the areas before autumn. Around that time, Despot began sending envoys, including his confidant Pierre Roussel, to the courts of Western Europe, requesting support for an anti-Ottoman crusade. He also defied the Crimean Khanate, reducing the Moldavian annual tribute to a gift consisting of two honey barrels, and made a public show of his contempt for Ottoman merchants.

Despot had fathered an illegitimate son by "a Greek woman", or, according to other readings, had an infant daughter. He also wanted to have a more conventional line of succession. During the first half of 1562, he planned his marriage to Princess Dobra, sister of Peter the Younger, Prince of Wallachia. For this he approached Peter's mother, Doamna Chiajna. His envoys were Moțoc and Avram Banilovschi. These two arranged for the dynastic union to take place in August, and brought back a diamond ring as Peter and Chiajna's gift for Heraclid. Later, Wallachia's Vornic Radu Socol traveled to Suceava, bringing Despot two steeds, a kuka hat with precious stones, and 24,000 ducats. Heraclid intended to make his wedding a grand ceremony. His "extravagant parvenu's idea" involved sending out invitations to the leading royal houses of Europe. Among the projected guests were Philip II, Duke Albert, and Hungarian Archbishop Nicolaus Olahus.

The wedding was eventually called off, prompting a swift deterioration in relations between Wallachia and Moldavia. Historians disagree on the reasons for this breakdown in negotiations. Claudiu Neagoe believes that Chiajna was probably informed that Despot intended to depose Peter and bring his own alleged brother, Demetrios, on that throne. Cătălin Pungă notes that Demetrios was not supported by Heraclid; he argues that the Wallachians no longer saw Despot as a viable choice. Another project pursued by Despot was to establish a personal union between Moldavia and a restored Kingdom of Cyprus. Also in 1562, the Venetians captured and executed Diassorinos, who was instigating a Cypriote revolt and had asked for Maltese and Ottoman assistance—Despot probably intended to make Cyprus an Ottoman client state.

=== Proselytism controversy ===
Map of the Reformation and Counter-Reformation in Moldavia, showing the minority Calvinist, Catholic, and Hussite groups

"Despot's mission", Crăciun notes, "was to execute, in one go, the Protestant policy of Wittenberg and of the Polish nobility, together with the Emperor's anti-Ottoman policy. [...] Despot was depicted as a determining factor for the spread of Protestantism in the east". Already in December 1561, Despot had extended an invitation to Filipowski, Lismanini, and other Polish colleagues, urging them to visit Moldavia. Soon after, the regime introduced new laws and customs, including an effective ban on divorces. This policy was also reflected in the theology of a Protestant preacher, Jan Lusinski, who arrived in Moldavia as bishop of the local Calvinists; Lusinski and his German colleague, Johann Sommer, evolved from Calvinism or Lutheranism to a Unitarian approach, which they also imposed on their congregation.

Heraclid made repeated attempts to establish Moldavia as an educational center of Eastern European Reformation, inviting Lestarchus, Jonas, Rheticus, and Peucer to come and teach there. Sommer was director of Despot's collegium (or "academy"), set up at Cotnari. This establishment was designed to train a generation of Protestant preachers, and possibly also the administrative elites. Demetrios also made his return to Moldavia, probably in January 1562, interrupting his wider mission to spread Protestantism in the Balkans. He set up base at Cotnari, where he taught Greek. As Crăciun notes, it remains a matter of scholarly debate whether Cotnari should be viewed as Moldavia's first institution of higher learning, a local replica of the Platonic Academy, or a mere school. As Sommer himself explained, Despot offered state scholarships to Moldavia's youth. Historians disagree on whether this meant that the regime was consciously drawing them away from Orthodoxy, or simply indifferent to their beliefs.

The princely court and government apparatus included Logothete Luca Stroici, who had probably embraced Lutheranism. However, various researchers agree that Despot never made an effort to mass-convert the Orthodox population. Overall, he allowed Reformation ideas to appear in the mainstream, giving Moldavians a chance to come into direct contact with them, and hoping that they would convert on their own. Polish reports and his own letters attest that he had pledged himself to make Moldavia Protestant, but also show that he never delivered on that promise. One point of the program which was consistently pursued by Despot was the repression of Moldavian Catholicism: his transfer of Catholic property into Lutheran hands was recorded by Giovanni Botero and Jan Dymitr Solikowski.

Despot was still probably on friendly terms with Grigorie II, though the lesser clergy slowly came to resent both of them. As shown by the contemporary Chronicle of Azarie, Moldavians understood him to be "of the same creed as his advisers", namely a "Lutheran" and "God's scourge". The Orthodox Nicolae Costin took a dim view of Despot's stance on divorces, concluding that it made him an "awful, unrepentant tyrant". Despot angered his subjects when he began confiscating reliquaries, rizas and chalices, melting them for bullion. This remained his one documented attack on Orthodox institutions: primarily patrimonial in nature, it also reflected Despot's intention to simplify religious practice. In Orthodox and Catholic historiography, the confiscations were also regarded as proof of Despot's Protestant iconoclasm.

Heraclid was aware of the mounting hostility. He survived several assassination attempts, masterminded by Lăpușneanu: in April 1562, he had Hussar Voina impaled for such an attempt in the city of Roman; in 1563, there were two other documented strikes, occurring during his military maneuvers. His clampdown on dissent included the killing of Andreica, a former Stolnic, whom he regarded as a serious competitor for the throne. His lynching was staged by the Hungarian garrison of Suceava on Saint George Day 1562, and applauded by a handpicked civilian audience. Administrative letters show that, during early 1562, the Prince and Łaski had imprisoned some seven grand boyars, effectively purging his Boyar Council; later documents suggest that they were killed in custody.

However, Despot still kept his Protestant faith secret, or not immediately apparent, performing the actions of an Orthodox monarch—including taking part in the Epiphany and bowing to kiss the Gospel. In March 1562, he restored to Humor Monastery the estate of Feredeni, which he had confiscated from Andreica. Also that year, he gave a rude reception to Wolfgang Schreiber, sent by Hans von Ungnad on a mission to convert Orthodox Christians to Lutheranism. His veto effectively took Moldavia out of the project to establish a Protestant presence in Eastern Europe at large. Crăciun proposes that this episode reflects, on one hand, Despot's attempt to placate his Orthodox subjects and, on the other, his growing and genuine dislike of the Magisterial Reformation.

=== "King" and Polish vassal ===
In October 1562, Heraclid invaded Wallachia and routed the Wallachian army sent to repel him. He was styling himself "palatine of Wallachia", probably hinting that he wanted to incorporate both territories into the Holy Roman Empire, with himself as the intermediate vassal. He now also intended to place a "son of Basarab" on the Wallachian throne, as a puppet ruler; historians agree that this is a reference to Banul Mărăcine or Nicolaus Bassaraba, two exiled Craiovești. Despot made a public show of his supposedly precognitive dream, in which three angels brought him three crowns, or, in the version provided by the 17th-century chronicler Miron Costin, "two gilded crowns [fell] from the skies for him to take". Despot actually owned two such crowns, which, according to Papacostea, stood for the Upper and Lower Countries of Moldavia; they were later lost. In June 1562, Despot accused the mercenary Jean Villey of having stolen all his regalia.

In tandem, Zápolya made efforts to convince the Porte that Heraclid was a Habsburg loyalist who conspired with Emperor Ferdinand, noting that "this Despot has manned the forts with Germans and Hungarians", and that "all bandits from Transylvania and Poland gathered under him". The solution, Zápolya argued, could only be Lăpușneanu's return to his throne. During this exchange of information, the Porte discovered that its Hungarian correspondence had been copied and read by Ferdinand's regents, which sparked a brief diplomatic crisis, at the end of which Suleiman insisted that Ferdinand remove his mercenaries from Moldavia. Ferdinand complied, and Despot was only left with 800 non-German mercenaries, most of them Hungarian. Faced with Zápolya's intrigues and Chiajna's complaints, Despot also withdrew his troops from Wallachia. Nevertheless, the itinerant jurist Simon Wirt recorded a rumor that Despot (referred to as Desparity) had persuaded Suleiman the Magnificent to arrest Lăpușneanu and make him a galley slave.

On January 6, 1563, Despot made another display of his respect for Orthodoxy, with a coronation ceremony at Suceava Cathedral. According to Iorga, Despot was an "actor" who "altogether lived too little in the real world", and his ambitions (such as inviting all neighboring monarchs to witness his anointment) "would normally stir laughter." In some Protestant sources, the ceremony at Suceava was perceived as a betrayal, and equated with an Orthodox baptism. At the coronation and after, Despot reportedly used a non-traditional title, that of Moldavian "King". In addition to coins, he minted for himself a new crown and a distinguishing seal. His portrait on coinage also had a circlet, a sword, and a scepter, and carried his dedication as Herclis Despote Patris Patriae. Various other documents have him as more simply Ioan ("John") and "Voivode": Іѡн Воєвода was his signature in Church Slavonic, Iohann Waiwoda was one of his Latin names. While Ioan was in regular use as a regnal particle for all Princes, it was extremely rare as an actual name.

His matrimonial projects then shifted focus, with Despot contemplating a stronger alliance with Polish nobility. He courted a daughter of Marcin Zborowski, sending some of his mercenaries to retrieve her, but his conflicts with the magnates put a stop to all such overtures. Also in January, Despot designated Łaski as his heir, though this recognition was conditioned on the Prince having no legitimate male children. Over the following weeks, their relationship tottered over payments of Despot's debts to Łaski. By February, Despot had cancelled Łaski's deed to Hotin, and put in his own garrison, ensuring himself against an attack from the rear. Despot centered his attempts on obtaining an understanding with the government of Poland. Sigismund Augustus had since been persuaded that Moldavia was not a threat to him and his own uneasy peace with the Ottomans. Also in 1563, Despot renewed Lăpușneanu's oath of fealty to the Polish crown. This document confirmed Moldavia's obligation to supply Poland with 7,000 soldiers, including in the event of war with the Ottomans.

At that stage, Moldavians were also enraged by Despot's new tax of a ducat on every household. By July, although he had duly paid his country's tribute (the haraç), Despot was also a persona non grata at the Porte. Papacostea and other authors believe that Despot's downfall was nevertheless accelerated by another factor, namely his pledge to marry Zborowski's daughter. It signified to the boyars that Despot wished to set up a Protestant dynasty in an Orthodox country. The rebels' indictment of the Prince specifically cited him as an enemy of God's law. In a June 1563 document, Despot refers to his succession line as: "whomever of Our children or of Our house is to become hospodar, or whoever God will select to rule upon Our land of Moldavia".

=== Downfall and assassination ===
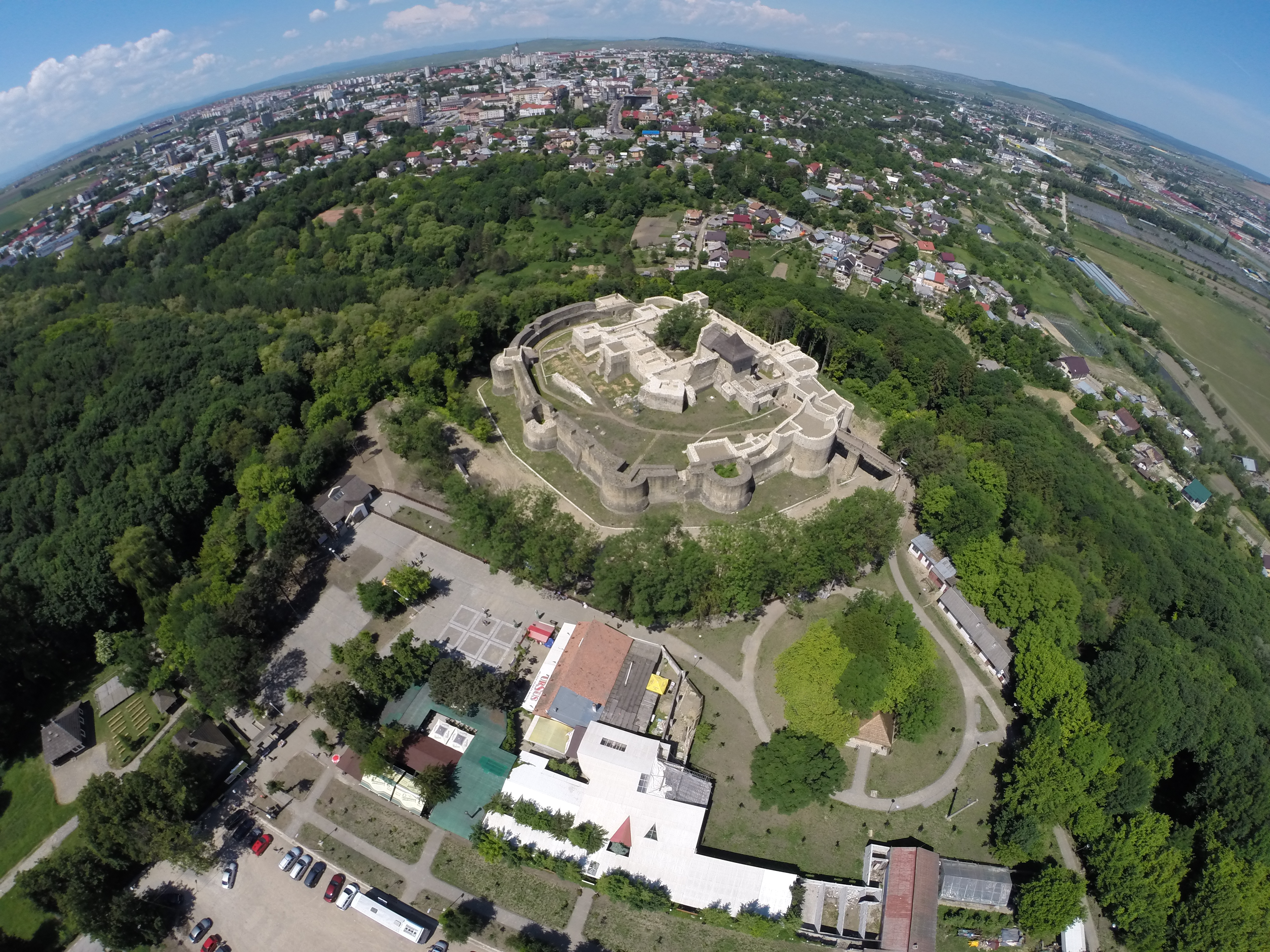
Aerial view over Suceava's princely citadel from the western side. Areni field once stretched on the left-hand side and in the background

Schesaeus and Mathias Miles recount a failed attempt on Despot's life—as the culmination of a plot uniting clergymen, including Metropolitan Grigorie, and boyars. At the Eucharist of 1563, the plotters mixed the sacramental bread with poison. Despot was saved by a deserting conspirator, who made sure that Despot would not touch the bread, and invited the clergy to have first servings; according to Miles, all of them, including Grigorie, died within hours of the meal. Schesaeus believes that only "the monks" were poisoned, while boyars were ambushed and stabbed to death by loyalist mercenaries.

In its final form, the plot centered on Hatman Ștefan Tomșa and Moțoc, who co-opted a deserting courtier, Iosif Veveriță. Another Hatman, Toma Barnovschi, formerly seen as Despot's "Viceroy", was reportedly threatened with bodily harm in order to join that conspiracy. In another conspiratorial action, the boyars managed to poison Lusinski, who was then buried outside Suceava. During that summer, Dmytro Vyshnevetsky, Hetman of the Zaporizhian Sich, intervened in Moldavia with the probable intention of seizing Despot's throne. Alarmed, Despot offered Vyshnevetsky peace, promising a gift of 1,000 horses and some thousands of oxen. Although supported by Łaski, Vyshnevetsky's forces were finally crushed. One account suggests that Vyshnevetsky and Łaski quarreled; the former reached an understanding with Despot, and was delivered by Łaski into Tomșa's hands. The Zaporizhian Hetman was then dispatched to Istanbul, and impaled on hooks.

The army that had defeated Vyshnevetsky then besieged Despot at Suceava for some three months. The boyars had ambushed many of Despot's mercenaries, having invited them to a staged celebration at Sipoteni. In parallel, Tomșa encouraged an anti-Protestant pogrom, which exterminated Lusinski's widow and child, Despot's son, and a number of Cotnari's Calvinist families. Main targets also included Armenian women, after some were caught praying for Despot's well-being. Sommer recounts that these events came just as Lestarchus, finally answering Despot's invitation, was preparing to enter the country, prompting the scholar to return home. There were several aborted moves to restore the old regime. One version is that Łaski switched sides again, returning to serve Despot and the Habsburg cause in exchange for the return of Hotin. Other authors argue that this never happened, despite Despot's desperate attempts. A more sustained effort came from a Habsburg envoy, Melchior Balassa.

Inside Suceava, Heraclid believed that he was facing a mutiny of his infantrymen, and executed their leader, Captain Devay or Dervici. Reportedly, the decision was rash, and actually pushed the troops into rebellion. The chronicler Grigore Ureche reports that the survivors intended to take their revenge and kill Despot, but feared that they would be decapitated for treason. Eventually, the Hungarian mercenaries inside Suceava turned against Despot, exhausting his capacity for resistance. The Prince then prepared his surrender. His physician, Dyonisus d'Avalos, claimed that just hours before his death, he renounced and denounced Reformation as a whole, deploring his own role in the "mockery of the divine religion" and voicing the wish to withdraw to a monastery. This narrative is partly corroborated in Catholic reports of the period, which claim that Despot's final wish was to be ordained. According to Crăciun, the exhibition was insincere, a final act in the constant dissimulation of Heraclid's Protestant or Unitarian faith.

Despot's surrender and death are dated to November 4–5, 1563. He stepped out of the fortress, dressed in full regalia, and walked or rode toward his enemies. Ureche recounts that Despot met Tomșa just outside the city walls, on the open fields of Areni. In anticipation, the rebel leader had gathered here the estates of the realm, to approve of his own coronation. According to various accounts, Tomșa personally killed Despot in front of the assembly, striking him with a mace. Ureche and Schesaeus suggest that death came not from the blow itself, but from being left to bleed. Other sources contrarily note that Despot was killed by one or several executioners. An 18th-century chronicle reports that Despot's body was taken for burial at Putna Monastery, but this contradicts sources which say that his grave was dug at Areni. Schesaeus notes that Despot had been reduced to pieces by the "rabid crowd", whereas Sommer only recalls that Despot's severed head was embalmed and sent as a gift to Istanbul. As this occurred, Tomșa also arrested Demetrios, but pardoned him, marking his nose with a cut—since mutilation technically invalidated him from ever taking the throne.

== Legacy ==
=== Aftermath ===
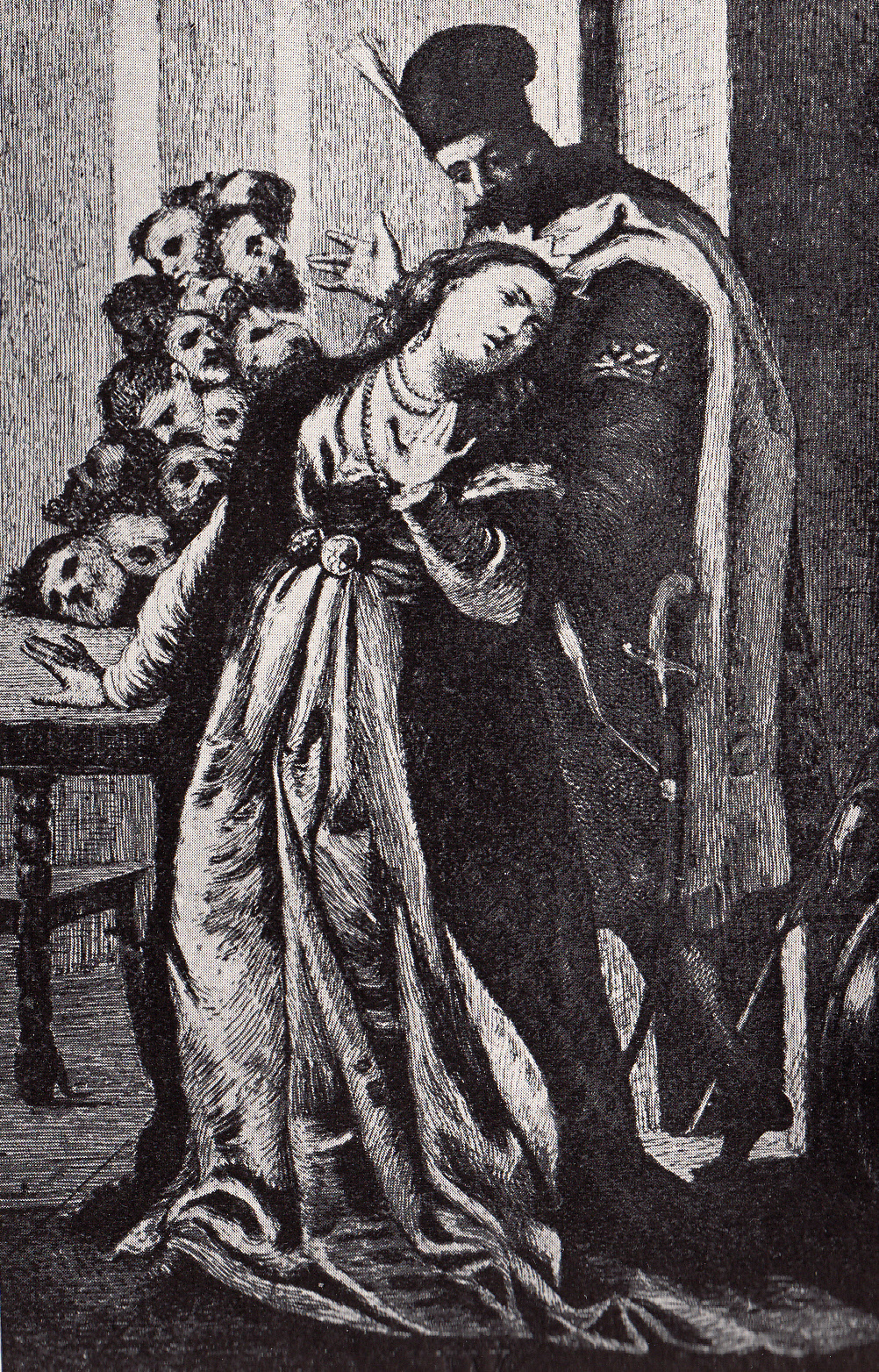
Lăpușneanu and his consort Ruxandra with the severed heads of boyars. 1872 etching by Theodor Aman

Franciscus Pestientis, the pseudonymous Habsburg spy, noted immediately after that Zápolya was directly involved in Despot's assassination, thus securing Eastern Hungary's other border in case of a Habsburg attack from the west. Soldiers sent by Zápolya were present at the final taking of Suceava. This was a major setback for the Habsburg designs in Eastern Europe, and contributed to the reorientation of Ferdinand's foreign policies. According to Denize, Despot's own "Dacian" plan was not fully abandoned by the Moldavians, but resumed in later generations within "more realistic proportions". Historians such as Adolf Armbruster and Cătălin Pungă note that the 1561 discourse holds the first traces of Romanian nationalism. Pungă argues that Despot adopted it for the captatio benevolentiae of his subjects, meaning that the idea of a Moldo–Wallachian political union preceded Despot's reign. As argued by Theodorescu, Despot, as a "cultured adventurer", was one of those figures who "affirmed sonorously the Romanians' Romanness".

Tomșa took the throne, though he never managed to obtain Ottoman recognition; he was also attacked by Peter the Younger, who dreamed of uniting the two thrones, but was able to defeat him. He and Moțoc ultimately fled to Poland, where they were put to death in May 1564. His short regnal interlude confused writers of the period: in a 1564 brief by the Venetian mercenary Giovanandrea Gromo, Despot and Tomșa are merged into a Stefano Eraclio. In late 1563, having obtained Joseph Nasi's support, Lăpușneanu returned to Moldavia to begin his second reign. Allied with the Crimeans, he allowed them to raid Moldavian villages and take some 21,000 peasants as slaves. There then came new heights of terror, specifically aimed at those boyars and Orthodox priests who had supported Despot. One mass execution made 47 boyar and courtier victims. Records show that he also targeted the minority religions, ordering massacres of the Armenians and less documented persecutions of the remaining Protestants. He tolerated Catholics, and, in at least one instance, openly agreed with them that Despot had been a "godless man".

The new monarch reportedly ordered Despot's remains exhumed, placed in a burlap sack, and left to hang from a pole. One record claims that Putna's monks recovered them and placed them in a smaller wooden monastery; two centuries after, Putna was still preserving Despot's empty grave. Lăpușneanu also delivered Demetrios to Chiajna, who ordered his public humiliation and decapitation. In 1565–1566 Łaski activated his rights to the throne, and tried to invade Moldavia with Habsburg help; he had competition from Ștefan Mâzgă, endorsed by Pierre Roussel and Ferenc Zay. While Cyprian Bazylik withdrew from politics, to experience great success as a composer and prose writer, impostors claiming to be Despot's brother or son appeared in Venetian territories or under Habsburg rule. Peter the Younger's rival Mărăcine, who was living in exile in Istanbul, had been executed on Suleiman's orders. Nicolaus Bassaraba followed in Despot's footsteps, escaping to Malta, then to Spain.

The Chronicle of Azarie includes a posthumous damnation of Despot. His death, the author claimed, had "stifled the amber that produced a smoke of non-belief". Traditional Moldavian historiography replicated this narrative, asserting that Despot's downfall was an act of divine retribution. Crăciun notes that the "reactive violence or intensity offer a measure of the impact his [religious] policies have had on Moldavian society". Another author, Cristian Luca, proposes a parallel between Despot and a 1580s Wallachian Prince, Petru Cercel, in that they both tried to Westernize their countries but were met with violent hostility from traditionalists. However, some Moldavians remained indebted to the deceased Prince. According to Kesterska Sergescu, a series of rebellions and mass flights in the later 1560s suggests that "Jacob Heraclide's example did not go unheeded". Historical topographers note the presence of a carved stone slab at Areni, which may indicate that the populace there still commemorated his death.

=== Patronage and aesthetics ===
Despot's lesser arms (reconstruction based on 1555 diploma and coin models)

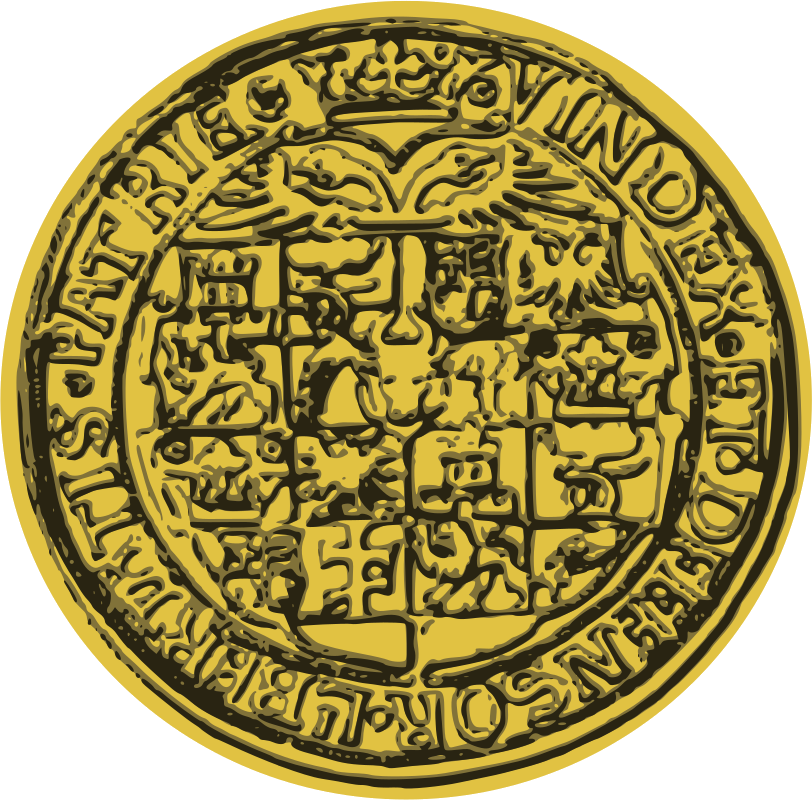
Obverse of the 1563 thaler, featuring greater coat of arms

Arms used by Cyprian Bazylik

Despite Azarie's pronouncements, Johann Sommer survived the persecutions and was still present in Moldavia by 1570, when he joined Ferenc Dávid's Unitarian movement in Transylvania. Cotnari's collegium continued to function as a Calvinist seminary until 1588, when Peter the Lame ceded it to the Catholics. As noted by literary historian D. Murărașu, it had failed in its apparent promise, that of sparking a "cultural renaissance" in Orthodox lands; scholar Traian Diaconescu also argues that, having "planted the seed of Renaissance culture", Despot still "failed to realize that one cannot abruptly 'civilize' a country with only a few educated boyars, and illiterate masses." Despot's influence on the Catholic community of Iași County was sensed in the 1590s by Bernardo Quirini, the church inspector, who found that Catholics had kept the Lutheran books and even agreed with some Protestant doctrines. The new school was eventually moved out of Cotnari, and is today's Saint Joseph Institute.

Despot had a fragmented legacy in visual arts and architecture. He ordered a Calvinist church to be built at Cotnari, but it remained unfinished. After taking Suceava, he ordered the battle of Verbia to be depicted on the (since deteriorated) walls of his princely palace. He also created here a book collection, including precious manuscript copies of the classics, such as a gilded-letter version of Cicero's works, from De re publica to Epistulae ad Atticum. According to several authors, Despot's religious experiment may have also had an enduring impact on Romanian culture: his presumed patronage of some liturgical translations is credited by Papacostea for having given impetus to the emergence of literary Romanian. Scholar N. Drăganu believed that such translations not only existed, but influenced the printer Coresi. This theory was rejected by literary historian Alexandru Rosetti, who notes that Coresi was already active in 1559.

In 1563, Heraclid also had an indirect impact on the landscape and art of Lviv by lending money to his fellow Greek art patron, Konstanty Korniakt. His own rebuilding of Suceava came with an influx of German and Italian master craftsmen, including a goldsmith Wolfgang Midwischer. The state mint put out Despot's own version of the Lăpușneanu gold dinar and Ferdinand's silver Ort, though its main products were bronze and copper pennies inspired by the Ottoman mangır. Theodorescu believes that the portraits on his bullion coins can be attributed to Midwischer. They replicated Western Renaissance portraits, that proved highly influential, changing monetary symbolism for some 30 years.

Scholarly debates cover the interpretation of Despot's coinage, seals, and greater coat of arms. His imperial diploma of 1555 showed a regular party per cross shield with various charges, including a fish-with-ring, a temple, a bay tree, and a lion. In 1560, Despot also began using the Moldavian aurochs, which generally had a classical (affronty, inescutcheon) representation. This symbolism became more complex during his reign, when a 14-quarters heraldic seal appeared, also including the aurochs and the Reichsadler; a charge of roses was also featured. The result is described as a "pretentious heraldic amalgam" by scholar Dan Cernovodeanu, who also notes its similarity with the personal arms of Charles V.

Pippidi identifies the three roses as canting arms of Rhodos, while the fish and "Polycrates' ring" stand for Samos. However, Cernovodeanu argues that Despot took his roses from the Mușatins' dynastic arms, also borrowing a modified fleur-de-lis and Pahonia (which became, respectively, a "leaf-like" pattern and a cross pattée). Other scholars believe that the roses allude to Despot's project of uniting Moldavia and Wallachia, or, contrarily, that they have a purely aesthetic function. A lion also appeared on dinars probably minted by Despot for circulation in an occupied Transylvania. These are largely based on the Hunyadi family arms, including a raven, and also feature a Patriarchal cross. The intent behind such symbolism may be political, or more pragmatically an attempt capitalize on the prestige of dinars from the old Hungarian Kingdom. All such imagery is altered in the final issues of coinage, where Despot uses the aurochs, the Wallachian bird, and the seven towers of Transylvania under a Reichsadler.

=== Folkloric and literary memory ===
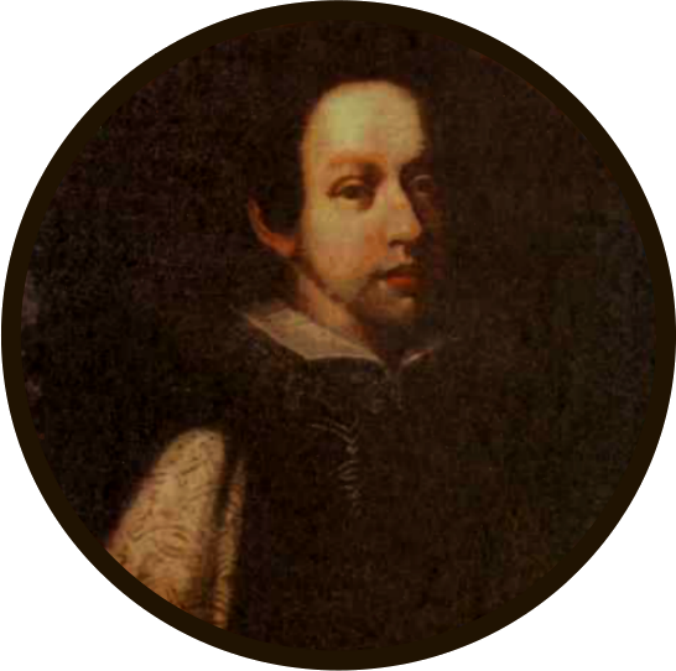
Attributed portrait of Basilicus Melitensis, displayed at Birgu; may actually depict Cosimo II de' Medici

Despot's turbulent rule was the object of interest outside the Danubian Principalities. As Pippidi notes, by 1563 he had a "European notoriety." Sommer's memoirs and Christian Schesaeus' poetry "opened a line of belles-lettres works focusing on the Moldavian prince." In the 18th century, inspired by Leunclavius' essay on Despot, Jean-Baptiste de Recoles composed verse lamenting the killing of "Jacques Héraclide" by his "irresponsible people". Several historical sources associated with the Knights Hospitaller have enshrined the legend of a Basilicus Melitensis, identified as a 15th- or 16th-century ruler "of Wallachia"; in Mifsud Bonnici's biographical dictionary, he appears as Basilio ta' Vallachia. This tradition was also publicized in the 1990s by Maltese authors Charles A. Gauci and Vincent Zammit, who compiled the various textual references and published reproductions of Basilicus' attributed portraits. According to Pippidi, the story itself is a distant retelling of Despot's career in Moldavia, while the portraits are part of the invented tradition: they depict the 17th-century Cosimo II de' Medici and the 18th-century Constantin Brâncoveanu; inscriptions identifying them as "Basilicus" were probably added before 1850. By the 1860s, the complete story of Despot's reign had been popularized in Malta by authors G. Trapani, G. A. Vassallo, and L. Calleja, the latter of whom also drew his portrait.

Despot's project to unite Wallachia and Moldavia was only realized in 1859, with the "United Principalities". Here and in the successor Kingdom of Romania, interest in Heraclid's life was revived by a series of literary works—though, as Gostyński observed in 1945, "generally, Romanian historians' opinion on Despot Vodă [remains] unfavorable." A Despot Vodă is one of six "Romanian history dramas" completed by Dimitrie Bolintineanu in the 1860s. A decade later, Samson Bodnărescu similarly focused on the rule of Lăpușneanu, inexplicably eliminating Despot from his retelling. Vasile Alecsandri was inspired by Bodnărescu to revisit the events with his own work of drama. Also called Despot Vodă, it was first shown at the National Theatre Bucharest in October, 1879. The work was loosely based on the historical narrative, and more heavily indebted to Victor Hugo, turning Despot himself into a romantic hero. It divided the public between those who, like Mihai Eminescu and Ion Ghica, saw in it Alecsandri's masterpiece, and dissatisfied critics, such as Barbu Ștefănescu Delavrancea. Iorga also viewed its take on Heraclid as "exaggerated and false" for failing to capture the "sincere dreamer". Literary historian Sebastian-Vlad Popa notes that, by the 1990s, the work was viewed as "detestable" in the theatrical community, and ridiculed as a "wooden text".

Also in the 1870s, Nicolae Scurtescu contributed a dramatic poem with the same subject and title. According to Iorga and Murărașu, it is just as valuable as Alecsandri's text. Popa notes a contrast, in that Scurtescu's writing is "naturalistic", its violence seeping into "absurdity". Theodor Codrescu's play Plăeșul Logofăt Mare, dating from the same stage in literary development, was also set in Heraclid's Moldavia. Translated into Italian as Amore e Giustizia, it was performed in 1897 at Naples. Despot is also the hero of 1920s short stories by Eug. Boureanu, and of two historical novels: Constantin Gane's Farmece (1933) and Romulus Seișanu's Aventuroasa viață a lui Despot-Vodă (1938). In the late 1930s, a successful effort was made to collect and publish all of Despot's own manuscripts on military matters, grouping copies from the national libraries of Poland and Austria, and from the Prussian Archives; another manuscript tract, signed by Christoporski, was discovered by Olteanu at Kórnik in the 1960s. In 1978, Eusebiu Ștefănescu appeared as a cunning and hypocritical Despot in Malvina Urșianu's historical drama, Întoarcerea lui Vodă Lăpușneanu—his debut film role.

== Notes ==
Regnal titles
Preceded by Alexandru Lăpușneanu	Prince (King) of Moldavia; 1561–1563	Succeeded by Ștefan Tomșa
