= Cotnari =

- Commune
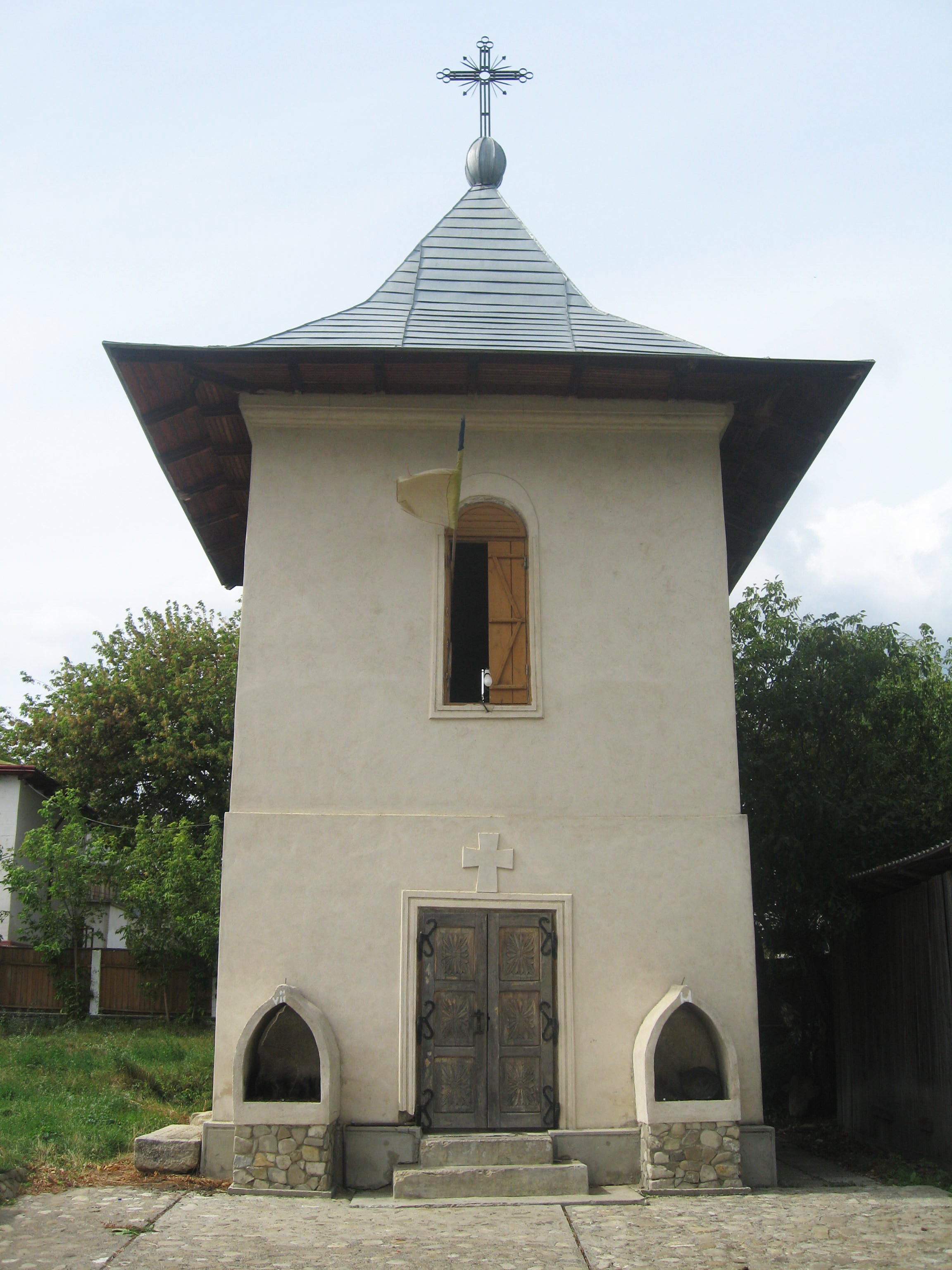
- Saint Paraskeva Church in Cotnari

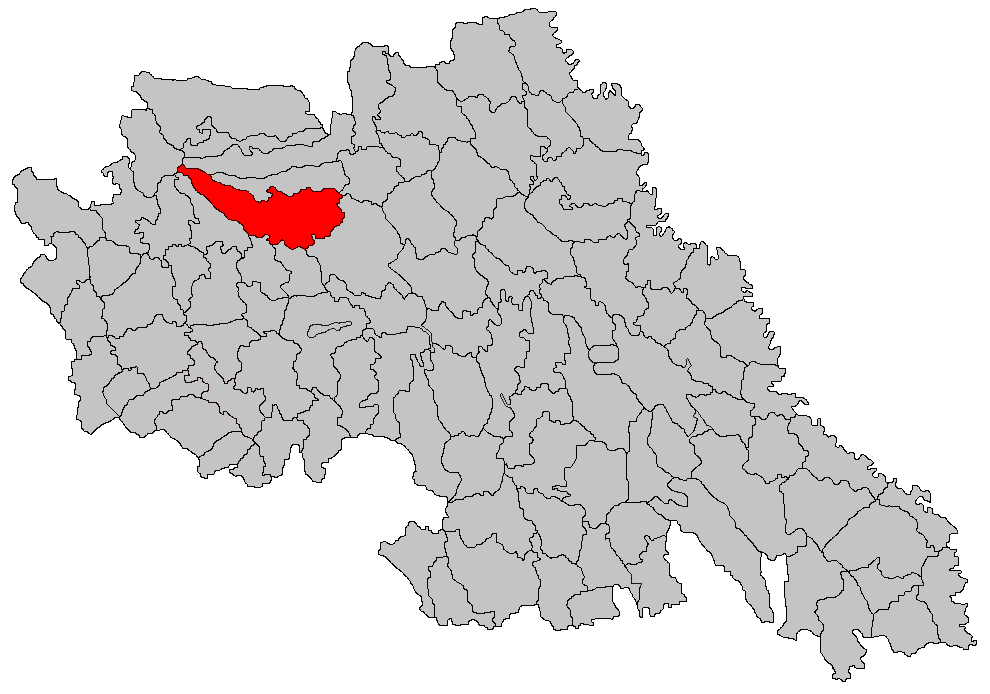
- Location in Iași County

- Location in Romania
- Coordinates: 47°20′25″N 26°56′27″E
- Country: Romania
- County: Iași

Government
  - Mayor (2020–2024): Vasile Crețu (PSD)
- Area: 103.53 km^{2} (39.97 sq mi)
- Elevation: 145 m (476 ft)
- Population (2021-12-01): 5,843
  - Density: 56.44/km^{2} (146.2/sq mi)
- Time zone: UTC+02:00 (EET)
  - Summer (DST): UTC+03:00 (EEST)
- Postal code: 707120
- Area code: (+40) 0232
- Vehicle reg.: IS
- Website: primariacotnari.ro

Cotnari (Romanian pronunciation: [kotˈnarʲ]; German: Kotnersberg, Kottnersberg or Kotnar) is a village and the center of the eponymous commune in Iași County, Romania, in the historical region of Western Moldavia. It is located north-west of Iași and south of Hârlău, in a major wine-producing region of Romania, and is famous for the wine variety known as Grasă de Cotnari. Cârjoaia, the forest of Dumbrava Roșie, and other sites in Cotnari are regional tourist spots.

The commune is composed of eleven villages: Bahluiu, Cârjoaia, Cireșeni, Cotnari, Făgăt, Hodora, Horodiștea, Iosupeni, Lupăria, Valea Racului, and Zbereni.

== History ==
Proof of habitation in the area goes back to the Cucuteni culture; a fortress dating from the 6th or 5th century BC was discovered on the nearby Cătălina Hill (nowadays a nature reserve).

First attested in 1448, Cotnari was the site of a strong Roman Catholic community composed mainly of Germans and Hungarians. The establishment of vineyards is attributed by local tradition to an initiative of Moldavian Prince Stephen the Great, under whose rule the village rose to the status of alternate residence, while stone structures and roads to serve the wine trade were built in the area.

Its Catholic tradition made the village a target for Reformation in the 1560s, under the rule of the Protestant Prince Ioan Iacob Heraclid: Heraclid built a Latin Renaissance academy (Schola Latina), placed under the leadership of Ioannes Sommerus; the church he built on the site was re-established as a Catholic place of worship after Heraclid's death, and served the community until 1873, when it burned down. In 1641, Cotnari became the regional center of Catholic education, until it was replaced 60 years later by the Jesuit school in Iași.

== Climate ==
Cotnari has a temperate continental climate, classified as Dfb under the Köppen climate classification. Historically, based on data collected between 1961 and 1980, the region was characterized by a relatively cool climate, with average annual temperatures hovering between 8.5 °C and 10.0 °C. Winters were severe, with extreme temperatures occasionally dropping to -30 °C. This high risk of frost traditionally forced viticulturists to use a specialized vine training system where the vine stocks were covered with soil for winter insulation.

Despite cold winters, the region benefits from strong microclimatic advantages during its 190-day growing season (April 1 to September 30). The sunny slopes receive up to 93 kcal/cm^{2} of global solar radiation, and July temperatures average a warm 19.0°C to 21.1°C. This combination provides the necessary heat for grape ripening, though the area remains vulnerable to early autumn frosts and noticeably cool nights in September.

Climate data for Cotnari (2014–2026 normals, extremes 1930–present)
| Month | Jan | Feb | Mar | Apr | May | Jun | Jul | Aug | Sep | Oct | Nov | Dec | Year |
|---|---|---|---|---|---|---|---|---|---|---|---|---|---|
| Record high °C (°F) | 18.8 (65.8) | 21.0 (69.8) | 27.3 (81.1) | 29.5 (85.1) | 34.7 (94.5) | 36.1 (97.0) | 38.2 (100.8) | 38.8 (101.8) | 36.1 (97.0) | 31.0 (87.8) | 23.6 (74.5) | 19.8 (67.6) | 38.8 (101.8) |
| Mean daily maximum °C (°F) | 2.9 (37.2) | 4.8 (40.6) | 10.2 (50.4) | 15.8 (60.4) | 20.7 (69.3) | 25.7 (78.3) | 27.8 (82.0) | 28.1 (82.6) | 22.9 (73.2) | 15.5 (59.9) | 8.2 (46.8) | 4.8 (40.6) | 15.6 (60.1) |
| Daily mean °C (°F) | 0.0 (32.0) | 1.7 (35.1) | 6.3 (43.3) | 11.3 (52.3) | 16.1 (61.0) | 21.1 (70.0) | 23.0 (73.4) | 23.1 (73.6) | 18.3 (64.9) | 11.7 (53.1) | 5.5 (41.9) | 2.2 (36.0) | 11.7 (53.1) |
| Mean daily minimum °C (°F) | −2.8 (27.0) | −1.3 (29.7) | 2.4 (36.3) | 6.7 (44.1) | 11.6 (52.9) | 16.5 (61.7) | 18.1 (64.6) | 18.1 (64.6) | 13.8 (56.8) | 7.8 (46.0) | 2.9 (37.2) | −0.4 (31.3) | 7.8 (46.0) |
| Record low °C (°F) | −29.0 (−20.2) | −29.0 (−20.2) | −17.2 (1.0) | −8.6 (16.5) | −2.5 (27.5) | 3.0 (37.4) | 8.2 (46.8) | 7.2 (45.0) | 0.0 (32.0) | −7.5 (18.5) | −19.2 (−2.6) | −22.1 (−7.8) | −29.0 (−20.2) |
| Average precipitation mm (inches) | 22.1 (0.87) | 25.4 (1.00) | 33.2 (1.31) | 42.9 (1.69) | 62.0 (2.44) | 85.1 (3.35) | 67.7 (2.67) | 40.9 (1.61) | 53.6 (2.11) | 55.6 (2.19) | 34.6 (1.36) | 30.4 (1.20) | 553.5 (21.8) |
| Average precipitation days (≥ 1.0 mm) | 5.4 | 5.0 | 5.8 | 6.5 | 8.2 | 7.9 | 7.9 | 5.2 | 5.7 | 5.9 | 5.7 | 5.7 | 74.9 |
| Average snowy days | 11.3 | 6.9 | 3.9 | 1.9 | 0 | 0 | 0 | 0 | 0 | 0 | 3.6 | 7.8 | 35.4 |
Source: Meteomanz (2014-2026); Infoclimat (1980-2010); ANM

== Natives ==
- Victor Iamandi (1891–1940), politician who served as the Romanian Minister of Justice in 1938–1939
- Cătălin Moroșanu (born 1984), kickboxer, chanbara practitioner, and rugby player
- Cezar Petrescu (1892–1961), journalist, novelist, and children's writer
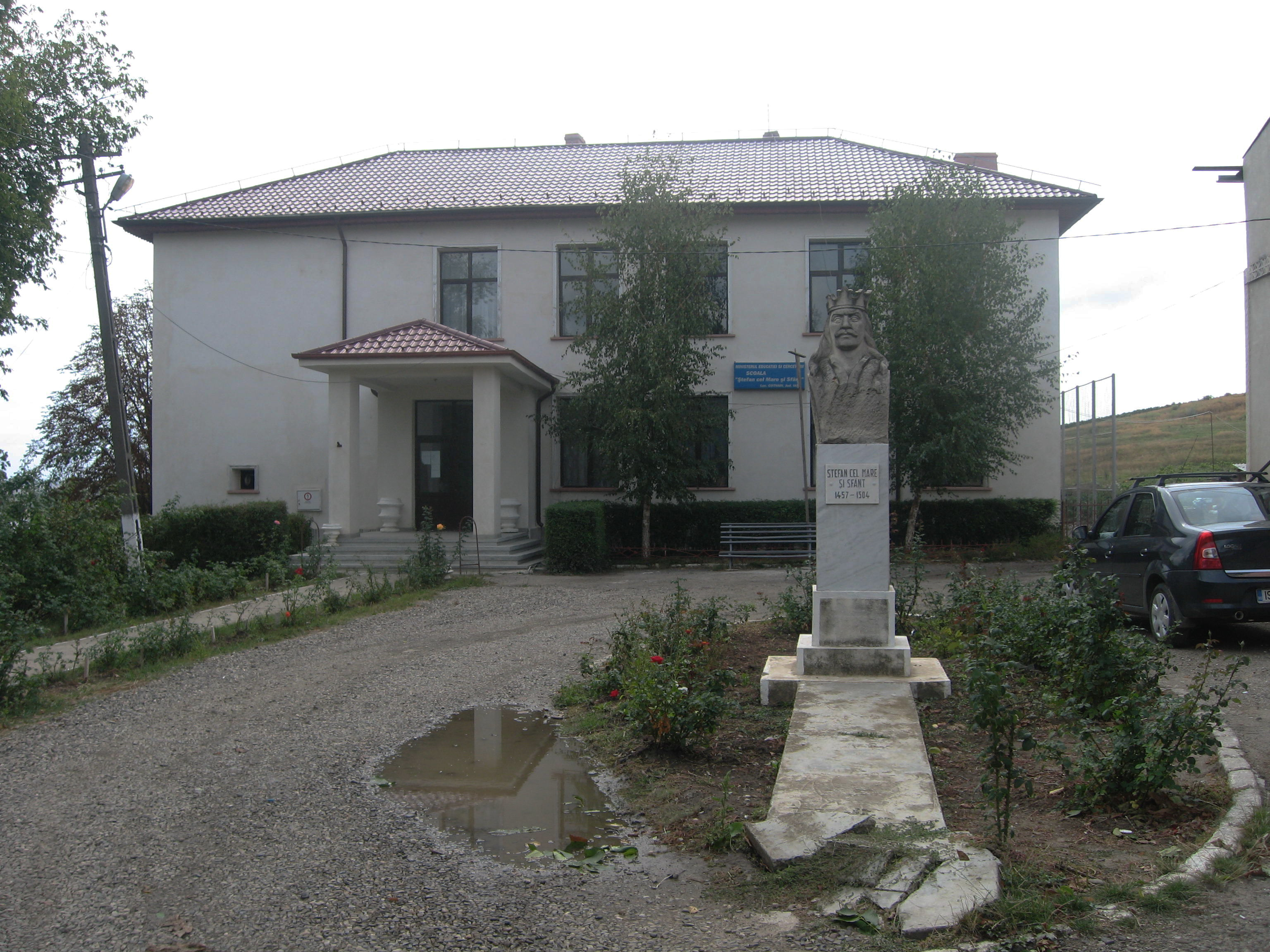
The Cotnari schoolhouse

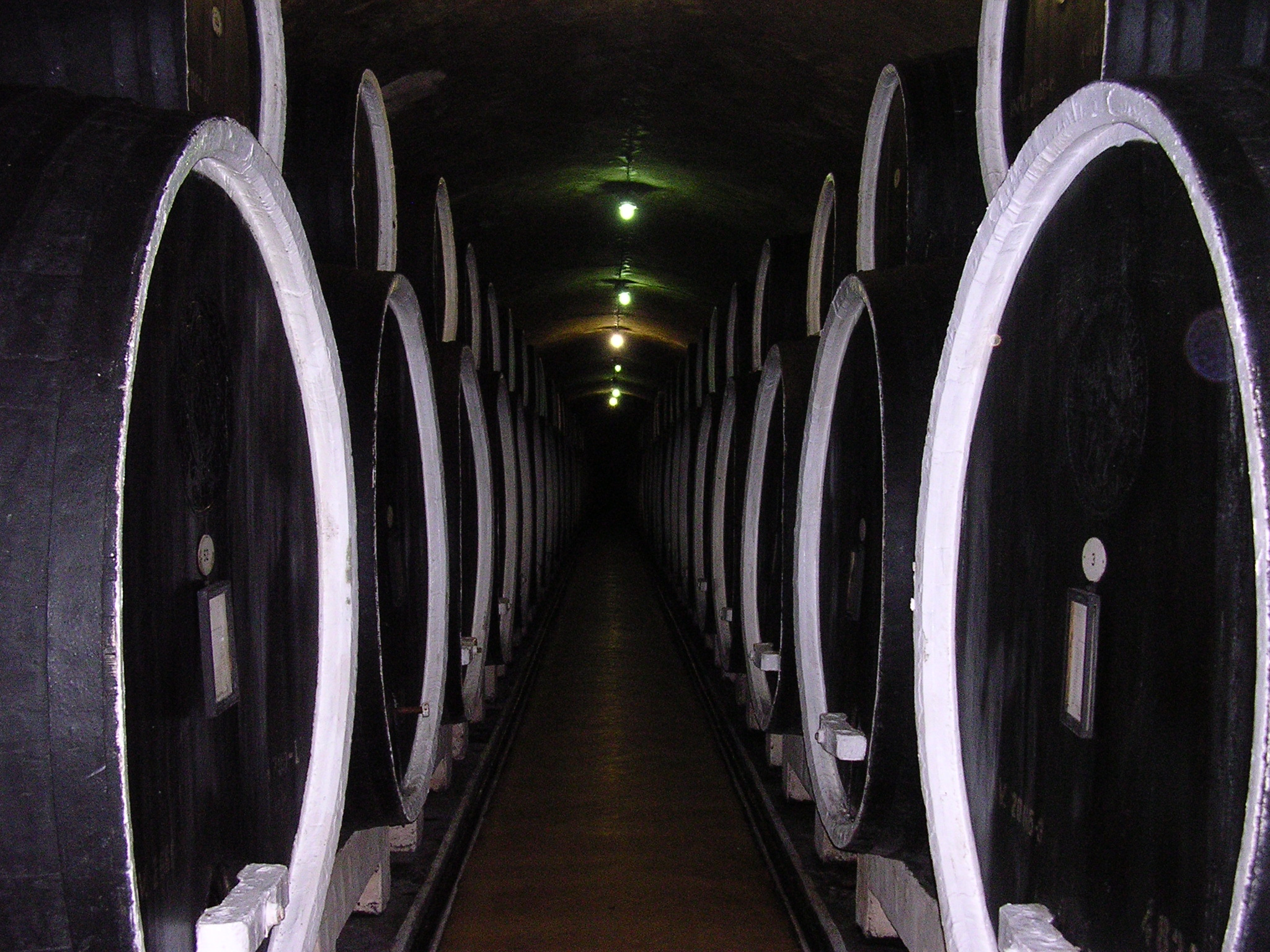
Wine cellar in Cotnari

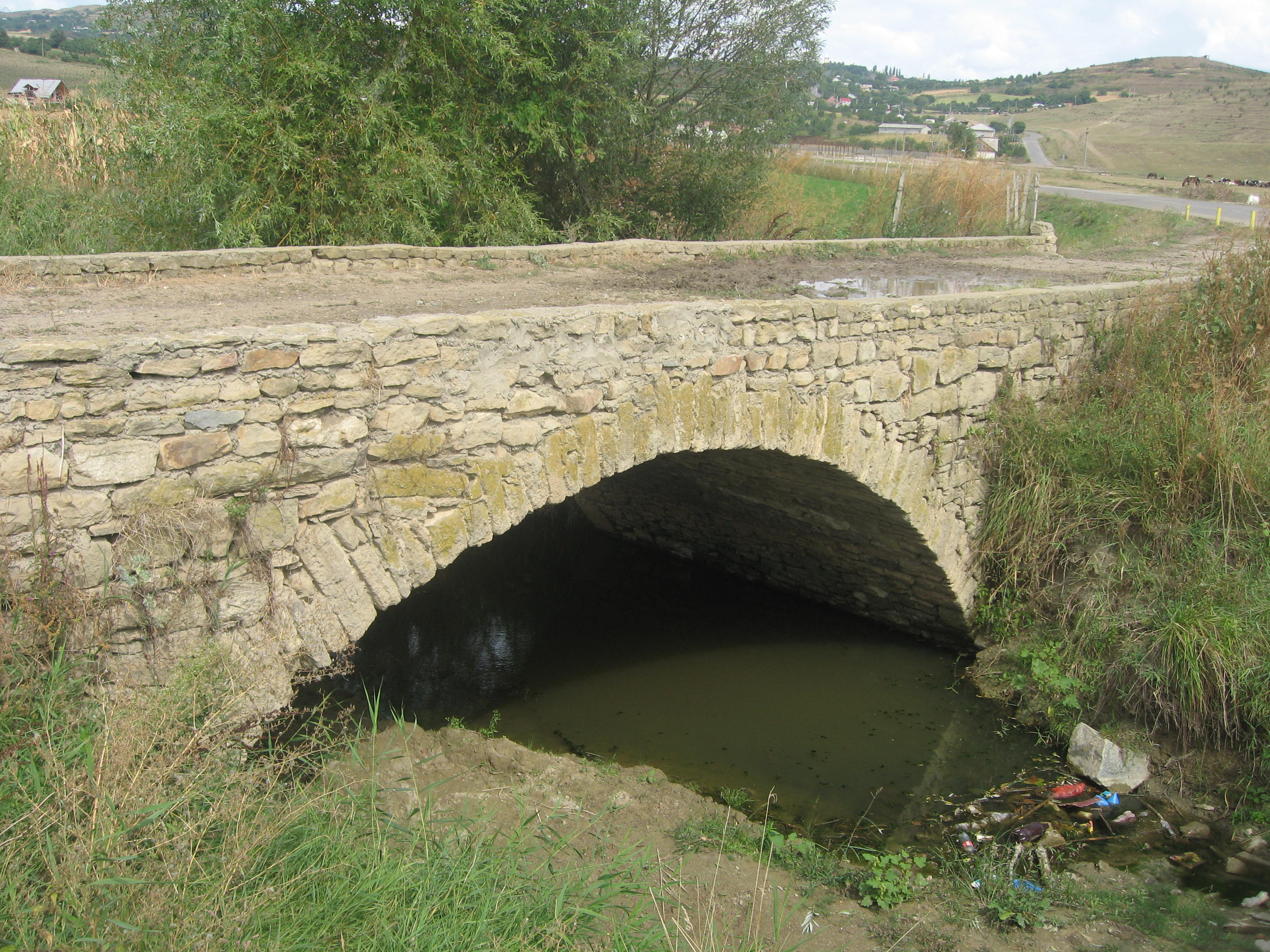
Medieval stone bridge in Cârjoaia
