= Șipoteni =

Șipoteni Spărieți (vechi)
- Village
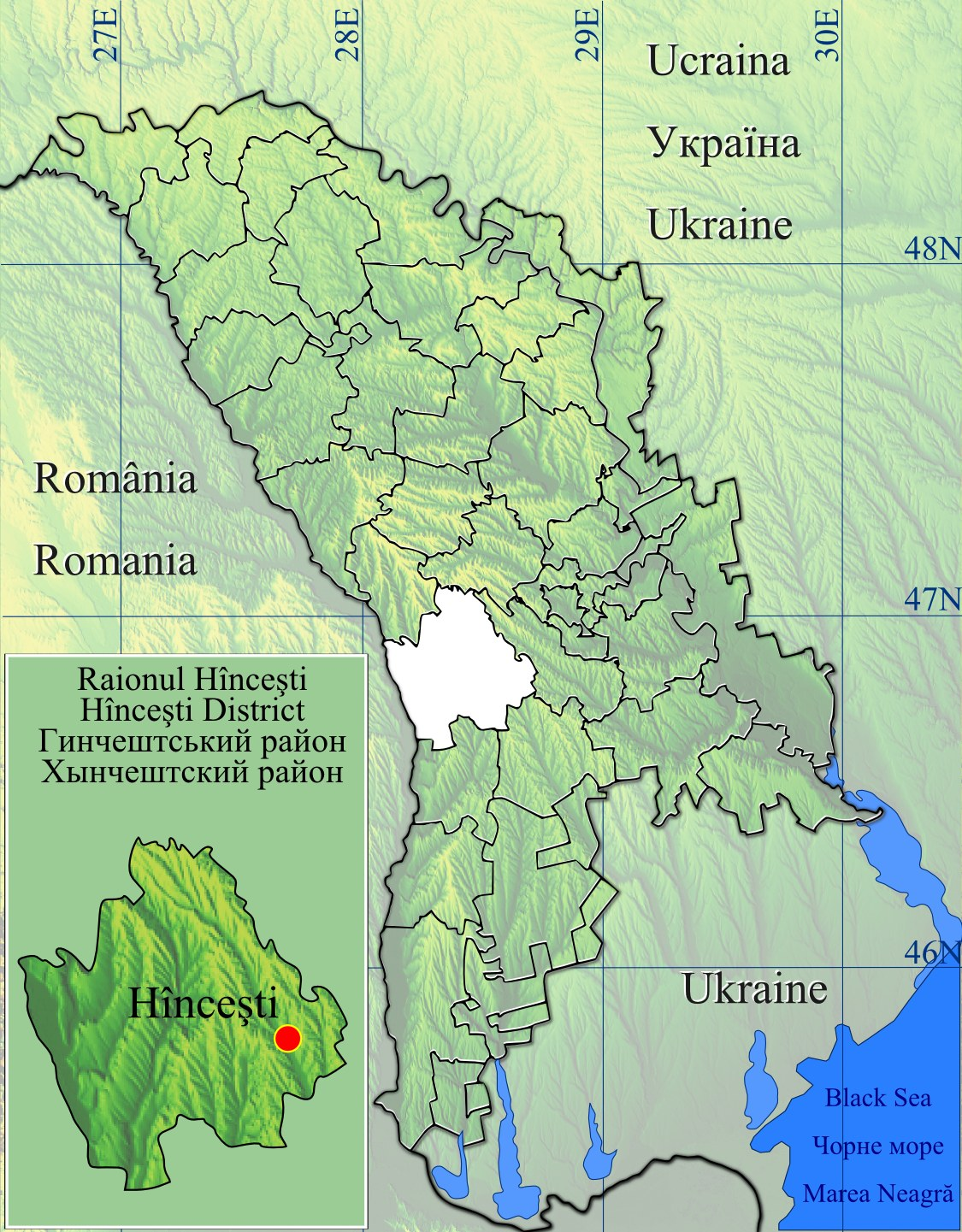
- Location within Hîncești
- Coordinates: 46°56′32″N 28°27′15″E
- Country: Moldova
- District: Hîncești District

Government
  - Mayor: Nicolae Moroz (PLDM)

Population (2014 census)
  - Total: 789
- Time zone: UTC+2 (EET)
  - Summer (DST): UTC+3 (EEST)
- Postal code: MD-3451

Șipoteni is a village in Hîncești District, Moldova.
