= Johann Sommer =

Johann Sommer (Latin: Ioannes Sommerus; 1542–1574) was a Transylvanian Saxon Protestant theologian, poet and Despot Vodă's biographer.

Sommer was born in Pirna. In 1562 he enrolled at University of Frankfurt, but did not graduate. Born in Pirna, Sommerus came to Moldavia as secretary to the reforming prince Jacob Heraclides (Despot Vodă), becoming the main figure in the short-lived College of Cotnari (Schola Latina) (1562–1563). After the Prince's death in 1563, Sommer and his other supporters had to flee. Sommer moved to Transylvania and led a similar school in Braşov (the one founded by Johannes Honter, the Honterus-Gymnasium in Kronstadt), from 1565 to 1567. While he was rector there he wrote the epic Reges Hungarici.

He moved on to the John Sigismund Unitarian Academy, Kolosvar (1570–1574). According to the 18th-century historian Johann Seivert, he married the daughter of Ferenc Dávid, and this statement was overtaken by many other sources; however, there are no direct proofs of this, and it is in contradiction with more proven facts. He died in Cluj.

== Works ==
- Arbor Illustristissimae Heraclidarum familiae, quae ad Dasorina Basilica ac Despotica vocatur, justificata, comprobata, monumentisque et insignibus abaucta ab invictissimo Carolo V. Rom. Imp. et ab Imperiali consistorio. Anno 1555. (Brassó).
- Elegia in Nvptias Clarissimi Viri D. Petri Bogneri Coron: LL. Doctoris, & pudicissimae virginis Annae filiae D. Ioachimi Koch, Consulis Mediensis Quarum solennitas erit die 20. Februarij Anno 1569... Albae-Ivliae.
- Oratio Funebris, In mortem Illustrissimi Et Regiis Virtutibus Ornatissimi, vera etiam pietate excellentis Principis ac Domini D. Ioannis Secundi Electi Regis Hungariae & C. Qui natus est Anno Domini 1540. Diem vero suum sancte obijt 1571. Mart. 14. ... Clandiogoli 1571.
- Reges Hungarici. Et Clades Moldavica: Cujus Etiam Hortulus Amoris Cum Colica in formam Dramatis scripta, ad finem adjectus est. Omnia studio & opera Stephani Helneri, Senatoris Bistricensis, in Transylvania, collecta & in lucem edita. Witebergae, M.D.LXXX. (Költemények. 1573-ból. Újra lenyomtatva. Paraeus, Joh. Phil., Deliciae Poetarum Hungaricorum Francofurti, 1619. 355–404. 1.)
- Refutatio scripti Petri Carolini, editi Witebergae, Scripta a Joh. Sommero ... Ingolstadi, 1582.
- Tractatus aliquot Christianae Religionis ... U. ott, 1582.
- Vita Jacobi despotae Moldavorum Reguli ... edita sumptibus Ill. & Gen. Dn. Emerici Forgách ... Adjectae sunt ejusdem autoris de Clade Moldavica, Elegia XV. quibus etiam historia Despotica continetur. Una cum explicatione quorundam locorum in hoc Sommero Scripto, & Commentatiuncula brevis de Walachia & rebus Walachicis Petri Albini... U. ott, 1587.

== Bibliography ==
- Cziráki, Zsuzsanna (2006). Az erdélyi szászok története. Erdélyi szász irodalomtörténet (in Hungarian). Kozármisleny: Imedias Kiadó. ISBN 963-87195-0-8.
- Szinnyei, József (2000), Magyar írók élete és munkái [Life and Works of Hungarian Writers] (in Hungarian), Budapest: Arcanum, ISBN 978-9638602992
- (in Romanian) Gh. Al. Cazan, Istoria filosofiei românești, EDP, 1984, p 29-31
