= Nicolae Costin (chronicler) =

Moldavian chronicler (1660–1712)

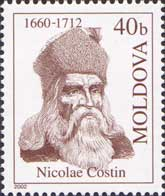
- Born: 1660
- Died: 1712 (aged 51–52)

Nicolae Costin (1660–1712), son of Miron Costin, was a Moldavian chronicler.

== Works ==
Nicolae Costin was the author of several historical writings dealing with the Principality of Moldova:

- Ceasornicul domnilor
- Cartea descălecatului de-ntâiu
- Letopiseţul Ţării Moldovei de la zidirea lumii până la 1601
- Cronica domniei lui Nicolae Mavrocordat (1709-1711)
- Opere (Ed. Junimea, Iaşi, 1976)
- Letopiseţul Ţării Moldovei de la zidirea lumii pînă la 1601 şi de la 1709 la 1711 (Ed. Junimea, Iaşi, 1976)
- Scrieri (Ed. Hyperion, Chişinău, 1990)
