= Sipoteni =

- Commune
- Location within Moldova
- Coordinates: 47.2763888889°N 28.1983333333°E
- Country: Moldova
- District: Călărași District

Government
  - Mayor: Vasile Rață (AMN)

Population (2014)
  - Total: 6,845
- Time zone: UTC+2 (EET)
  - Summer (DST): UTC+3 (EEST)

Sipoteni commune (until 1996 Șipoteni) is a commune in Călărași district, Republic of Moldova. It consists of the villages of Sipoteni (residence village), Tochile (suburb) and Podul Lung.

Sipoteni commune is one of the largest in Moldova. There are about 25 commercial units, a bakery, a mill, a sugar mill, a poultry factory, an apple juice factory, a wine factory, a wood processing factory, an oil filling station, a gas filling station and a large number of farmers who cultivate the agricultural lands on the commune's territory.

== Demographics ==
According to the 2014 census data, the commune has a population of 6,845 inhabitants. At the 2004 census there were 7,383 inhabitants.

== Administration and politics ==
The composition of the Sipoteni Local Council (15 councilors), elected on November 5, 2023, is as follows:

Partid	Consilieri	Componență
Partidul Acțiune și Solidaritate	11	Componență
Partidul Socialiștilor din Republica Moldova	3	Componență
Partidul Liberal Democrat din Moldova	1	Componență
