= Moțoc =

Moțoc is a Romanian surname. Notable people with the surname include:

- Adrian Moțoc (born 1996), Romanian rugby player
- Ion Moțoc (died 1564), Grand Treasurer for several Moldavian rulers
- Mircea D. Moțoc (1916–2006) Romanian agromomist, soil scientist, professor
- Varlaam Moțoc, Metropolitan of Moldavia (during 1632–1653)

== See also ==
- Motoc (disambiguation)
