= 1756 in Sweden =

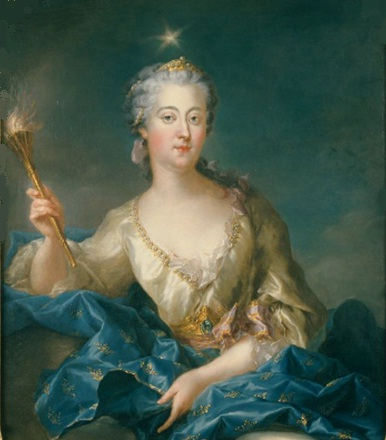
Luise Ulrike by Latinville

Events from the year 1756 in Sweden

== Incumbents ==
- Monarch – Adolf Frederick

== Events ==
- February - A conflict between the Riksdag and the King and the Queen result in the removal of the current governor of Crown Prince Gustav, who is replaced by a new one, appointed by the parliament.
- 26 May - The parliament begun to use a name stamp with the signature of the King, when the monarch refuses to sign papers of state.
- July - The Coup of 1756 of Queen Louisa Ulrika, in which she planned to replace the reinstate the absolute monarchy by the support of the Hovpartiet, is exposed.
- 23 July - Eight participants in the Queen's planned Coup d'état is executed in Stockholm.
- - The common Moonshine manufacturing of brännvin is banned.
- - Ban on the import of coffee.
- - Sweden and Denmark conduct an alliance at sea to protect the ships at the North Sea.
- - The Awakening movement starts in the province of Finland, inspired by Lisa Eriksdotter.
- - En swensks tankar öfwer den 22 junii 1756. Sthlm 1756. by Elisabeth Stierncrona

== Births ==
- 3 April – Carl Gustaf af Leopold, poet (died 1829)
- 23 April – Maria Elisabet de Broen, translator and theatre manager (died 1809)
- 20 June - Joseph Martin Kraus, composer (died 1792)
- July 7- Gustaf Adolf Reuterholm, politician and royal favorite (died 1813)
- 15 August – Olof Åhlström, composer (died 1835)
- 9 September – Christopher Christian Karsten, opera singer (died 1827)
- Date unknown - Brita Hagberg, war heroine (died 1825)
- Date unknown - Maria Katarina Öhrn, singer and actress (died 1783)
- Date unknown - Henrik Gustaf Ulfvenklou, mystic and medium (died 1819)
- Maria Nilsdotter i Ölmeskog, farmer and heroine (died 1822)

== Deaths ==
- 24 June - Olof Celsius, botanist, philologist and clergyman
- 23 July - Johan Puke, participator in the Coup of 1756
- 23 July - Magnus Stålsvärd, participator in the Coup of 1756
- 23 July - Gustaf Jacob Horn, participator in the Coup of 1756
- 23 July - Erik Brahe, participator in the Coup of 1756
- Nils Reuterholm, Governor and statesman.
