= Vomit (disambiguation) =

To vomit is to eject the contents of the stomach (or other chamber). It also refers to the contents ejected.

Vomit may also refer to:

- Emesis
- Fake vomit, a novelty item designed to look like mucus or vomit
- "Vomit", a song by Girls from the 2011 album Father, Son, Holy Ghost
- Vicki Vomit (born 1963), German musician and comedian
- "Vomit", a season 2 episode of Two Pints of Lager and a Packet of Crisps

== See also ==
- Vomitoria (disambiguation)
- Vomitorium
- Vomitory (disambiguation)
- Barf (disambiguation)
- Puke (disambiguation)
