= Posthumous birth =

Birth after the death of a parent

A posthumous birth is the birth of a child after the death of a parent. A person born in these circumstances is called a posthumous child or a posthumously born person. Most instances of posthumous birth involve the birth of a child after the death of their father, but the term is also applied to infants delivered shortly after the death of the mother, usually by caesarean section.

== Legal implications ==
Posthumous birth has special implications in law, potentially affecting the child's citizenship and legal rights, inheritance, and order of succession. Legal systems generally include special provisions regarding inheritance by posthumous children and the legal status of such children. For example, Massachusetts law states that a posthumous child is treated as having been living at the death of the parent, meaning that the child receives the same share of the parent's estate as if the child had been born before the parent's death. Most states recognize a posthumous child born within a set time frame, normally 280 to 300 days after the death of the decedent father.

Another emerging legal issue in the United States is the control of genetic material after the death of the donor. United States law holds that posthumous children of U.S. citizens who are born outside the United States have the same rights to citizenship that they would have had if the deceased U.S. citizen parent had been alive at the time of their birth. In the field of assisted reproduction, snowflake children, i.e. those "adopted" as frozen embryos by people unrelated to them, can result in the birth of a child after the death of one or both of their genetic parents.

=== In monarchies and nobilities ===
A posthumous birth has special significance in the case of hereditary monarchies and hereditary noble titles following primogeniture. In this system, a monarch's or peer's own child precedes that monarch's or peer's sibling in the order of succession. In cases where the widow of a childless king or nobleman is pregnant at the time of his death, the next-in-line is not permitted to assume the throne or title, but must yield place to the unborn child, or ascends and reigns (in the case of a monarch) or succeeds (in the case of a peer) until the child is born (see Alfonso XIII, Charles Edward, Duke of Saxe-Coburg-Gotha or John Pelham, 9th Earl of Chichester).

In monarchies and noble titles that follow male-preference cognatic primogeniture, the situation is similar where the dead monarch or peer was not childless but left a daughter as the next-in-line, as well as a pregnant widow. A posthumous brother would supplant that daughter in the succession, whereas a posthumous sister, being younger, would not. Similarly, in monarchies and noble titles that follow agnatic primogeniture, the sex of the unborn child determines the succession; a posthumous male child would himself succeed, whereas the next-in-line would succeed upon the birth of a posthumous female child.

=== Modern complications ===
Posthumous conception by artificial insemination or in vitro fertilization, whether done using sperm or ova stored before a parent's death or sperm retrieved from a man's corpse, has created new legal issues. When a woman is inseminated with her deceased husband's sperm, laws that establish that a sperm donor is not the legal father of the child born as a result of artificial insemination have had the effect of excluding the deceased husband from fatherhood and making the child legally fatherless.

In the United Kingdom before 2000, birth records of children conceived using a dead man's sperm had to identify the infants as fatherless, but in 2000 the government announced that the law would be changed to allow the deceased father's name to be listed on the birth certificate. In 1986, a New South Wales legal reform commission recommended that the law should recognize the deceased husband as the father of a child born from post-mortem artificial insemination, provided that the woman is his widow and unmarried at the time of birth, but the child should have inheritance rights to the father's estate only if the father left a will that included specific provisions for the child.

In 2001, the Massachusetts Supreme Judicial Court was asked to consider whether the father's name should appear on the birth record for a child conceived through artificial insemination after her father's death, as well as whether that child was eligible for U.S. Social Security benefits. The court ruled in January 2002 that a child could be the legal heir of a dead parent if there was a genetic relationship and the deceased parent had both agreed to the posthumous conception and committed to support the child. Different U.S. state courts and federal appellate courts have ruled differently in similar cases. In 2012, the U.S. Supreme Court ruled in Astrue v. Capato that twins born 18 months after their father's death using the father's frozen sperm were not eligible for Social Security benefits, which set a new precedent.

== Naming ==
In the Middle Ages, it was traditional for posthumous children born in England to be given a matronymic surname instead of a patronymic one. This may in part explain why matronyms are more common in England than in other parts of Europe.

In Ancient Rome, posthumous children of noble birth were often given the cognomen (or third name) 'Postumus'. One example is Agrippa Postumus.

In Yoruba culture, posthumous children are given names that refer to the circumstances concerning the birth. Examples of this include Bàbárímisá, meaning that the Father saw (the child) and ran; Yeyérínsá, meaning that the mother saw (the child) and ran; Ikúdáyísí (or any name with the root dáyísí), which means that death spared the child; and Ẹnúyàmí, meaning that "I was surprised", referring to the fact that the tragic death of the father, mother, or both was sudden and surprising for the family.

== Notable people born posthumously ==
=== Antiquity ===
Name	Born	Late parent	Parent died	Gap	Cause of parent's death
Bindusara; Mauryan Emperor	320 BCE	Durdhara; Mauryan Empress	320 BCE	Same day	Poisoning. He was delivered through caesarean section.
Alexander IV; King of Macedon	August 323 BCE	Alexander the Great; King of Macedon	11 June 323 BCE	2 months	Disease.
Cornelia Postuma	77 BCE	Lucius Cornelius Sulla Felix; Roman dictator	78 BCE		Disease, possibly related to chronic alcoholic abuse.
Agrippa Postumus; Grandson of Augustus Caesar	12 BCE	Marcus Vipsanius Agrippa; Roman general and statesman	12 BCE	A few weeks	Disease.
Rabbi Abaye	c. 280 AD		c. 280 AD		
Shapur II; Sasanian Emperor	309 AD	Hormizd II; Sasanian Emperor	309 AD	40 days	Assassination. Shapur is said to be the only monarch in history who was crowned in utero.
Flavia Maxima Constantia; Roman Empress	1 January 362	Constantius II; Roman Emperor	3 November 361	1 month, 29 days	Fever.

=== Middle Ages ===
Name	Born	Late parent	Parent died	Gap	Cause of parent's death
Muhammad; Prophet of Islam	570	Abdullah ibn Abdul-Muttalib; Arab trader	569	<6 months	Disease while returning from a trade mission in Medina.
Umm Kulthum bint Abi Bakr; Early Muslim scholar	634	Abu Bakr al-Siddiq; Caliph	23 August 634	<3 months	On 23 August 634, Abu Bakr fell sick and did not recover. He developed a high fever and was confined to bed. His illness was prolonged, and when his condition worsened, he died in Medina.
Constantine; Byzantine prince	1 January 798	Constantine VI; Byzantine Emperor	19 April 797	8 months, 13 days	Died of wounds after being blinded by his mother, Irene, who proclaimed herself Empress.
Robert I King of France	15 August 866	Robert the Strong; Count of Anjou	2 July 866	1 month, 13 days	Killed at the Battle of Brissarthe.
Charles the Simple; King of France	17 September 879	Louis the Stammerer; King of France	10 April 879	5 months, 7 days	Disease contracted during a campaign against the Vikings.
Al-Mustakfi; Abbasid caliph	11 November 908	al-Muktafi; Abbasid caliph	13 August 908	3 months, 2 days	Unspecified illness.
Ulf	1067	Harold Godwinson King of England	14 October 1066		Killed in the Battle of Hastings
Haakon Toresfostre	1069	Magnus II of Norway King of Norway	28 April 1069		
Lothair III; Holy Roman Emperor	1075	Gebhard of Supplinburg; Saxon count	9 June 1075		Killed at the Battle of Langensalza.
Henry II; Margrave of Meissen	1103	Henry I, Margrave of the Saxon Ostmark	1103		Killed in battle near the Neisse River.
Saint Drogo; Flemish saint	14 March 1105		His father		His mother died in childbirth, leaving him orphan from birth
Valdemar I King of Denmark	14 January 1131	Canute Lavard; Duke of Schleswig	7 January 1131	7 days	Murdered by Magnus the Strong.
Raymond II of Turenne; Viscount of Turenne	1143	Boson II of Turenne; Viscount of Turenne	1143	4 months	
Constance I Queen of Sicily	2 November 1154	Roger II; King of Sicily and Africa	26 February 1154	8 months, 5 days	
Baldwin V King of Jerusalem	August 1177	William of Montferrat; Count of Jaffa and Ascalon	June 1177	2 months	Possibly malaria.
Arthur I Duke of Brittany	29 March 1187	Geoffrey II; Duke of Brittany	19 August 1186	7 months, 10 days	Disputed. One source claims he was trampled to death in a joust, other that he died of a sudden chest affliction.
Maria of Montferrat; Queen of Jerusalem	Summer 1192	Conrad of Montferrat; King of Jerusalem	28 April 1192	A few months	Assassination.
Theobald I King of Navarre	30 May 1201	Theobald III; Count of Champagne	24 May 1201	6 days	
Raymond Nonnatus; Catholic saint	1204	His mother	1204	Same day	Childbirth. He was retrieved through caesarean section afterward.
Haakon IV; King of Norway	March/April 1204	Haakon III; King of Norway	1 January 1204	2-3 month	Illness after a bloodletting, suspicion of poisoning by Margaret of Sweden, Queen of Norway
Walter IV; Count of Brienne	1205	Walter III; Count of Brienne	14 June 1205		Killed in battle.
Erik Eriksson; King of Sweden	1216	Erik Knutsson; King of Sweden	10 April 1216		Natural causes, said to be a fever.
Charles I King of Sicily	early 1227	Louis VIII; King of France	8 November 1226	??	Dysentery.
Gertrude of Aldenberg; German noblewoman and abbess	c.October 1227	Louis IV>br />Landgrave of Thuringia	11 September 1227	a few weeks	Died of fever going on crusade.
Stephen the Posthumous; Hungarian prince	1236	Andrew II; King of Hungary and Croatia	21 September 1235	at least 2 months	
Robert II; Count of Artois	September 1250	Robert I Count of Artois	8 February 1250	7 months	Killed in battle.
Przemysł II; King of Poland	14 October 1257	Przemysł I Duke of Greater Poland	4 June 1257	4 months, 10 days	
Władysław of Legnica; Duke of Legnica	6 June 1296	Henry V, Duke of Legnica; Duke of Legnica	22 February 1296	4 months	Illness following imprisonment.
John I King of France and Navarre	15 November 1316	Louis X King of France and Navarre	5 June 1316	5 months, 10 days	Pneumonia or pleurisy from drinking excess cooled wine after a real tennis match.
Isabel de Verdun; Baroness Ferrers de Groby	21 March 1317	Theobald de Verdun; Justiciar of Ireland	27 July 1316	7 months, 22 days	Typhoid.
Maria of Calabria; Latin Empress consort of Constantinople	6 May 1329	Charles; Duke of Calabria	9 November 1328	5 months, 27 days	
John, 3rd Earl of Kent	7 April 1330	Edmund of Woodstock; English prince	19 March 1330	19 days	Executed for treason against his nephew, Edward III of England.
Charles Martel, Duke of Calabria	25 December 1345	Andrew, Duke of Calabria	18 September 1345	3 months	
Joan of France	May 1351	Philip VI; King of France and Navarre	22 August 1350	9 months	
Gerhard VII, Count of Holstein-Rendsburg Duke of Schleswig, Count of Holstein	1404	Gerhard VI, Count of Holstein-Rendsburg	4 August 1404		Killed in the Battle on the Hamme
William of Bavaria-Munich	1435	William III; Duke of Bavaria	12 September 1435	up to 3 months	
Joan of Portugal; Consort queen of Castile	31 March 1439	Edward, King of Portugal	9 September 1438	6 months, 22 days	Plague.
Ladislaus VI; King of Hungary, Bohemia and Archduke of Austria	22 February 1440	Albert II; King of Germany, Bohemia and Hungary	27 October 1439	3 months, 23 days	
Enrique de Aragón y Pimentel; Count of Ampurias	25 July 1445	Henry, Duke of Villena; Count of Ampurias	15 June 1445	1 month	Stroke after being wounded in First Battle of Olmedo.
Henry VII; King of England	28 January 1457	Edmund Tudor; Earl of Richmond	1 or 3 November 1456	2 months, 25 days	Bubonic plague.
John Louis; Count of Nassau-Saarbrücken	19 October 1472	John II; Duke of Nassau-Saarbrücken	15 July 1472	3 months, 4 days	
James III; King of Cyprus	6 August 1473	James II; King of Cyprus	10 July 1473	1 month	Allegedly poisoned by Venetian agents.
Mencía Pacheco; Castilian noblewoman	1474–1475	Juan Pacheco; Marquis of Villena	1 October 1474		Throat ailment.
Clement VII; Pope of the Catholic Church	26 May 1478	Giuliano de' Medici; Ruler of the Florentine Republic	26 April 1478	1 month	Assassination in the Pazzi Conspiracy.

=== 16th–18th centuries ===
Name	Born	Late parent	Parent died	Gap	Cause of parent's death
Catherine of Austria; Queen consort of Portugal	14 January 1507	Philip I King of Castile and Duke of Burgundy	25 September 1506	3 months, 18 days	Typhoid or poison.
Alexander Stewart; Duke of Ross	30 April 1514	James IV; King of Scotland	9 September 1513	7 months, 21 days	Killed at the Battle of Flodden.
Görvel Fadersdotter Sparre; Swedish noblewoman	1517	Fader Nilsson (Sparre)	1515		
Wenceslaus III Adam; Duke of Cieszyn	December 1524	Wenceslaus II; Duke of Cieszyn	17 November 1524	1 month	
Henry Berkeley; Baron Berkeley	26 November 1534	Thomas Berkeley; Baron Berkeley	19 September 1534	9 weeks, 4 days	
Porzia de' Medici; Italian missionary nun	1537	Alessandro de' Medici; Duke of Florence	6 January 1537	several months	Her illegitimate father was assassinated
Duarte; Duke of Guimarães	March 1541	Duarte; Duke of Guimarães	20 September 1540	7 months	
Françoise d'Orléans-Longueville; Wife of Louis I of Bourbon	5 April 1549	François d'Orléans; French nobleman	25 October 1548	5 months, 8 days	
Sebastian; King of Portugal	20 January 1554	João Manuel; Prince of Portugal	2 January 1554	18 days	Tuberculosis or diabetes. Sebastian was born heir apparent to the throne of Portugal as a result.
Maria of Hanau-Münzenberg	20 January 1562	Philipp III; Count of Hanau-Münzenberg	14 November 1561	2 months, 6 days	
Thomas Posthumous Hoby; English politician	October 1566	Sir Thomas Hoby; English Ambassador to France	13 July 1566	2-3 months	
Jaroslav II Bořita of Martinice	6 January 1582	Jaroslav I. Bořita of Martinice	1581		Accident
Ben Jonson; Elizabethan playwright	c. 11 June 1572	His father	April 1572	1–2 months	
Henry II; Prince of Condé	1 September 1588	Henry I Prince of Condé	5 Mar 1588	5 months, 23 days	Disease.
Charles of Austria; Bishop of Wroclaw	7 August 1590	Charles II; Archduke of Austria	10 July 1590	28 days	
Bengt Oxenstierna; Swedish statesman	19 October 1591	Bengt Gabrielsson Oxenstierna	15 April 1591		
Toyotomi Sadako; Wife of Kugyō Kujō Yukiie	1592	Toyotomi Hidekatsu	14 October 1592		Killed in Korean Campaign.
Sveinn "Skotti" Björnsson; Icelandic criminal	1596–1597	Björn Pétursson; Only Icelandic serial killer	1596		Executed for murder.
Thomas Herbert; Welsh seaman and author	15 May 1597	Richard Herbert; Justice of the Peace and Member of Parliament	15 October 1596 (buried)	7 months	
Christopher Vasa; Prince of Poland, Lithuania and Sweden	10 February 1598	Anne of Austria	10 February 1598	Same day	Disease
Friedrich Wilhelm II; Duke of Saxe-Altenburg	12 February 1603	Friedrich Wilhelm I Duke of Saxe-Weimar	7 July 1602	7 months, 5 days	
Joseph of Cupertino; Catholic saint	17 June 1603	Felice Desa; Apulian carpenter			
Abraham Cowley; English poet	1618	His father			
Elizabeth Gyllenhielm; Swedish noblewoman	1622	Charles Philip; Duke of Södermanland	25 January 1622		Disease during the 1622 siege of Narva.
Nils Brahe the younger	8 April 1533	Nils Brahe the Elder	21 November 1632		Wounded in the Battle of Lützen
François-Henri de Montmorency; Duke of Luxembourg	8 January 1628	François de Montmorency-Bouteville; Duke of Luxembourg	22 June 1627	6 months, 15 days	Executed for dueling.
Isaac Newton; English scientist	4 January 1643	Isaac Newton, Sr. English farmer	October 1642	3 months	
Gulielma Penn wife of William Penn, founder of Pennsylvania	February 1644	Sir William Springett; English Parliamentarian army officer	3 February 1644	a few days	Fever following Siege of Arundel.
Elisabeth Dorothea Wrangel	1644	Herman Wrangel; Governor of Livonia	10 December 1643		
Georg Albrecht II.	26 February 1648	Georg Albrecht I. Count of Erbach	25 November 1647		
William III; Stadholder of the Dutch Republic, King of England, Scotland and Ireland	14 November 1650	William II; Stadtholder of the Dutch Republic	6 November 1650	8 days	Smallpox.
Robert Molesworth; Irish politician and writer	7 September 1656	Robert Molesworth, Sr.	3 September 1656	4 days	
Adolphus Frederick II; Duke of Mecklenburg-Strelitz	19 October 1658	Adolphus Frederick I Duke of Mecklenburg-Schwerin	27 February 1658	7 months, 21 days	
Jonathan Swift; Author of Gulliver's Travels	30 November 1667	Jonathan Swift, Sr. English lawyer in Ireland	c. April 1667	7 months	Syphilis.
William August; Duke of Saxe-Eisenach	30 November 1668	Adolf William, Duke of Saxe-Eisenach; Duke of Saxe-Eisenach	21 November 1668	9 days	
Thomas Greenhill; English surgeon	1669?	William Greenhill			
Emmanuel Lebrecht; Prince of Anhalt-Köthen	20 May 1671	Emmanuel; Prince of Anhalt-Köthen	8 November 1670	6 months	
Godscall Paleologue; Last known member of the Paleologus dynasty	12 January 1694	Theodorious Paleologus; Barbadian privateer	August–December 1693	Up to 5 months	
Christine Marie Jacqueline Henriette FitzJames; French nun	29 May 1703	Henry FitzJames; Jacobite peer	16 December 1702	5 months, 13 days	
Edward Ward, 9th Baron Dudley; British peer	16 June 1704	Edward Ward, 8th Baron Dudley	28 March 1704	2 months, 15 days	Smallpox.
Frederick Christian; Margrave of Brandenburg-Bayreuth	17 July 1708	Christian Henry; Margrave of Brandenburg-Kulmbach	5 April 1708	3 months, 12 days	
Georg Wilhelm Richmann; Livonian physicist	22 July 1711	His father			Plague.
William IV; Stadholder of the Dutch Republic	1 September 1711	John William Friso; Prince of Orange	14 July 1711	1 month, 15 days	Drowning in a ferryboat accident.
Robert Petre, 8th Baron Petre; British peer and horticulturist	3 June 1713	Robert Petre, 7th Baron Petre	22 March 1713	2 months, 7 days	Smallpox.
Edmund Pendleton; American politician	9 September 1721	Henry Pendleton	1721	4 months	
John Morton; American politician	1725	John Morton, Sr.	1724		
Sir Brook Bridges, 3rd Baronet; British politician	17 September 1733	Sir Brook Bridges, 2nd Baronet	23 May 1733	3 months, 22 days	
Barbara Herbert; Countess of Powis	24 June 1735	Edward Herbert; British aristocrat	c. March 1735	3 months	
Caroline Matilda; Queen consort of Denmark and Norway	11 July 1751	Frederick, Prince of Wales	20 March 1751	3 months, 17 days	Pulmonary embolism.
Thomas Chatterton; English poet and forger	20 November 1752	Thomas Chatterton Sr. English poet and musician	7 August 1752	3 months, 13 days	
John Hamilton, 1st Marquess of Abercorn; Irish peer and politician	July 1756	John Hamilton, Sr. Royal Navy officer	December 1755	7 months	Accidental drowning while on duty.
Magnus Fredrik Brahe; Swedish Lord Marshal	15 October 1756	Erik Brahe; Count and politician	23 July 1756	3 months	Execution for treason after the Coup of 1756.
Frederick Ferdinand Constantin; Prince of Saxe-Weimar-Eisenach	8 September 1758	Ernest Augustus II; Duke of Saxe-Weimar-Eisenach	28 May 1758	3 months	
Marie Tussaud; French wax artist	1 December 1761	Joseph Grosholtz	Sep-Oct 1761	2 months	
Elizabeth Simcoe; British Canadian artist	22 September 1762	Thomas Gwillim; Military officer	29 January 1762	7 months, 22 days	Killed or died otherwise in the Seven Years' War.
Benedict Joseph Flaget; French American bishop	7 November 1763	His father			
Andrew Jackson; 7th President of the United States	15 March 1767	Andrew Jackson, Sr. Irish American colonist	c. 23 February 1767	Around 21 days	Logging accident.
Lord William Russell; British politician	20 August 1767	Francis Russell; Marquess of Tavistock	22 March 1767	5 months	Fall from horse.
Sawai Madhavrao; 12th Peshwa of the Maratha Empire	18 April 1774	Narayan Rao; 10th Peshwa of the Maratha Empire	30 August 1773	7 months	Murder.
Tenskwatawa; Shawnee prophet and leader	January 1775	Puckenshinwa; Leader of the Kispokotha division of the Shawnee tribe	10 October 1774	3–4 months	Killed at the Battle of Point Pleasant.
Henry Howard, 13th Earl of Suffolk; Hereditary peer	8 August 1779	Henry Howard, 12th Earl of Suffolk; British hereditary peer and politician	7 March 1779	5 months, 1 day	

=== 19th century ===
Name	Born	Late parent	Parent died	Gap	Cause of parent's death
Lord George Hill; British politician	9 December 1801	Arthur Hill, 2nd Marquess of Downshire	7 September 1801	3 months, 2 days	Suicide.
Louis Augustus Karl Frederick Emil; Duke of Anhalt-Köthen	20 September 1802	Louis; Prince of Anhalt-Köthen	16 September 1802	4 days	
William Holland Thomas; American merchant, lawyer, politician, soldier.	5 February 1805	Richard Thomas	??	??	Believed drowned.
Sir George Grey; British soldier, explorer, governor	14 April 1812	Lt-Col George Grey	Early April 1812	a few days	Killed at the Battle of Badajoz.
Arthur MacArthur Sr. Governor of Wisconsin and grandfather of Douglas MacArthur	26 January 1815	Arthur MacArthur I	19 January 1815	7 days	
François Sabatier-Ungher; French philanthropist	2 July 1818	His father	shortly before	??	
Charles de La Roche	30 March 1820	Charles Ferdinand; Duke of Berry	14 February 1820	1 month, 16 days	Assassination by a Bonapartist. Each child was born to a different mother.
Alix Mélanie Cosnefroy de Saint-Ange	16 September 1820	Charles Ferdinand; Duke of Berry	14 February 1820	7 months, 2 days	Assassination by a Bonapartist. Each child was born to a different mother.
Henri, Count of Chambord; Legitimist pretender to the French throne	29 September 1820	Charles Ferdinand; Duke of Berry	14 February 1820	7 months, 15 days	Assassination by a Bonapartist. Each child was born to a different mother.
Ferdinand Oreille de Carrière	10 October 1820	Charles Ferdinand; Duke of Berry	14 February 1820	7 months, 25 days	Assassination by a Bonapartist. Each child was born to a different mother.
Rutherford B. Hayes; 19th President of the United States	4 October 1822	Rutherford Hayes, Jr. American storekeeper	20 July 1822	1 month, 22 days	
Jemima Blackburn; Scottish painter	1 May 1823	James Wedderburn; Solicitor General for Scotland	7 November 1822	5 months, 23 days	
Anna Leonowens; British teacher co-subject of The King and I	5 November 1831	Thomas Edwards; East India Company officer	c. August 1831	3 months	
Henry B. Wheatley; English author, editor and indexer	1838	Benjamin Wheatley; Auctioneer			
David Hyrum Smith; Leader of the RLDS Church	7 November 1844	Joseph Smith; Founder of the Latter Day Saint movement	27 June 1844	4 months, 9 days	Lynching while awaiting trial in jail.
Tokugawa Iemochi; 14th shogun of Tokugawa shogunate	17 July 1846	Tokugawa Nariyuki; Lord of Wakayama Domain	1 June 1846	1 month, 16 days	
Chikako, Princess Kazu; Wife of Tokugawa Iemochi	1 August 1846	Ninkō; Emperor of Japan	21 February 1846	5 months, 9 days	
Horace Tabberer Brown; British chemist	20 July 1848	His father			
Henry Waldegrave, 11th Earl Waldegrave; British minister and noble	14 October 1854	William Waldegrave, Viscount Chewton	8 October 1854	6 days	Wounds from the Battle of the Alma.
Katherine Harley; British suffragist	3 May 1855	John Tracy William French; Royal Navy officer	1854		
John Norton; English-Australian journalist	25 January 1858	John Norton; Stonemason			
Samuel Alexander; British philosopher	6 January 1859	Samuel Alexander, Sr. Australian saddler			
Motilal Nehru; 36th and 47th President of the Indian National Congress	6 May 1861	Gangadhar Nehru; Last Kotwal of Delhi	4 February 1861	3 months, 2 days	
Florence Maybrick; British-American convicted murderess	3 September 1862	William George Chandler; Banker and Mayor of Mobile			
Breaker Morant; Australian soldier and folk hero	9 December 1864	Edwin Murrant; English workhouse master	August 1864	4 months	
William George; Welsh solicitor	23 February 1865	William George; Welsh schoolteacher	June 1864	8 months	pneumonia
Frank Anstey; Australian politician	18 August 1865	Samuel Anstey; English iron miner	c. March 1865	5 months	
Rua Kenana Hepetipa; Maori prophet, faith healer, and activist	1869	Kenana Tumoana	November 1868		Killed in Te Kooti's War.
George Washington Lambert; Australian artist	13 September 1873	George Washington Lambert, Sr.	25 July 1873	1 month, 16 days	
William Lionel Hichens; English industrialist	1 May 1874	John Ley Hichens; English physician & army surgeon			
Rudolf Besier; Dutch/English dramatist	2 July 1878	Rudolf Besier, Sr.	c. January 1878	c. 6 months	
Edwin William Gruffydd Richards; Welsh Olympian hockey player	15 December 1879	Edwin William Richards; Welsh ironmonger	3 September 1879	3 months, 12 days	Typhoid.
Carl Schuricht; German conductor	3 July 1880	Carl Conrad Schuricht	June 1880	c. 21 days	Drowned in the Baltic Sea while trying to save a friend.
Charles Edward; Duke of Saxe-Coburg and Gotha	19 July 1884	Leopold, Duke of Albany; British prince	28 March 1884	3 months, 18 days	Haemophilia-related intracerebral hemorrhage after a fall.
Chester W. Nimitz; American fleet admiral	24 February 1885	Chester Bernard Nimitz	14 August 1884	6 months, 10 days	
Abd al-Rahman al-Mahdi; Sudanese Imam of the Ansar, first Chief Minister of Sudan	15 July 1885	Muhammad Ahmad; Sudanese self-proclaimed Mahdi	22 June 1885	23 days	Typhus.
Clara Sipprell; Canadian-American photographer	31 October 1885	Francis Sipprell			
Alfonso XIII; King of Spain	17 May 1886	Alfonso XII; King of Spain	25 November 1885	5 months, 21 days	Dysentery worsened by tuberculosis.
Li Dazhao; Co-founder of the Chinese Communist Party	29 October 1889	His father		A few months	
Manuel Roxas; President of the Philippines	1 January 1892	Gerardo Roxas y Arroyo	21 April 1891	8 months, 11 days	Killed by the Civil Guard
Charles Wilfred Orr; English song composer	31 July 1893	His father Indian Army officer			Tuberculosis.
Thomas Iorwerth Ellis; Welsh classicist	19 December 1899	Thomas Edward Ellis; Welsh politician	5 April 1899	8 months, 14 days	
Mabel Mercer; British-American jazz singer	3 February 1900	Her father			

=== 20th century ===
Name	Born	Late parent	Parent died	Gap	Cause of parent's death
Stanley Kunitz; American poet	28 July 1905	Solomon Z. Kunitz; Immigrant Russian Jewish dressmaker	June 1905	6 weeks	Suicide by drinking carbolic acid after going bankrupt.
Johan Kjær Hansen; Danish Resistance fighter	7 April 1907	Hans Christian Johan Andreas Hansen; Bicycle manufacturer	13 December 1906	3 months, 22 days	
Menachem Mendel Futerfas; Chabad hasid	22 September 1907	Menachem Mendel Futerfas			
Xiao Qian; Chinese essayist and translator	27 January 1910	His father			
Roberta Semple Salter; American Pentecostal church leader	17 September 1910	Robert James Semple; Irish Pentecostal missionary	19 August 1910	29 days	Malaria and dysentery.
John Jacob Astor VI; American shipping businessman	14 August 1912	John Jacob Astor IV; American businessman	15 April 1912	3 months, 28 days	Drowned in the sinking of the RMS Titanic.
Raoul Wallenberg; Swedish diplomat and humanitarian	14 August 1912	Raoul Oscar Wallenberg; Swedish Navy officer	May 1912	3 months	Cancer.
Red Skelton; American comedian	18 July 1913	Joseph Elmer Skelton; Grocer and former circus clown	May 1913	2 months	
Cäzilia Gabriel; Hinterkaifeck victim	January 1915	Karl Gabriel; German soldier	December 1914	1 month	Killed in World War I.
Georg Quistgaard; Danish Resistance fighter	19 February 1915	Georg Brockhoff Quistgaard; Danish secretary	18 December 1914	2 months, 1 day	
Fred Ball; Film studio executive	17 July 1915	Henry Durell Ball; Telephone lineman	28 February 1915	139 days	Died of typhoid fever.
Alfred Shaughnessy; English screenwriter and producer	19 May 1916	Thomas Alfred Shaughnessy; Canadian Army officer	31 March 1916	50 days	Killed in World War I.
Mihrişah Sultan; Ottoman princess	1 June 1916	Yusuf Izzeddin; Ottoman Crown Prince	1 February 1916	4 months	Suicide.
Ronald R. Van Stockum; Brigadier General of the U.S. Marines	8 July 1916	Reginald George Bareham; British soldier	1 July 1916	1 week	Killed in the Battle of the Somme during World War I.
Edward Bell, Jr. Squadron Leader of the Royal Air Force	October 1918	Edward Bell, Sr. Commander of the Football Battalion	24 March 1918	6 months	Killed in World War I.
Aleksandr Solzhenitsyn; Russian novelist	11 December 1918	Isaakiy Semyonovich Solzhenitsyn; Imperial Russian Army officer	15 June 1918	5 months, 25 days	Hunting accident.
Lawrence Ferlinghetti; American poet	24 March 1919	Carlo Ferlinghetti; Italian immigrant			Heart attack.
John Mitchum; American actor	6 September 1919	James Thomas Mitchum	February 1919	7 months	Railyard accident.
Jehanne Rosemary Ernestine Beaumont	7 September 1919	Dudley Beaumont; British Army officer	24 November 1918	9 months	Spanish flu.
Kung Te-cheng; Last Duke Yansheng	23 February 1920	Kong Lingyi; Duke Yansheng	8 November 1919	3 months, 15 days	
Alexandra; Last queen consort of Yugoslavia	25 March 1921	Alexander; King of Greece	25 October 1920	5 months	Sepsis from a captive Barbary macaque's bite.
Jules Olitski; Ukrainian-American painter, sculptor	27 March 1922	Jevel Demikovsky; Soviet Commissar		A few months	Executed by the Soviet government.
Elisabeth of Austria; Member of the House of Habsburg-Lorraine	31 May 1922	Charles I Last Emperor of Austria and King of Hungary	1 April 1922	1 month, 30 days	Pneumonia.
Stephen Wurm; Hungarian-Australian linguist	19 August 1922	Adolphe Wurm			
Mary Warnock; English philosopher	14 April 1924	Archibald Edward Wilson; Teacher at Winchester College	1923	7 months	Diphtheria.
Anthony Earnshaw; English anarchist	9 October 1924	His father			
Felipe Rodríguez; Puerto Rican singer	8 May 1926	His father			
Earl Holliman; American actor	11 September 1928	William A. Frost; American farmer		6 months	
Zhu Rongji; Former premier of China	23 October 1928	Zhu Kuanshu; 16th grandson of Hongwu Emperor			
Bertram Wainer; Australian doctor and activist	30 December 1928	His father			
Itamar Franco; 33rd President of Brazil	28 June 1930	Augusto César Stiebler Franco	April 1930	2 months	Malaria.
Thomas Sowell; American economist	30 June 1930	His father			
Brian Sewell; British art critic	15 July 1931	Peter Warlock; British composer and music critic (paternity claimed by Sewell)	17 December 1930	6 months, 26 days	Coal gas poisoning.
Don Durant; American actor	20 November 1932	His father	September–October 1932	2 months	Truck accident.
Saddam Hussein; Iraqi dictator	28 April 1937	Hussein Abd Al-Majid			Cancer.
Ian Brady; British serial killer	2 January 1938	His father (according to his mother)		3 months	Unknown. Brady's father was never identified, casting doubt on his mother's claims.
Lee Harvey Oswald; Assassin of John F. Kennedy	18 October 1939	Robert Edward Lee Oswald; Army veteran of WWI	19 August 1939	1 month, 28 days	Heart attack.
Jacques Mairesse; French economist	16 August 1940	Jacques Mairesse, Sr. French footballer	13 June 1940	2 months, 3 days	Killed while trying to escape a prisoner-of-war camp during the Battle of France.
William Gummow; Australian High Court judge	9 October 1942	His father			
Edwin Wilson; Australian poet	27 October 1942	His father			
Henry and David Cecil; British twin racehorse trainers	11 January 1943	Henry Kerr Auchmuty Cecil; Parachute Regiment officer	30 November – 2 December 1942	1 month, 1–2 days	Killed in the North African campaign of World War II.
Sylvester McCoy; British actor and comedian	20 August 1943	Percy Kent-Smith	18 July 1943	1 month, 2 days	Killed in World War II.
Ranulph Fiennes; British explorer and writer	7 March 1944	Ranulph Twisleton-Wykeham-Fiennes; Royal Scots Greys commander	24 November 1943	3 months, 12 days	Killed by landmine in Italy while serving in World War II.
John Pelham; Earl of Chichester	14 April 1944	John Pelham, Sr. British diplomat and Captain of the Scots Guards	21 February 1944	1 month, 22 days	Killed in a road accident while serving in World War II.
Maria João Pires; Portuguese-Swiss classical pianist	23 July 1944	João Baptista Pires	1 July 1944	22 days	
Bernard Collaery; Australian lawyer and politician	12 October 1944	Edward Francis Collaery; RAAF flying officer	29 June 1944	3 months 13 days	Killed in World War II.
Edward Foljambe; Earl of Liverpool	14 November 1944	Peter George William Savile Foljambe	2 September 1944	2 months, 12 days	Killed in World War II.
Joachim; 8th Prince Murat	26 November 1944	Joachim; 7th Prince Murat	20 July 1944	4 months, 6 days	Killed in World War II.
Konstanze von Schulthess; German author	27 January 1945	Claus von Stauffenberg; German army officer	21 July 1944	6 months, 6 days	Executed for 20 July plot against Hitler.
Eva Barbara Fegelein	5 May 1945	Hermann Fegelein; High-ranking Nazi officer	28 April 1945	6 days	Execution.
Frederica von Stade; American opera singer	1 June 1945	Charles S. von Stade; American polo champion	10 April 1945	1 month, 20 days	Killed in World War II.
Graça Machel; Mozambican politician	17 October 1945	Her father	30 September 1945	17 days	
Bill Clinton; 42nd President of the United States	19 August 1946	William Jefferson Blythe Jr. American traveling salesman	17 May 1946	3 months, 2 days	Drowned in the context of an automobile accident.
Peter Kocan; Australian author and attempted assassin of Arthur Calwell	4 May 1947	His father		3 months	Automobile accident.
Pedro López; Colombian serial killer	8 October 1948	Midardo Reyes	4 April 1948	6 months, 4 days	Murdered in La Violencia.
Jett Williams; American singer	6 January 1953	Hank Williams; American singer	1 January 1953	5 days	Possibly drug-induced cardiac arrest.
Wally Carr; Aboriginal Australian boxer	11 August 1954	His father		2 months	Suicide by gunshot.
Janet Lynn Skinner; American Gospel musician	5 July 1955	Billie Haille			Spinal meningitis.
Ahmed bin Saeed Al Maktoum; President of the Dubai Civil Aviation Authority and founder of The Emirates Group	1 December 1958	Saeed bin Maktoum bin Hasher Al Maktoum; Emir of Dubai	9 September 1958	2 months, 21 days	Old age, his father was 80 year old.
Tyrone Power Jr. American actor	22 January 1959	Tyrone Power; American actor	15 November 1958	2 months, 7 days	Suffered a fulminant angina pectoris while filming an action scene.
Antwone Fisher; American author and film director	3 August 1959	Eddie Elkins		2 months	Murdered (shot) by a former girlfriend.
John Clark Gable; American actor	20 March 1961	Clark Gable; American actor	16 November 1960	4 months, 4 days	Heart attack induced by an arterial blood clot.
Yves Amu Klein; French artist	6 August 1962	Yves Klein; French Nouveau réalisme artist	6 June 1962	2 months	Three heart attacks, the first while watching the exploitation film Mondo Cane.
Sławomir Makaruk; Polish traveler and photographer	4 October 1963	Sławomir Makaruk; Polish aviator	20 April 1963	5 months, 13 days	Accident aboard an experimental SZD-21 Kobuz glider.
Tariq Al-Ali; Kuwaiti actor and comedian	18 January 1966	His father			
Rory Kennedy; American documentary filmmaker	12 December 1968	Robert F. Kennedy; U.S. Senator from New York and younger brother of President John F. Kennedy	6 June 1968	6 months, 6 days	Assassination while campaigning for the 1968 Democratic Party presidential primaries.
Fred Hampton Jr. American political activist	29 December 1969	Fred Hampton; American Marxist-Leninist revolutionary and deputy chairman of the Black Panther Party	4 December 1969	25 days	Killed by the Chicago Police Department in a raid. The status of this as an assassination is somewhat disputed; however many sources see this as an assassination or at least a politically motivated extrajudicial execution, with support from the FBI's COINTELPRO program.
Brandon Teena; American victim of transphobic hate murder	12 December 1972	Patrick Brandon	7 April 1972	8 months, 5 days	Automobile accident.
Philippe Cousteau Jr. Franco-American oceanographer and environmental activist	20 January 1980	Philippe Cousteau; French cinematographer	28 June 1979	6 months, 21 days	Aviation accident.
Diana Yukawa; Japanese-British violinist and composer	16 September 1985	Akihisa Yukawa; Japanese banker	12 August 1985	1 month, 4 days	Japan Air Lines Flight 123 crash.
Natasha Ignatenko; Chernobyl disaster victim	1986	Vasily Ignatenko; Soviet firefighter	13 May 1986		Acute Radiation Syndrome contracted while extinguishing fires above the exploded Reactor Nº4.
Gia Coppola; American filmmaker	1 January 1987	Gian-Carlo Coppola; American film producer and eldest child of Francis Ford Coppola	26 May 1986	7 months, 3 days	Speedboating accident.
Gilles Pironi; French Formula 1 engineer	23 August 1987	Didier Pironi; French Formula 1 driver	6 January 1988	4 months, 14 days	Speedboating accident.

== Posthumous birth after the mother's death ==
It can happen that the mother dies before giving birth. This usually results in the death of the child, but in exceptional cases the child, surgically removed from the mother's womb, can survive.

There is only a handful of such records. The most famous is perhaps the case of Raymond Nonnatus (1204–1240), the Spanish saint in the Middle Ages, who was born this way. His Latin adjective also suggests this ("unborn").

Another instance was Christopher Vasa, Prince of Polish–Lithuanian Commonwealth and Kingdom of Sweden, who was the youngest child of King Sigismund Vasa and Queen Anne of Austria. Anne died while still pregnant and her son was delivered alive via caesarean section. The newborn Prince ultimately died few minutes after birth, on 10 February 1598.

A similar case is reported by Andrea Majocchi (1876–1965), an Italian doctor who mentions in his book a case where two live babies were removed from their mother's womb before delivery and brought to the doctor, but there they suddenly died.

In 2024, a Palestinian baby was removed from her mother's womb at 30 weeks gestation after her mother was killed in a drone strike. The baby died in the incubator a few days later.

Modern medical technologies allow homeostasis and overall organ function to be maintained in brain-dead pregnant women to ensure proper development of the fetus, leading to the successful delivery of a healthy child.

The so-called coffin birth is strongly distinguished from the "birth" after the death of the mother. This is the inverse of the former. Here the baby is actually born but is already dead. It differs from the normal stillbirth in that here the mother is already dead too, and only the decomposition gases / contraction of the body inside her push out the baby's also dead body.

== Religious and mythological people born posthumously ==
The Bible's Old Testament mentions two named cases of posthumous children:

- Ashhur, youngest son of Hezron, born when his father had died when aged past 60 years. (1 Chronicles 2:21, 24)
- Ichabod, who was born when his mother, who subsequently died, heard news that his father Phinehas had been killed at the Battle of Aphek and paternal grandfather Eli accidentally killed afterwards. (1 Samuel 4:19–22)

=== Indian mythology ===
- Parikshit, the sole survivor of the Kuru dynasty in Mahabharata, was born after his father Abhimanyu was killed in the Kurukshetra War.

=== Greek mythology ===
- The medicine god Asclepius is said to have been delivered by caesarean section after his mother Coronis was killed by his aunt Artemis.
- The wine god Dionysus is said to have been rescued from the ashes of his mother Semele after she is unwillingly incinerated by his father Zeus while she was pregnant with him. Zeus then sews Dionysus to his groin until he is fully born.

=== Celtic mythology ===
- Fionn mac Cumhaill, born after his father Cumhall mac Trénmhoir was killed in battle.
- Máel Dúin, son of the warrior Ailill Ochair Aghra

== Fictional characters born posthumously ==
- Macduff, a character in Shakespeare's Macbeth, revealed that he was not literally born, but removed from his [dead] mother, completing a plot twist.
- In Gabrielle-Suzanne de Villeneuve's fairy tale Beauty and the Beast, the Prince's father, the King, died months before he was born.
- The Charles Dickens character David Copperfield was a posthumous child, whose father had died six months before he was born. Another Dickens character, Oliver Twist, was posthumous as his mother died while giving birth.
- The Irish Republican song "The Broad Black Brimmer" was about a boy whose father died before he was born.
- In The Adventures of Sinbad: TV series 11th episode "The Prince Who Wasn't" A man tries to eradicate his brother's bloodline by murdering his brother and only nephew. It is later revealed that his sister-in-law is pregnant.
- On A Nightmare on Elm Street 5: The Dream Child, baby Jacob was born after his father Dan was killed by Freddy.
- In The Hunger Games series, Gale Hawthorne's sister Posy is born shortly after their father dies in a mine explosion, and Finnick Odair's son is born months after his death in battle.
- John Connor, a principal character in the Terminator franchise, and son of Sarah Connor and Kyle Reese (a time traveler from the future), was conceived shortly before his father was killed. As an adult, John was in fact responsible for selecting Reese (who was unaware of their relation) to go back in time.
- The Noughts & Crosses series character Callie-Rose Hadley is born after the execution of her father, Callum McGregor.
- In the British television soap opera Coronation Street, Liam Connor Jr. was born in July 2009; his father and namesake Liam Connor, was ordered murdered by Tony Gordon just a short time after Liam Jr.'s conception in October 2008.
- The Stephen King novel Carrie tells briefly of the parents of the titular character, Margaret and Ralph White. Ralph, a construction worker, had impregnated Margaret, only to be killed in a construction accident shortly before the birth of their daughter.
- In Berserk, the main character Guts is found after having been birthed by a hanging corpse.
- Grey's Anatomy: Derek Shepherd dies in a car accident in Season 11, nine months before the birth of his daughter.
- Bahubali series: Mahendra Bahubali is born shortly after his father Amarendra Bahubali is killed.
- Star Wars Rebels: Kanan Jarrus dies sacrificing himself while rescuing his lover Hera Syndulla, who is pregnant with their son, Jacen Syndulla.
- In A Song of Ice and Fire, Princess Daenerys Targaryen is born months after the death of her father, King Aerys II Targaryen.
- Avatar series: Grace Augustine's human form was killed by Colonel Miles Quaritch, but her unconscious Avatar body was kept in stasis and later gave birth to Kiri.
- In the Bridgerton novels and its Netflix adaptation, the youngest child Hyacinth is born in the weeks following her father's death from anaphylactic shock from a bee sting.
- Death Stranding: The series protagonist, Sam Porter Bridges, was born to a brain-dead woman named Lisa Bridges at the behest of the UCA and with the consent of Sams father and Lisas common law husband Cliff Unger in the interest of learning more about recently discovered ties between the worlds of the living and the dead. This specific iteration of what was known as the "Bridge Baby" experiments was the catalyst for a brief series of events that would cause a world crippling catastrophe later known as the Death Stranding.

== See also ==
- Coffin birth
- Maternal death
- Posthumous sperm retrieval
