= Puke (disambiguation) =

Puke is slang for vomit.

Puke may also refer to:

- Puke (EP), the 1991 debut EP by American punk rock band Guttermouth
- HSwMS Puke (19), a Psilander-class destroyer of the Royal Swedish Navy from 1940 to 1947
- Johan Puke (1726–1756), Swedish military officer known for his role in the Coup of 1756 and his subsequent execution for treason
- Mont Puke, the highest point of Polynesian French island territory Wallis and Futuna
- Puke Ariki, a combined museum and library in New Plymouth, New Zealand
- Puke Lenden (born 1980), New Zealand professional basketball player
- Puke Puke Express, a former logging railway near Puke Puke, New Zealand
- Pukë District, a district in Albania
- Pukë, a town in Albania
- Te Puke, a town in New Zealand
- Te Puke Te Ao, a Māori member of the House of Representatives, tribal chieftain and farmer
- The ring name of American professional wrestler and NFL player Darren Drozdov (1969–2023)
- "Puke", a song by Eminem on his 2004 album Encore
- "Puke", a song by Beast Coast on their 2019 album Escape from New York

== See also ==
- Barf (disambiguation)
- Vomit (disambiguation)
