= Erik Brahe =

Erik Brahe may refer to:

- Erik Brahe (1722–1756), Swedish count executed for treason
- Erik Brahe (1552–1614), Swedish governor, councilor and count of Visingsborg
