= Magnus Fredrik Brahe =

Swedish Lord Marshal and Lord of the Realm

His Excellency The High Well-born Count Magnus Fredrik Brahe Lord of the Realm RoKavKMO KmstkNO
- Portrait by Carl Frederik von Breda.

Lord Marshal of Sweden
- In office 1800–1800
- Preceded by: Eric Ruuth
- Succeeded by: Michael Anckarsvärd

Personal details
- Born: 15 October 1756 Stockholm, Kingdom of Sweden
- Died: 12 December 1826 (aged 70) Stockholm, Kingdom of Sweden
- Resting place: Brahe family crypt, Östra Ryd Church, Uppland
- Party: Gustavian Party
- Spouse(s): Ulrica Catharina Koskull (m. 1779) Aurora Wilhelmina Koskull (m. 1806)
- Parent(s): Erik Brahe; Stina Piper
- Relatives: Brahe family
- Education: Uppsala University

Military service
- Allegiance: Kingdom of Sweden
- Branch/service: Royal Drabant Corps
- Rank: Captain lieutenant

Magnus Fredrik Brahe (15 October 1756 – 12 December 1826) was a Swedish noble and courtier.

== Biography ==
Magnus Fredrik Brahe was born on 15 October 1756 to Count Erik Brahe and his second wife Countess Stina Piper, three months after his father's death. Like his father, he supported absolute monarchical power. During the baptism of Crown Prince Gustav Adolph on 10 November 1778, Brahe was appointed godparent by King Gustav III of Sweden for which he received the Gustav III's Godparent Insignia on 27 December 1778 at the service. It was Brahe who carried Gustav Adolph at the baptismal font. He was also honoured the Lord of the Realm and Knight of the Seraphim titles.

His military career started by joining the Royal Drabant Corps and he quickly rose through the ranks to captain lieutenant. In 1787 however, Brahe requested resignation from military duty and joined the circle of nobles who opposed the King's vigorous plans of total power. He attended the Riksdag of 1789 and was arrested on 20 February 1789 by order of Gustav III for opposing the proposed Act of Union and Security. He was punished by home confinement but was released later that same year. While not being involved in the assassination of Gustav III, Brahe was briefly imprisoned following the murder.

At the end of his life, Brahe retired to the family residence Rydboholm Castle and initiated the construction of a grand English landscape garden. He married twice, first in 1779 with Baroness Ulrica Catharina Koskull, daughter of Baron Anders Gustav Koskull, and second in 1806 with Baroness Aurora Wilhelmina Koskull, daughter of Baron Otto Anders Koskull. In 1785 and 1811, he was initiated to the Swedish Order of Freemasons and became one of the first recipients of the Order of Charles XIII respectively. Along with his first wife, Brahe was accepted to the secret Yellow Rose society in January 1803 by Duke Charles, together with Count Eric Ruuth and his wife Charlotte Wahrendorff. Society members include Duke Charles himself, his wife Hedwig Elisabeth Charlotte and her mother Princess Amalie.

== Honours ==
=== National ===
- Sweden: Knight and Commander of the Orders of His Majesty the King (1794)
- Sweden: Knight of the Order of Charles XIII (1811)

=== Institutional ===
- Member of the Royal Swedish Academy of Agriculture (1806)
- Honorary Member of the Royal Swedish Academy of Fine Arts (1806)
- Honorary Member of the Royal Swedish Academy of Agriculture (1812)
- Member of the Society for Publication of Manuscripts on Scandinavian History (1815)

== Gallery ==
Portrait of Brahe as a child.

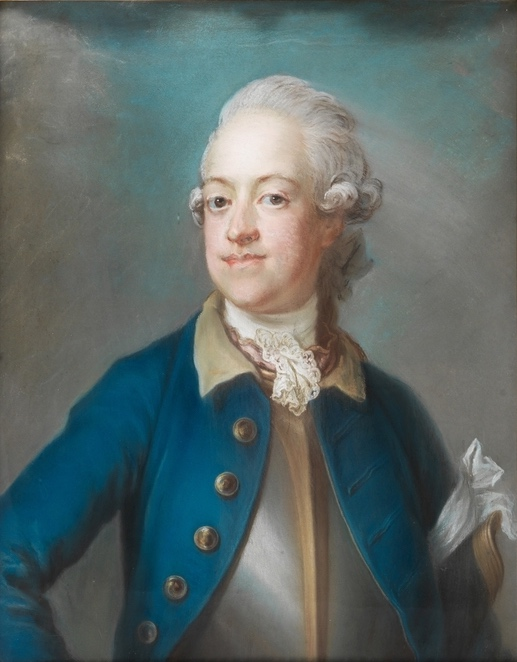
Portrait of Brahe in cuirass and the Uniform m/1756 of the Southern Scanian Cavalry Regiment by Gustaf Lundberg. Wears the bandage of the Coup of Gustav III on the left.

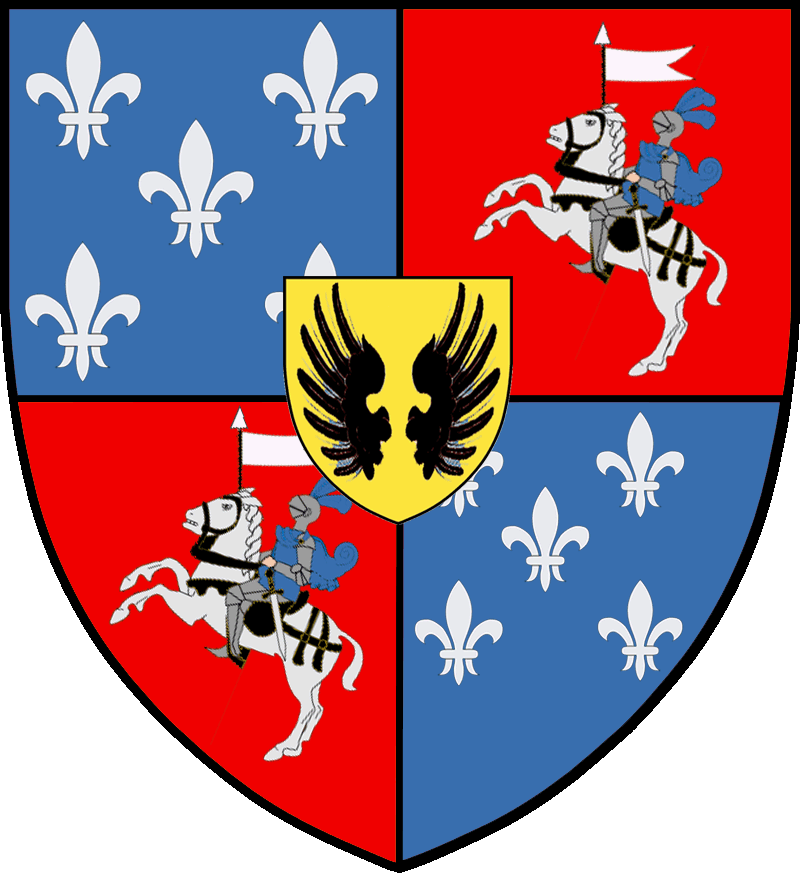
The comital coat of arms of the Swedish branch of the Brahe family.

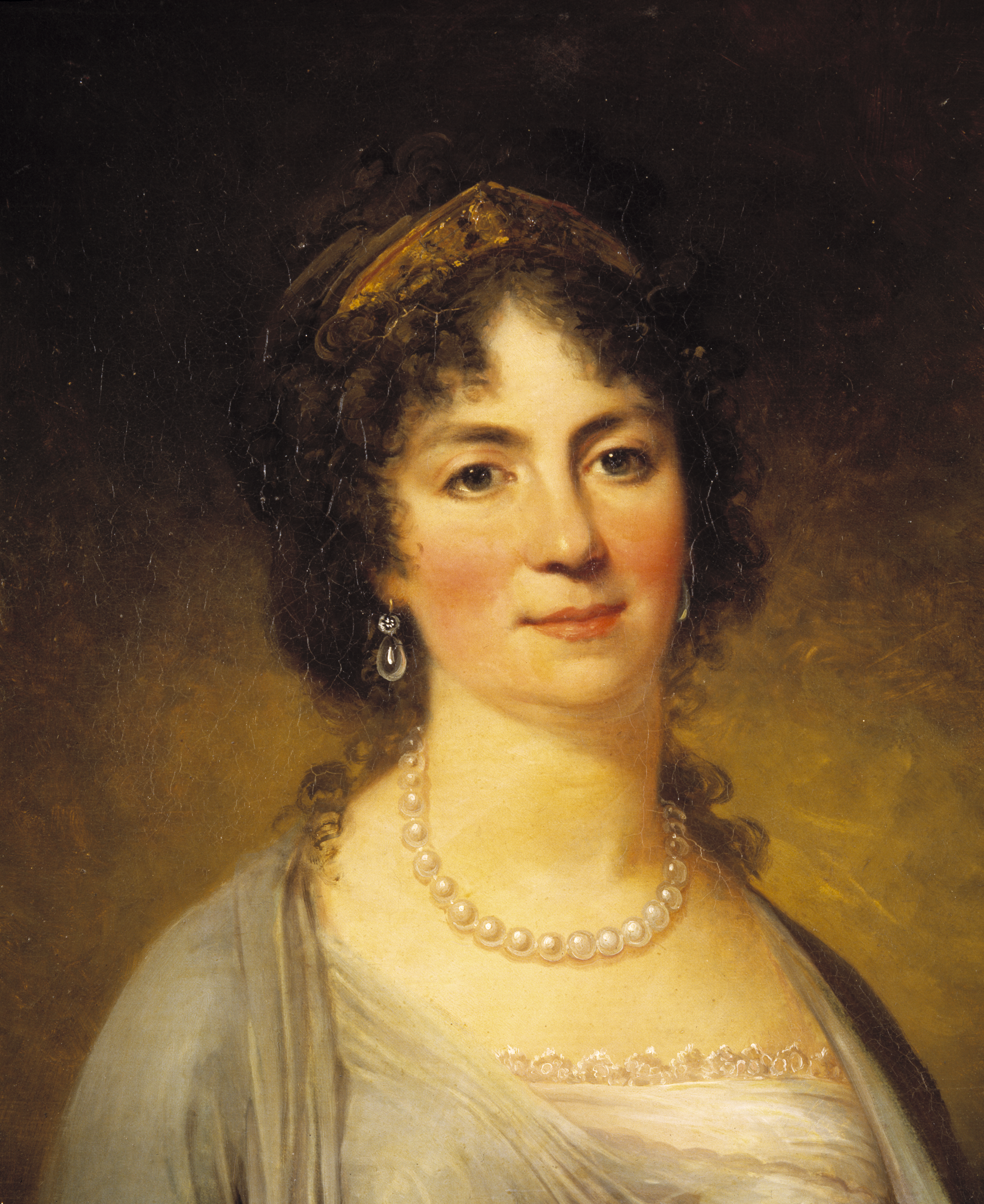
Portrait of Ulrica Catharina Koskull, his first wife, by Carl Frederik von Breda.

Portrait of Aurora Wilhelmina Koskull, his second wife, by Carl Wilhelm Nordgren.
