= Godscall Paleologue =

Last known member of the Paleologus family

- Born: 12 January 1694; London, England
- Died: Unknown
- Noble family: Paleologus
- Father: Theodore Paleologus
- Mother: Martha Bradbury

Godscall Paleologue or Paleologus (12 January 1694 – ?) was the last recorded living member of the Paleologus family, and through them possibly the last surviving member of the Palaiologos dynasty, rulers of the Byzantine Empire from 1259 to its fall in 1453. The posthumous daughter of privateer Theodore Paleologus, the only surviving source on Godscall is her baptismal records. Nothing is known of her life.

The meaning of her name is unknown. It might be an English equivalent of the Greek name Theocletiane (Θεοκλητιανή), a reference to the child possibly being sickly, a surname derived from one of her mother's ancestors, or might derive from one or both of her parents being Puritans (though there is no evidence that they were), who in the 17th century commonly gave godly names to their children.

== Biography ==
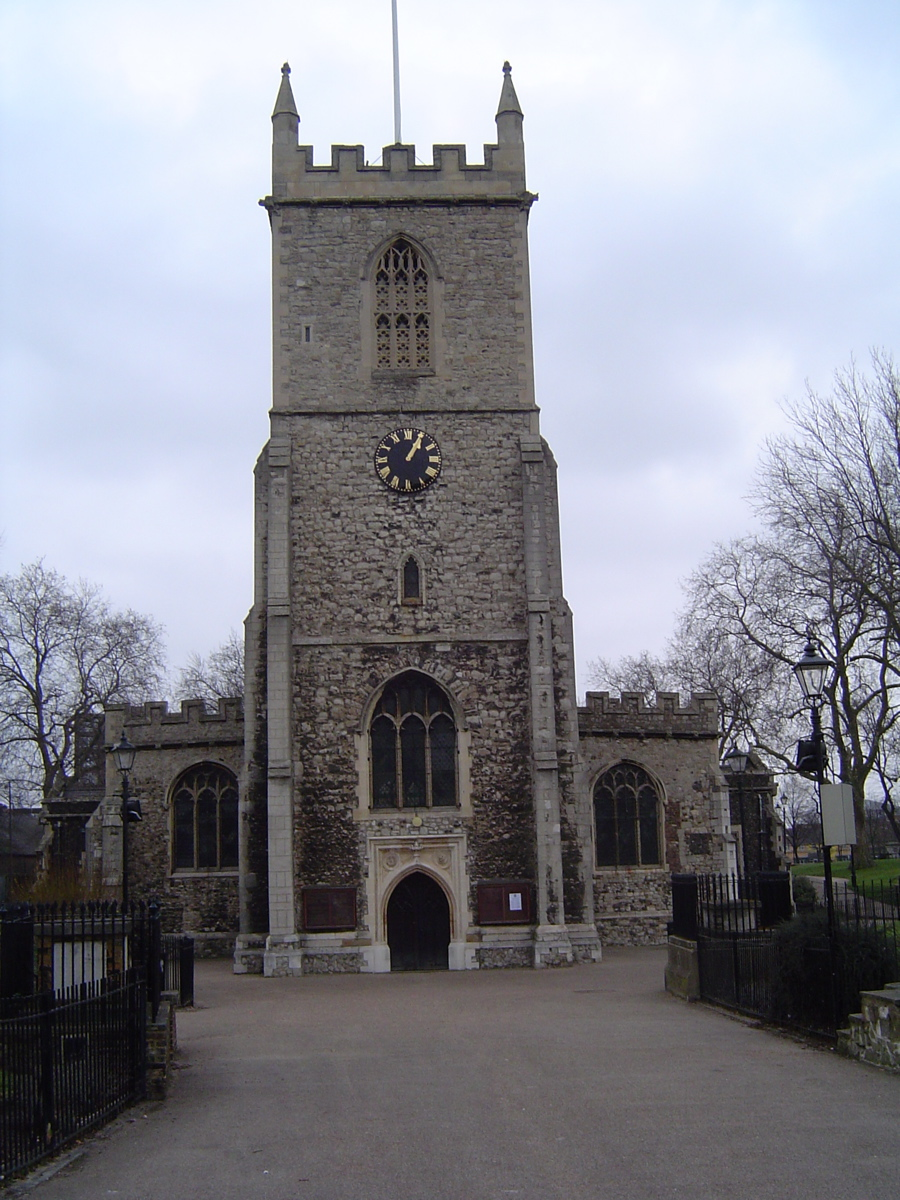
St Dunstan's, Stepney, where Godscall was baptised on 24 January 1694

Godscall Paleologue was born on 12 January 1694, the daughter of the privateer Theodore Paleologus, who had died the year before, and his wife Martha Bradbury. She was baptised twelve days later, on 24 January, at St Dunstan's Church, Stepney, near the City of London but then in Middlesex. The register entry reads "January 24 Godscall daughter of Theodore Paleologus of upp. Wapping Gent: and of Martha uxor. 12 days old".

She was the last recorded member of the Paleologus family, which claimed to be a branch of the medieval Palaiologos dynasty, rulers of the Byzantine Empire from 1259 to the fall of Constantinople in 1453. The Paleologus family claimed descent from Thomas Palaiologos, a brother of Constantine XI Palaiologos (the last emperor), through a son called John, whose existence can not be confirmed through contemporary sources. All other purported ancestors (descendants of this John) of the later Paleologus family can be verified through contemporary records, making their descent from the emperors plausible, but somewhat uncertain.

In The Traveller's Tree: A Journey Through the Caribbean Islands (1950), English historian Patrick Leigh Fermor wrote (on Godscall) that "this oddly-named little girl remains the last authentic descendant of the Paleologi" and in Byzantium: The Decline and Fall (1995), English popular historian John Julius Norwich identified Godscall as "the last known descendant of the Emperors of Byzantium". If her lineage is true, she could be considered the last true heir to the Roman imperial office.

Nothing is known of Godscall's life after her baptism, the last contemporary accounts being of her as a little girl in Wapping in 1694. It is not known whether she survived infancy, as no other records of her have been discovered. John Hall, author of a 2015 biography on Godscall's great-grandfather Theodore Paleologus, believes Godscall died soon after her baptism, perhaps within hours or days, but does not offer any evidence to support this theory beyond the fact that there are no known sources on her life beyond her baptism. Other authors, such as Fermor and Norwich, simply maintained that details on Godscall's further life were unknown.

== Name ==
Godscall's unusual name has been the subject of much speculation, with it typically being identified as "strange" or "eccentric". One possibility is that "Godscall" was a surname, perhaps derived from one of her mother's ancestors. Another explanation is that one or both of her parents were Puritans (though there is no evidence that they were), who in the 17th century often gave eccentric godly names to their children, such as Sorry for Sin or Fear the Lord. Hall suggests that the girl may have been sickly and that her mother feared for her imminent death, accepting that "God was calling her" and thus giving the child the name "Godscall".

Writing in 1977, the Greek historian Georgios Zoras believed that the name Godscall was an English equivalent of the Greek name Theocletiane (Θεοκλητιανή), which essentially means "God's call". More common female variants of this Greek name are Theoclete (Θεοκλήτη) and Theocleto (Θεοκλητώ) (the male variant is Theocletos [Θεόκλητος]).

== Legacy ==
With the only known surviving record of Godscall being her entry in the baptismal registers, her existence remained unknown for centuries. The record, and by extension Godscall herself, was not discovered until 1946 when researcher Cregoe Nicholson examined St Dunstan's registers in Stepney.

Tradition has it that during the Greek War of Independence (1821–1829), over a century after the Paleologus family disappeared from history, a delegation was sent by the Greek provisional government in Athens to find living descendants of the old imperial family. The delegation reportedly searched in vain for descendants in Cornwall and Barbados (where ancestors of Godscall were known to have lived). The delegation would have been unaware of any Paleologi in London due to Godscall's entry in the baptismal registers not yet having been discovered.

The Paleologus family have sometimes been featured in popular culture. Most of these appearances have to do with Theodore Paleologus of Cornwall (Godscall's great-grandfather by the same name as her father), and fictional descendants of him, though some tackle the family as a whole. Notably, the novel The Course of the Heart (1992) by science fiction and fantasy author M. John Harrison accords magic to the Paleologus family as imperial descendants. In the novel, Godscall is born in 1666 to a Constantine Paleologus of Barbados (not in 1694 to Theodore) and Harrison writes that this Godscall "carried in her bones the cup, the map, the mirror – the real heritage of the Empress and the real Clue to the Heart". In the novel, Godscall becomes an almost otherworldly "deathless empress" and a modern epileptic woman with visions is revealed to be either her descendant or her reincarnation.

In Jane Stevenson's novel Empress of the Last Days (2003), the hero of the book falls in love with a young black-skinned Barbadian girl by the name Melita Paleologue and they trace her lineage to the marriage between a daughter of King James VI & I, Elizabeth Stuart (called "the Winter Queen"), and a dark-skinned physician (Elizabeth Stuart was actually married to Frederick V of the Palatinate). In the book, Godscall's father dies a hero in battle at A Coruña, rather than as a privateer (as he did in real life), and his daughter Godscall marries a son of the Winter Queen. The historical delegation sent to Cornwall during the Greek War of Independence in search for descendants of the old imperial dynasty also appears in the novel, but is portrayed as discounting the proof presented by Godscall's descendants on account of their skin color. In reference to her depictions in popular culture, Hall referred to Godscall as rising "phoenix-like from the grave" and to her being "a deathless empress in another dimension".
