= Vomitoria =

Vomitoria may refer to:

- plural of vomitorium
- Holly species Ilex vomitoria
