= Theodorious Paleologus =

17th-century English sailor

Theodore Paleologus
- Born: c. 1660; Barbados
- Died: 1693 (aged c. 33); At sea, near Corunna, Spain
- Buried: Corunna, Spain
- Noble family: Paleologus
- Spouse: Martha Bradbury
- Issue: A son, dead before 1693; Godscall Paleologue
- Father: Ferdinand Paleologus
- Mother: Rebecca Pomfrett
- Occupation: Privateer

Theodore Paleologus (Italian: Teodoro Paleologo; c. 1660–1693), alternatively Theodorious or Theodorus and sometimes referred to as Theodore III by modern historians to distinguish him from his grandfather and his uncle, both by the same name, was the only known son of Ferdinand Paleologus. Through Ferdinand, Theodore, born in Barbados, may have been the last living male member of the Palaiologos dynasty, rulers of the Byzantine Empire from 1259 to its fall in 1453.

Theodore was a sailor and privateer on board the ship Charles II, captained by Charles Gibson. A year after Theodore's death, the ship's first mate Henry Every would take control of it and become a renowned pirate. Theodore lived in Stepney, Middlesex, on the River Thames, with his wife Martha Bradbury, from Barbados. He died in 1693 and was buried in Spain at Corunna. Martha was pregnant at the time of his death and he had a posthumous daughter, Godscall Paleologue, the last known living member of his family.

== Biography ==
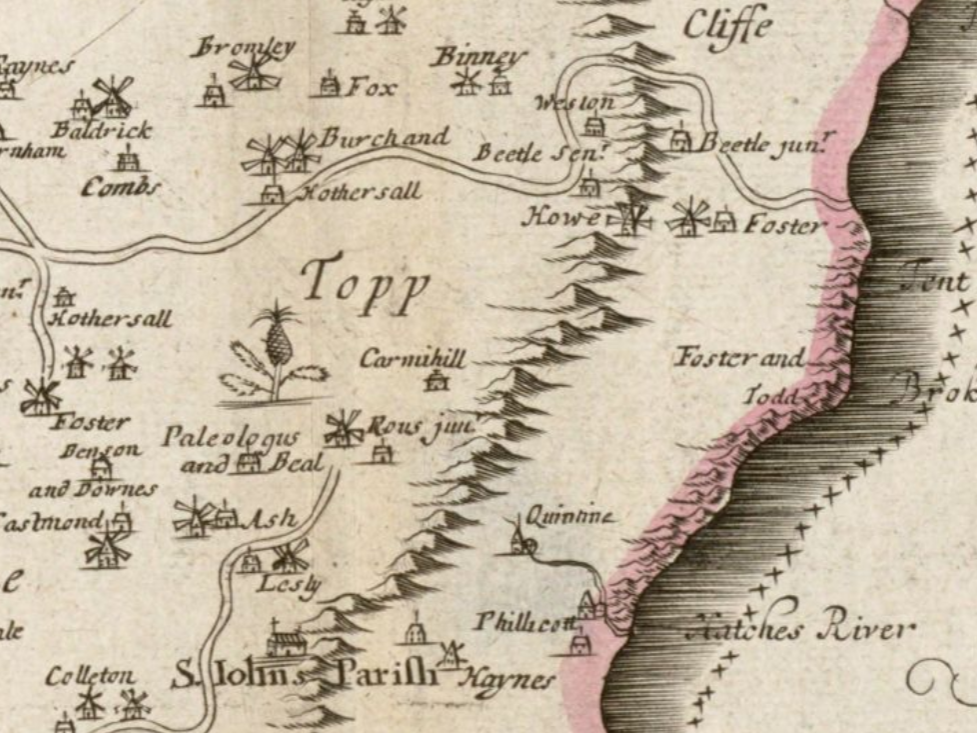
The "Paleologus and Beal" plantation on a 1685 map of Barbados, marked with a pineapple (to the left, below "Topp")

Theodorious, or Theodore, Paleologus was born c. 1660 as the only child of Ferdinand Paleologus and Rebecca Pomfrett, the daughter of a Barbadian landowner. In accordance with Greek naming customs, Theodore was named after his grandfather of the same name. As the son of Ferdinand Paleologus, Theodore might have been one of the last living descendants of the Palaiologos dynasty, rulers of the Byzantine Empire from 1259 to 1453. The family's lineage can be verified as true with the exception of an ancestor called John, purported to be the son of Thomas Palaiologos but absent in contemporary sources, making their descent from the emperors plausible, but somewhat uncertain. None of their contemporaries doubted their imperial descent.

Theodore is first attested in Ferdinand's will, dated 26 September 1670, wherein his name is spelled with the unusual spelling Theodorious. The will designated Theodore as the heir to half of Ferdinand's estate (the other half going to Rebecca), to be employed for his "maintenance and education, together with the increase of his Estate, until he attains the age of fourteen years".

Rebecca remarried at some point between the death of Ferdinand in October 1670 and July 1672, when the will of her brother (Theodore's uncle) Abraham Pomfrett refers to her as "Rebecca Beale". Her new husband was probably Captain Alexander Beale, recorded in the census papers of 1679 as the owner of 111 acres of land and 70 slaves. A 1685 map of Barbados identifies a plantation near St John's church as the "Paleologus and Beal" plantation. This indicates that Ferdinand's former plantation had been split by Theodore and his mother and that Theodore was now the business partner of Alexander Beale. On the map, the plantation is marked with a drawing of a pineapple, meaning that Theodore and Beale might have cultivated pineapples in addition to cultivating sugar. With her second husband, Rebecca had further children, half-siblings of Theodore, including a son also named Alexander Beale. She continued to be active in economic and political matters in Barbados for the rest of her life, together with her new husband, who seems to have taken over much of Ferdinand's role in the local church, becoming a churchwarden in 1677.

On 14 October 1684, Theodore married Martha Bradbury, the daughter of a Christopher Bradbury, in the St Michael's Church near Bridgetown. They eventually left Barbados, moving to Stepney, near the City of London. Theodore worked as a sailor, serving on a ship called the Charles II. Theodore made a will on 1 August 1693, appointing his wife, "Martha Paleologua" as his executor. The will was made at sea and was witnessed by the ship's commanding officer, Charles Gibson, and three others (presumably officers themselves). He died at sea that same year, off the coast of Spain, and was buried in the nearby city of Corunna shortly thereafter under the name Theodorus Palaeologey. The precise location of his grave is not known, but it is likely to be in the English Cemetery (Cemiterio Inglés).

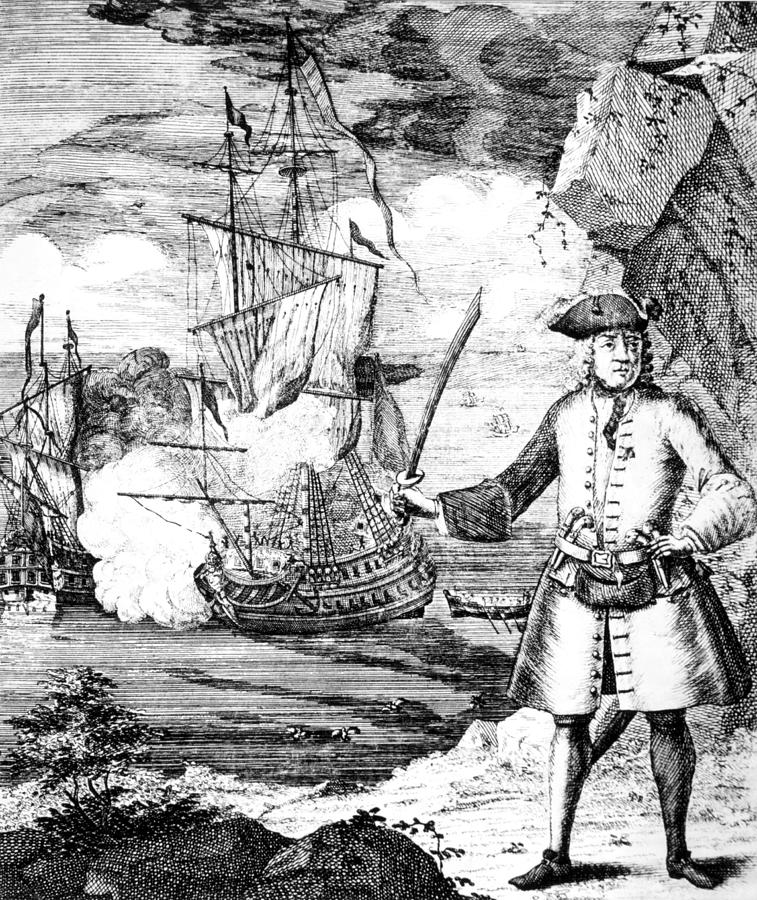
18th-century engraving of pirate captain Henry Every, with the Charles II (now renamed as the Fancy) depicted engaging in battle in the background.

Although a popular legend is that Theodore served in the Royal Navy, there are no records of his name, nor of the Charles II, nor of Charles Gibson, in Admiralty records. Some believe that he served on a slave ship, perhaps having learnt the trade of sailing during his background in the family plantation. There are however records of a ship called the Charles II and a Captain Gibson, which turned out to not be a slave ship at all, but a formidable armed warship in Spanish service. Theodore would thus probably have been a privateer, not a slaver. The first mate of the Charles II in Theodore's time was Henry Every, who just a year after Theodore's death would lead a mutiny and take control of the ship, renaming it to Fancy and becoming a renowned pirate.

Theodore and Martha had a daughter, born after her father's death, on 12 January 1694, and baptized on 24 January at St Dunstan's, Stepney. The parish register entry reads "January 24 Godscall daughter of Theodore Paleologus of upp. Wapping Gent: and of Martha uxor. 12 days old". Wapping was in the parish of Stepney, near the City of London, on the shore of the Pool of London.

Almost nothing is known of this daughter, who was given the unusual name Godscall Paleologue. Godscall was the last known living member of the Paleologus family. Theodore also had a son, born in Stepney, but this son probably predeceased him, since Theodore's will only mentions his wife. Theodore was the last known male member of his family.

== Legacy ==
Theodore is a central figure in a series of novels by British author Jane Stevenson. In The Pretender (2002), he is called Lieutenant Theodore Paleologue, son of "Sir Ferdinando", living in Restoration England. Instead of being a privateer, Theodore is a valiant officer in the Royal Navy and is described as having a short, pointy beard and an aquiline nose. In his first appearance, on the banks of the Thames, he exclaims to the passing-by lowlife that "If all had their rights, I should be emperor of the world". His parents are depicted as particularly lenient slave owners, and Theodore marries a native Kalina woman, not the historical Martha Bradbury.

In Stevenson's Empress of the Last Days (2003), set in the early 21st century, the hero of the book falls in love with a young black-skinned Barbadian girl by the name Melita Paleologue and they trace her lineage to the marriage between a daughter of King James VI & I, Elizabeth Stuart (called "the Winter Queen"), and a dark-skinned physician; Elizabeth Stuart was actually married to Frederick V of the Palatinate. In the novel, Theodore dies a hero in battle near Corunna, rather than as a privateer, and his daughter Godscall marries a son of the Winter Queen. A historical delegation sent to Cornwall during the Greek War of Independence in the 19th century in search for descendants of the old imperial dynasty also appears in the novel, but is portrayed as discounting the proof presented by Godscall's descendants on account of their skin color.
