= Vomitory =

Vomitory may refer to:

- Vomitorium, an architectural feature in Ancient Roman amphitheatres
- Vomitory (band), a death metal band from Sweden
