= Coffin birth =

Expulsion of fetus from the body of a dead pregnant woman

Coffin birth, also known as postmortem fetal extrusion, is the expulsion of a nonviable fetus through the vaginal opening of the decomposing body of a deceased pregnant woman due to increasing pressure from intra-abdominal gases. This kind of postmortem delivery occurs very rarely during the decomposition of a body. The practice of chemical preservation, whereby chemical preservatives and disinfectant solutions are pumped into a body to replace natural body fluids (and the bacteria that reside therein), have made the occurrence of "coffin birth" so rare that the topic is rarely mentioned in international medical discourse.

Typically during the decomposition of a human body, naturally occurring bacteria in the organs of the abdominal cavity (such as the stomach and intestines) generate gases as by-products of metabolism, which causes the body to swell. In some cases, the confined pressure of the gases can squeeze the uterus (the womb), even forcing it downward, and it may turn inside-out and be forced out of the body through the vaginal opening (a process called prolapse). If a fetus is contained within the uterus, it could therefore be expelled from the mother's body through the vaginal opening when the uterus turns inside-out, in a process that, to outward appearances, mimics childbirth. The main differences lie in the state of the mother and fetus and the mechanism of delivery: in the event of natural, live childbirth, the mother's contractions thin and widen the cervix to expel the infant from the womb; in a case of coffin birth, built-up gas pressure within the putrefied body of a pregnant woman pushes the dead fetus from the body of the mother.

Cases have been recorded by medical authorities since the 16th century, though some archaeological cases provide evidence for its occurrence in many periods of human history. While cases of postmortem fetal expulsion have always been rare, the phenomenon has been recorded under disparate circumstances and is occasionally seen in a modern forensic context when the body of a pregnant woman lies undisturbed and undiscovered for some time following death. There are also cases whereby a fetus may become separated from the body of the pregnant woman about the time of death or during decomposition, though because those cases are not consistent with the processes described here, they are not considered true cases of postmortem fetal extrusion.

== Causes ==
The cause of postmortem fetal extrusion is not completely understood, as the event is neither predictable nor replicable under experimental conditions. Evidence has accumulated opportunistically and direct observation is serendipitous. While it is possible that more than one cause can produce the same result, there is an accepted hypothesis, based on established research in the fields of biochemistry and forensic taphonomy, (Note: Forensic taphonomy is the study of the processes of decomposition.) and further supported by observational research, that accounts for the taphonomic mechanisms that would result in the most often encountered cases of postmortem extrusion of a non-viable fetus.

Typically, as a dead body decomposes, body tissues become depleted of oxygen and the body begins to putrefy; anaerobic bacteria in the gastrointestinal tract proliferate and as a result of increased metabolic activity, release gases such as carbon dioxide, methane, and hydrogen sulfide. These bacteria secrete exoenzymes to break down body cells and proteins for ingestion which thus weakens organ tissues. Increasing pressure forces the diffusion of excessive gases into the weakened tissues where they enter the circulatory system and spread to other parts of the body, causing both torso and limbs to become bloated. These decompositional processes weaken the structural integrity of organs by separating necrotizing tissue layers. Bloating usually begins from two to five days after death, depending on external temperature, humidity, and other environmental conditions. As the volume of gas increases, the pressure begins to force various body fluids to exude from all natural orifices. It is at this point during the decomposition of a pregnant body that amniotic membranes become stretched and separated, and intra-abdominal gas pressure may force the eversion and prolapse of the uterus, (Note: That is, the uterus could be forced partially or completely inside-out (eversion), and fall or be forced out of the vaginal opening (prolapse).) which would result in the expulsion of the fetus through the vaginal canal. It has been observed that the bodies of multiparous women (Note: Multiparous women are those who have experienced vaginal childbirth two or more times.) are more likely to spontaneously expel the fetus during decomposition than those who died during their first pregnancy, because of the more elastic nature of the cervix.

== History ==
Numerous documented cases of postmortem fetal extrusion were described in the medical compendium Anomalies and Curiosities of Medicine, first published in 1896. The earliest presented case occurred in 1551 when a pregnant woman was tried and hanged by the courts of the Spanish Inquisition. Four hours after her death, and while the body still hung by the neck, two dead infants were seen to fall free of the body. This is unusual for the short amount of time elapsed between death and the postmortem delivery. As no information is given regarding other ambient circumstances, it is unclear whether the onset of putrefaction was accelerated, or if other causal factors were at work. In the city of Brussels, in 1633, a woman died in convulsions and three days later a fetus was spontaneously expelled. In Weissenfels, in 1861, postmortem fetal extrusion was observed sixty hours after the death of a pregnant woman. Other cases are described, though only a few describe the unexpected discovery of fetal remains following exhumation. Most cases occurred before burial; in some of these, the body was in the casket while in other cases the body was still on its deathbed or on a bier.

During the late 19th century, modern embalming techniques were developed, whereby preservative and disinfectant chemical compounds (such as formaldehyde) are pumped into a body, flushing out the body's natural fluids, and with them the bacteria that flourish during putrefaction and generate the gases that comprise the active force behind the expulsion of the fetus. However, the phenomenon was still recognized by medical science and in 1904, John Whitridge Williams wrote a textbook on obstetric medicine that included a section on "coffin birth". Although the text has remained an important reference in obstetrics, the subject, whether called "coffin birth" or "postmortem fetal extrusion", was excluded by its 13th edition in 1966, and was not mentioned in the edition published in 2009. The subject was discussed in German medical literature during the 20th century, though more detailed case reports in the forensic literature have been published recently.

In 2005, the body of a 34-year-old woman, eight months pregnant, was discovered in her apartment in Hamburg, Germany. The body was bloated and discolored, and upon initial examination, it was found that the head of the fetus had made its appearance in the vaginal opening. At autopsy, medical examiners found that both the head and shoulders of the fetus had emerged, and concluded that it was a case of postmortem fetal extrusion in progress. The woman, who had given birth twice before, had died of a heroin overdose. The case was unusual and serendipitous, as it was the first modern case in which medical practitioners were able to document a case of postmortem fetal extrusion in progress.

In 2008, the body of a 38-year-old woman, seven months pregnant, was discovered in an open field four days after she had disappeared from her residence in Panama. A plastic bag had been left over her head, and she had been gagged; the case was ruled a homicide. The body had suffered from the tropical heat and high humidity, and was bloated and highly discolored. At autopsy, the remains of the fetus were discovered in the woman's undergarments. Although the fetus was in a similar state of decomposition, the umbilical cord was intact and still attached to the placenta inside the uterus. This was the first forensic case in which it could be concluded that coffin birth had occurred based on the position of the bodies and the clear attachment of the umbilical cord to the un-expelled placenta.

In 2019, the autopsy reports in the case of the Watts family homicides in August 2018 revealed that Shanann Watts (who had been 15 weeks pregnant at the time of her murder) had been found in a shallow grave and that the fetus had been expelled from her body, along with the placenta and umbilical cord.

=== Bioarchaeology ===
Postmortem fetal extrusion can be very difficult to recognize once a body has undergone complete skeletonization, and bioarchaeologists are often very cautious about asserting the presence of this phenomenon. There are numerous cultural reasons why a mother and an infant might be interred together, so the joint presence of neonatal remains and an adult female is not taken as conclusive evidence of postmortem fetal extrusion; however, there have been excavated burials where the position of a set of fetal remains relative to those of an adult female supported this hypothesis. There are a few general guidelines when an archaeologist is assessing the placement of the fetus and the adult:

1. If the fetal remains are found in a fetal position and are wholly within the pelvic cavity of the adult, the fetus died and was interred before delivery. The pregnant woman may therefore have died due to labor complications.
2. If the infant is found alongside the adult, with the head oriented in the same direction as the adult, then the infant was delivered, whether naturally or by caesarian incision, around the time of death, and thereafter interred.
  1. Delivered infants have also been interred between or alongside the tibiae (shins), but the infant is still oriented in the same direction as the adult.
  2. If the majority of the fetal remains are in the pelvic cavity of the adult, yet the legs are extended and/or the cranium lies among the ribs, then the infant may have been delivered and then placed on top of the mother's torso before burial. As both bodies skeletonized, the infant's bones would have settled among the mother's ribs and vertebrae.
3. If the fetal remains are complete and in a position inferior to and in-line with the pelvic outlet, with the head oriented opposite to that of the mother (toward the foot of the coffin or grave), then there is the possibility of coffin birth.
  1. Evidence for postmortem fetal extrusion may be less ambiguous when the fetal remains are found to lie within the pelvic outlet of the adult, thus indicating that partial extrusion had occurred during decomposition.

In 1975, it was reported that during the excavation of a medieval cemetery in Kings Worthy, England, fetal remains appeared to lie within the birth canal of the skeleton of a young woman, with the fetal cranium external to the pelvic outlet and between the two femora (thigh bones) and the fetal leg bones clearly within the pelvic cavity. Other cases of coffin birth at archaeological sites have been described, such as in 1978 at a Neolithic site in Germany, at a medieval site in Denmark in 1982, and in 2009 at an Early Christian period site at Fingal, Ireland. A coffin birth was also described in a 2011 episode of the BBC show History Cold Case, featuring the Roman era remains of a woman and three neonates discovered near Baldock, Hertfordshire. Another was identified in 2006 in a 14th-century Black Death cemetery in Genoa, Italy.

== Applicability of diagnosis ==
Because postmortem fetal extrusion is so rare, and occurs under highly idiosyncratic conditions regarding the individual and the ambient environment, this phenomenon has not been studied for possible applications to forensic investigation. Even if the study of postmortem fetal extrusion could lead to improved investigative methods, experimental research would be highly problematic. At present, forensic scientists have at their disposal an array of established techniques and procedures for a death investigation at the stages of decomposition when postmortem fetal extrusion typically occurs.

In archaeology, the study of mortuary context, that is, the interpretation of the postmortem treatment of the dead, whether an individual or as pertains to patterns within a group, has led to the development of hypotheses on social status and/or hierarchy regarding many cultures, ancient and extant. In addition, the determination of whether or not delivery actually occurred before death has a bearing on analyses of the mother's population, as the concentration of trace elements differ markedly between the skeletons of prepartum adult women (before giving birth) and women who are lactating; the identification of coffin birth would lead to more accurate analyses of the number of lactating women in a population or the rate of maternal mortality. It is therefore necessary for investigators to be able to recognize postmortem fetal extrusion when encountered in an excavated burial.

== Comparable phenomena ==
There are also many cases where the remains of the fetus are found separate from the body of the mother, but expulsion was not through the birth canal, and separation of the two bodies may have been influenced by external environmental factors. The process of separation is so unusual that a specific term for the phenomenon may not have been proposed to the scientific community. These cases may have comparable results, but they are not cases of postmortem fetal extrusion.

In April 2003, the body of Laci Peterson washed up on a shore near San Francisco Bay; she had been pregnant when she disappeared four months earlier, and the fetus she had been carrying was discovered on a separate beach. When questioned by the media, medical authorities initially speculated that a "coffin birth" might have occurred. However, at autopsy the cervix was found to be in a prepartum condition. Medical examiners later concluded that while Peterson's body was in the bay, the skin over the abdominal cavity had ruptured due to natural decompositional processes. Seawater entered the abdominal cavity and washed out most of the internal organs, along with the fetus.

In 2007, a 23-year-old woman in India, over eight months pregnant, hanged herself after contractions had begun. A viable infant was spontaneously delivered unassisted from the woman's body, which was suspended by the neck. The healthy infant was found on the floor, still tethered to the body of the mother by the umbilical cord. The primary cause of the delivery was the otherwise normal contractions, which had begun before death, and was therefore not related to processes of decomposition. While this is not postmortem fetal extrusion, it may be referred to as a case of postmortem delivery, a term which is applied to a broad range of techniques and phenomena with a resultant delivery of a live infant.

In 2008, in Germany, a 23-year-old woman in her third trimester was involved in a motor vehicle accident and died; the non-viable fetus was found between her feet. The vehicle caught fire following initial impact. The woman died of blunt trauma, and her body burned in the car. Investigators came to the conclusion that the extreme heat of the fire burned away epidermal and subcutaneous tissue around the abdominal cavity, after which the anterior aspect of the uterus ruptured, causing the fetus to spill out of the uterine cavity and land on the floor between the woman's feet. The umbilical cord was still intact and connected the fetus to the placenta through the ruptured wall of the uterus. Unlike the woman, who suffered fourth-degree burns over her entire body, the body of the fetus was relatively undamaged. Because the primary cause of separation from the mother's body was thermally induced traumatic rupture of the abdominal and uterine cavities; traumatic separation was not related to normal decompositional processes; and expulsion of the fetus did not involve passage through the birth canal, this is not considered a case of postmortem fetal extrusion.

== In animals ==
Whales can be subject to postmortem fetal extrusion. Many species float when dead, due to the gases of putrefaction. Drift whales that wash up on shore, and the carcasses of hunted whales, if not flensed (stripped of blubber) and processed in a timely manner, pose a risk. Tim Flannery wrote that "A rotting whale could fill with gas to bursting, ejecting a fetus the size of a motor vehicle with sufficient force to kill a man."

== See also ==
- Osteology
- Posthumous birth
- Stillbirth

== Bibliography ==
- Behera C; Rantji R; Dogra TD (2007). "Full term normal delivery following suicidal hanging". Forensic Science International. 169 (1): e1–e2. doi:10.1016/j.forsciint.2007.01.018. PMID 17324544.
- Bell, Edward (1992). "The Historical Archeology of Mortuary Behavior: Coffin Hardware from Uxbridge, Massachusetts" (PDF). University of Florida. Archived from the original (PDF) on 12 March 2012.
- Carter, DO; Tibbett, M. (2008). "Cadaver Decomposition and Soil: Processes". In Tibbett, M.; Carter, D.O. (eds.). Soil Analysis in Forensic Taphonomy. New York: CRC Press. pp. 29–51. ISBN 9781420069914.
- Carter, DO; Yellowlees, D; Tibbett, M (2007). "Cadaver decomposition in terrestrial ecosystems". Naturwissenschaften. 94 (1): 12–24. Bibcode:2007NW.....94...12C. doi:10.1007/s00114-006-0159-1. PMID 17091303. S2CID 13518728.
- Cesana, D.; Benedictow, O.J.; Bianucci, R. (2017). "The origin and early spread of the Black Death in Italy: first evidence of plague victims from 14th-century Liguria (northern Italy)". Anthropological Science. 125: 15–24. doi:10.1537/ase.161011.
- Cunningham F; Leveno K; Bloom S; Hauth J; Rouse D; Spong C. (2009). Williams Obstetrics (23 ed.). New York: McGraw-Hill Medical.
- Dinn, Peter (1999). Embalming. Weston, Australia: Toscan Dinn Funerals.
- Eastman, Nicholson J.; Hellman, Louis M. Eastman (1966). Williams Obstetrics (13 ed.). New York: Appleton-Century-Crofts, Inc.
- Fleeman, M. (2003). Laci: Inside the Laci Peterson Murder. New York: St. Martin's Press. ISBN 0-312-99585-7.
- Galloway, A. (1997). "The Process of Decomposition: A Model from the Arizona-Sonoran Desert". In Haglund, WD; Sorg, MH (eds.). Forensic Taphonomy: The Postmortem Fate of Human Remains. New York: CRC Press. pp. 139–150.
- Gill-King, H (1997). "Chemical and Ultrastructural Aspects of Decomposition". In Haglund, WD; Sorg, MH (eds.). Forensic Taphonomy: The Postmortem Fate of Human Remains. New York: CRC Press. pp. 93–108.
- Gould, George M.; Pyle, Walter L. (1997). "Obstetric Anomalies". Anomalies and Curiosities of Medicine. Seattle: The World Wide School. ISBN 0-585-00884-1. Archived from the original on 28 February 2008.
- Hawkes S.; Wells C. (1975). "An Anglo-Saxon obstetric calamity from Kingsworthy, Hampshire". Medical and Biological Illustration. 25 (1): 47–51. PMID 1100936.
- Jungmichel G.; Musick N. (1941). "Über Sarggeburt" [About Coffin Birth]. Deutsche Zeitschrift für die Gesamte Gerichtliche Medizin (in German). 34 (1–3): 236–56. doi:10.1007/bf01793810. S2CID 30026918.
- Kaiser, G. (1978). "Prähistorischen sarggeburt" [A Prehistoric Coffin Birth]. Beiträge zur Gerichtlichen Medizin (in German). 36: 197–201. PMID 718611.
- Larsen, Clark Spencer (1999). Bioarchaeology: Interpreting Behavior from the Human Skeleton. Cambridge, UK: Cambridge University Press. ISBN 0-521-65834-9.
- Lasso E; Santos M; Rico A; Pachar JV; Lucena J (2009). "Expulsión Fetal Postmortem". Cuadernos de Medicina Forense (in Spanish). 15: 77–81.
- Lewis, Mary E. (2007). The Bioarchaeology of Children: Perspectives from Biological and Forensic Anthropology. New York: Cambridge University Press. pp. 34–37, 91. ISBN 978-0-521-83602-9.
- Lopez-Zeno JA; Carlo WA; O'Grady JP; Fanaroff AA (1990). "Infant Survival Following Delayed Postmortem Cesarean Delivery". Obstetrics and Gynecology. 76 (5 Pt 2): 991–992. doi:10.1097/00006250-199011001-00038. PMID 2216275.
- Møller-Christensen, V. (1982), Aebelholt Kloster [Aebelholt Monastery] (in Danish), Copenhagen: Nationalmuseet
- O'Donovan, Edmond; Geber, Jonny; Baker, Christine (2009). "Archaeological excavations on Mount Gamble Hill: stories from the first Christians in Swords". Axes, Warriors and Windmills: Recent archaeological discoveries in North Fingal. Fingal County Council. ISBN 978-0-9549103-9-6.
- Ortner, DJ (2003). Identification of Pathological Conditions in Human Skeletal Remains (2 ed.). San Diego: Academic Press.
- Panning G. (1941). "Sarggeburt" [Coffin Birth]. Deutsche Zeitschrift für die Gesamte Gerichtliche Medizin (in German). 34 (1–3): 257–64. doi:10.1007/bf01793811. S2CID 264011469.
- Prokop O.; Göhler W. (1976). Forensische Medizin [Forensic Medicine] (in German) (3 ed.). Stuttgart, Germany: Gustav Fischer.
- Robb, John; Bigazzi, Renzo; Lazzarini, Luca; Scarsini, Caterina; Sonego, Fiorenza (2001). "Social status and biological status: A comparison of grave goods and skeletal indicators from Pontecagnano". American Journal of Physical Anthropology. 115 (3): 213–222. doi:10.1002/ajpa.1076. PMID 11424073.
- Saukko, PJ; Knight, B. (2004). Knight's Forensic Pathology (3 ed.). London: Hodder Arnold. ISBN 0-340-76044-3.
- Schulz, F; Püschel, K; Tsokos, M. (2005). "Postmortem fetal extrusion in a case of maternal heroin intoxication". Forensic Science, Medicine, and Pathology. 1 (4): 273–6. doi:10.1385/FSMP:1:4:273. PMID 25868446. S2CID 4276138.
- Solecki, Ralph S. (November 1975). "Shanidar IV, a Neanderthal Flower Burial in Northern Iraq". Science. 190 (4217): 880–881. Bibcode:1975Sci...190..880S. doi:10.1126/science.190.4217.880. S2CID 71625677.
- Strauch (1921). "Über Sarggeburt" [About Coffin Birth]. Zentralbl Gynäkol (in German). 23: 828–829.
- Ubelaker, Douglas H. (1997). "Taphonomic Applications in Forensic Anthropology". In William D. Haglund; Marcella H. Sorg (eds.). Forensic Taphonomy: The Postmortem Fate of Human Remains. Boca Raton, FL: CRC Press. pp. 77–90. ISBN 0-8493-9434-1.
- USA Today (15 April 2003). "Theories on How Dead Woman Could Deliver Baby". USA Today. p. A-4.
- Vennemann B; Bohnert M; Pollak S; Perdekamp MG (2008). "Postmortem "delivery" in a pregnant fire victim". International Journal of Legal Medicine. 122 (4): 327–331. doi:10.1007/s00414-008-0234-6. PMID 18504598. S2CID 21934004.
- Wells, C. (1975). "Ancient Obstetric Hazards and Female Mortality". Bulletin of the New York Academy of Medicine. 51 (11): 1235–1249. PMC 1749741. PMID 1101997.
- Williams, John Whitridge (1904). Obstetrics: A Text-book for the Use of Students and Practitioners. New York: D. Appleton and Company. ISBN 0-8385-7199-9.
