= Stina Piper =

Swedish countess

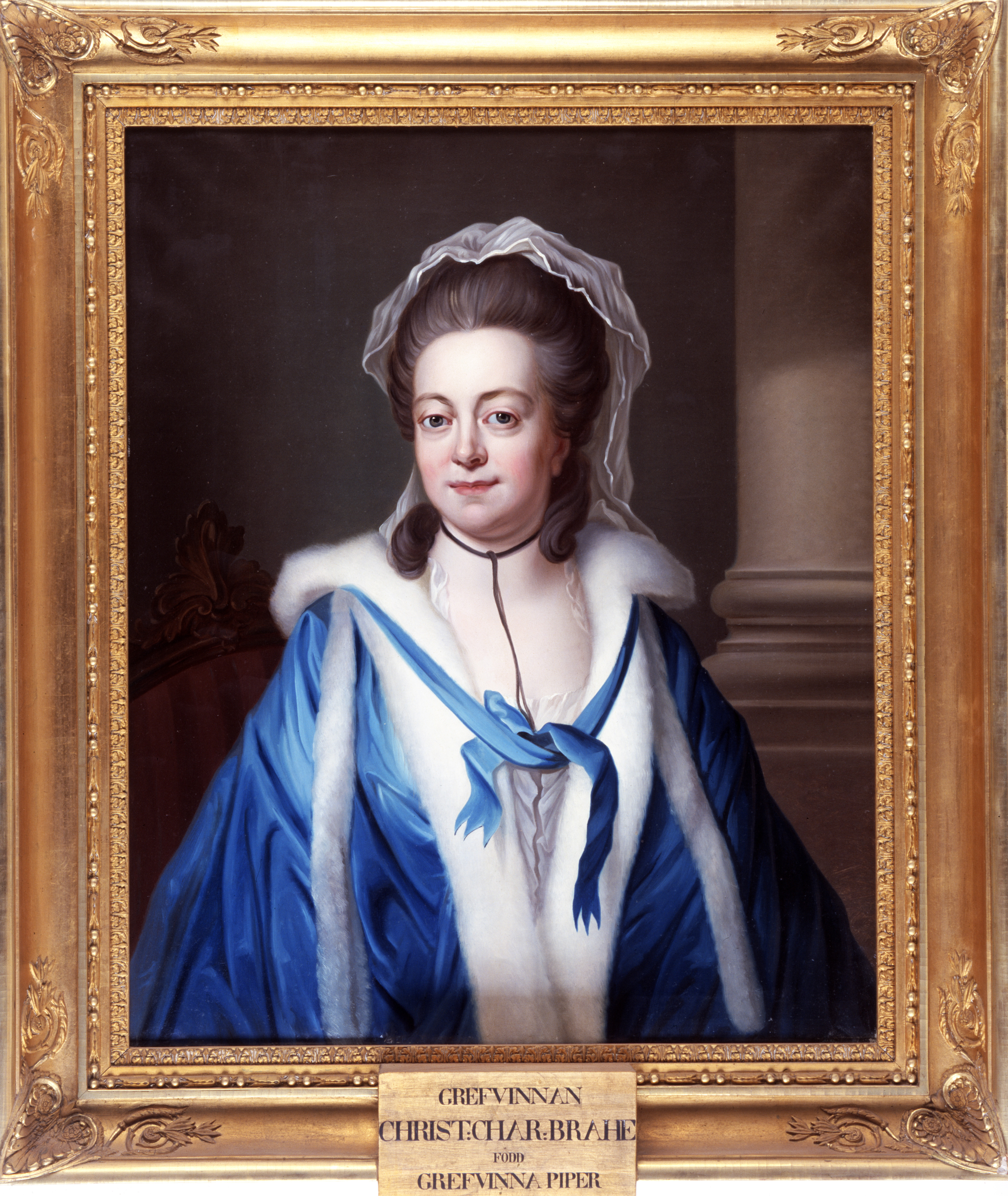
Stina Piper in a portrait.

Christina "Stina" Charlotta Piper (17 January 1734 – 1800) was a Swedish estate manager and countess.

She was the daughter of Carl Fredrik Piper and Ulrika Christina Mörner af Morlanda. She was the granddaughter of Christina Piper. In 1754 she married Erik Brahe, who was executed in 1756 for participating in the queen's failed Coup of 1756. Piper, who was pregnant at the time of her husband's execution, tried several times to get a more lenient sentence for her husband.

Piper had two children with Brahe: Ulrika Juliana and Magnus Fredrik Brahe. As a widow, Piper successfully managed the estates belonging to her son and step-sons' inheritance during their minority. During her years as a widow, she had a relationship with her cousin Carl Ribbing, with whom she had three children between 1762 and 1769 who were raised in foster homes.

In 1773, she married riksråd Ulrik Scheffer, a political opponent of Erik Brahe. As the wife of riksråd Scheffer, Piper was given the title riksrådinna and as such had a role in the Swedish royal court's etiquette and ceremonial activities.

In 1783, the couple retired back to the Stora Ek estate Scheffer died in 1799, after which Stina Piper returned to Stockholm where she died a year later.
