= Olof Arenius =

Swedish portrait painter (1701–1766)

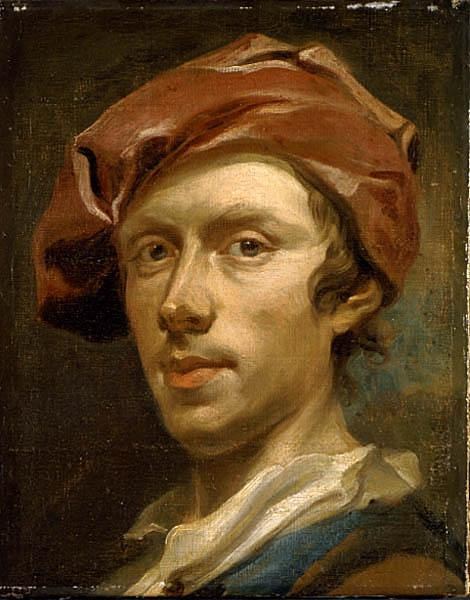
Self-portrait, now in the Nationalmuseum

Olof Arenius (16 December 1701 – 5 May 1766) was a Swedish portrait painter. Arenius studied under painter David von Krafft, and in 1736, he was named court painter by King Frederick I.

== Biography ==
Arenius was born in the parish of Bro in Uppland, Sweden. His father was a vicar in Upplands-Bro. After a period of theology studies at Uppsala University, he studied art under David von Krafft (1655–1724). In 1729, he went to the United Kingdom where he was exposed to the art of portrait painters Godfried Kneller (1646–1723) and Mikael Dahl (1659–1743).

Returning to Sweden in 1736, he was named court painter by King Frederick I of Sweden. He died at Stockholm in 1766. His portraits and miniatures in oil are much esteemed, and are to be found in all the public galleries, as well as in the best private collections, in Sweden. Many of them have been engraved.

== Gallery ==
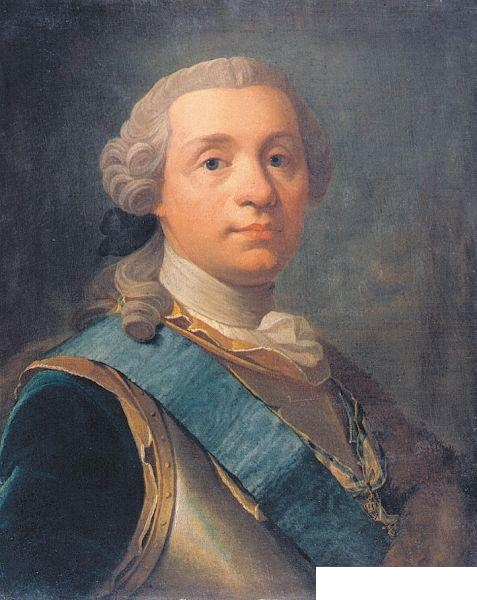
Portrait of Augustin Ehrensvärd

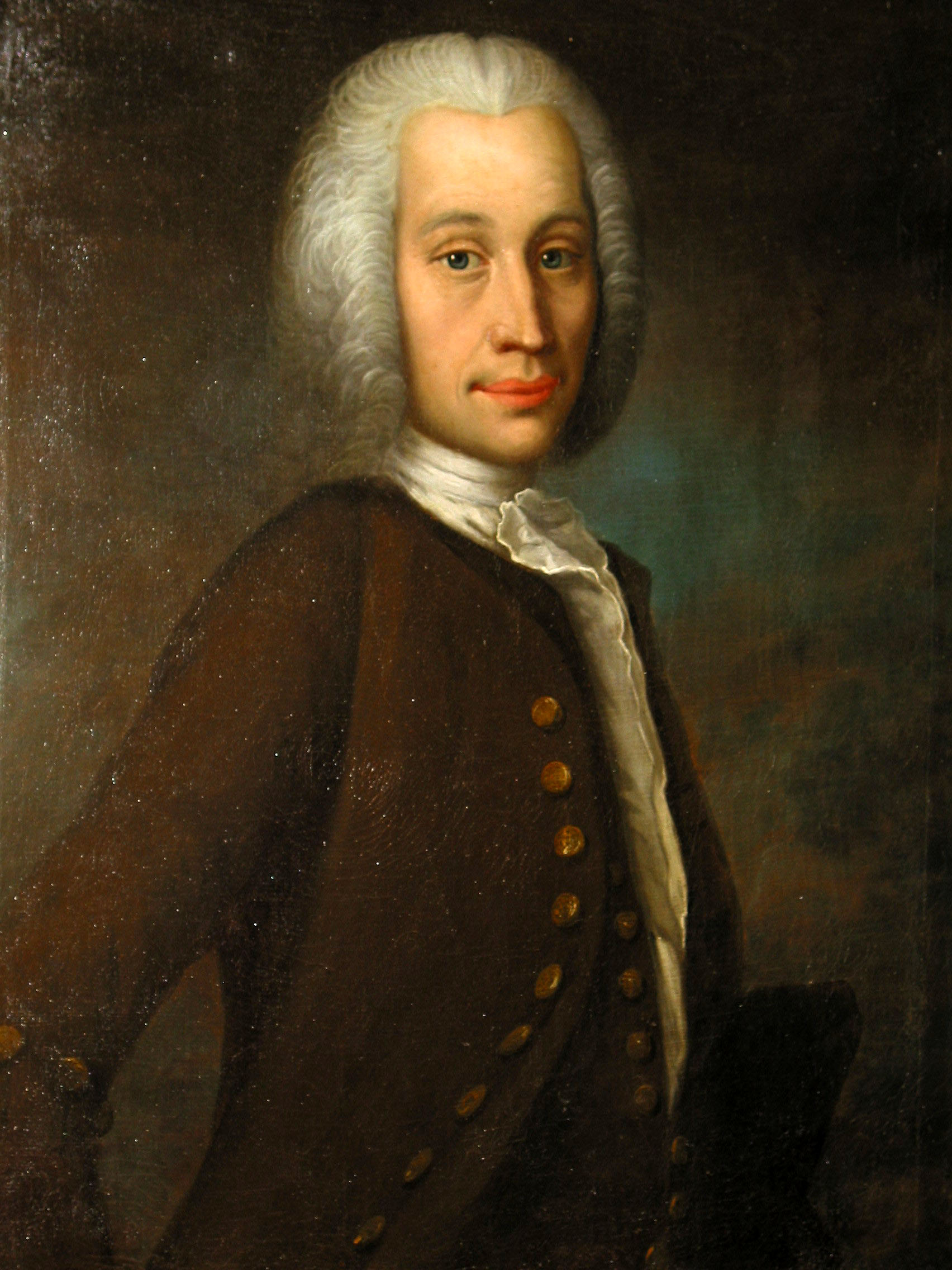
Portrait of Anders Celsius

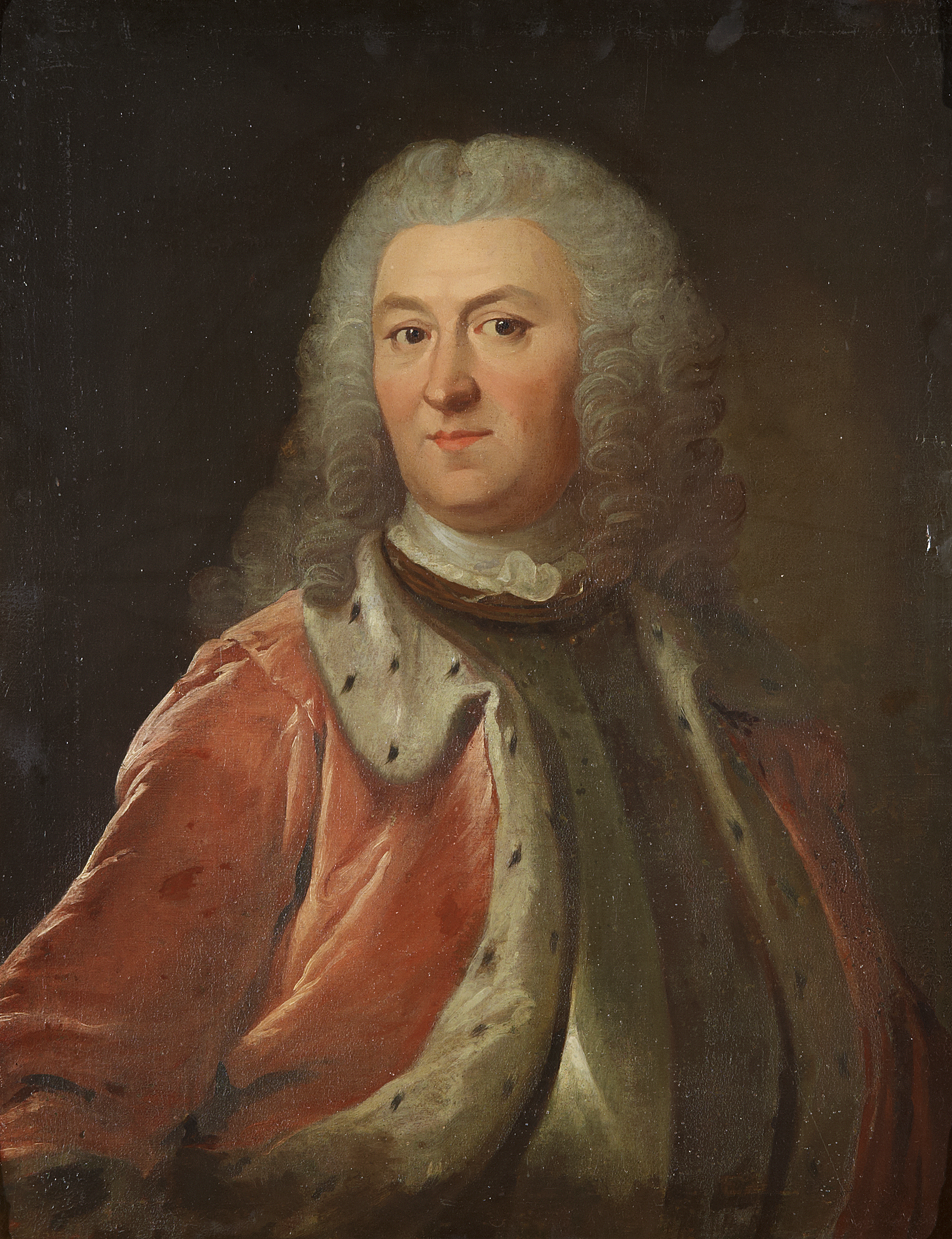
Portrait of Axel Löwen

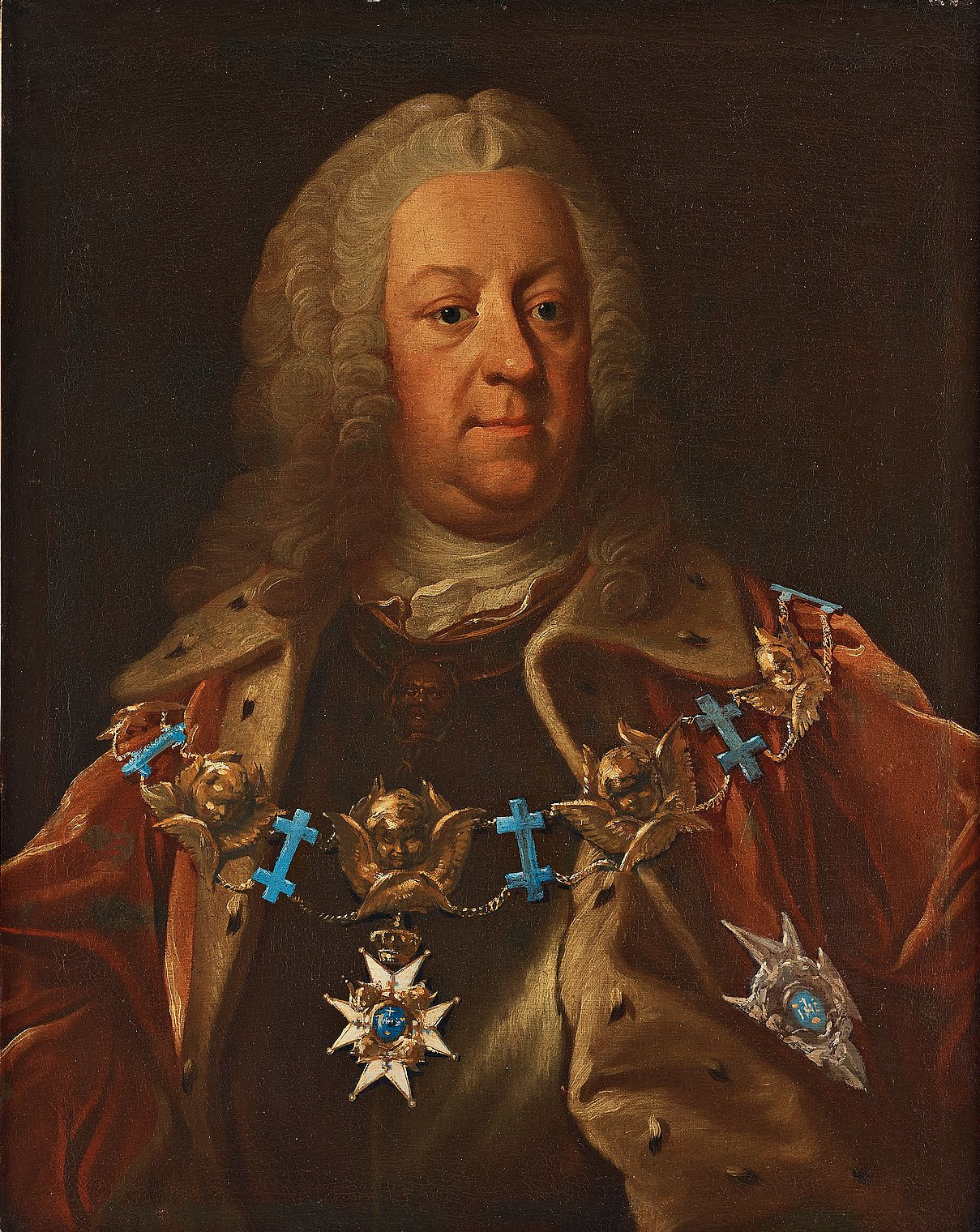
Portrait of Arvid Posse

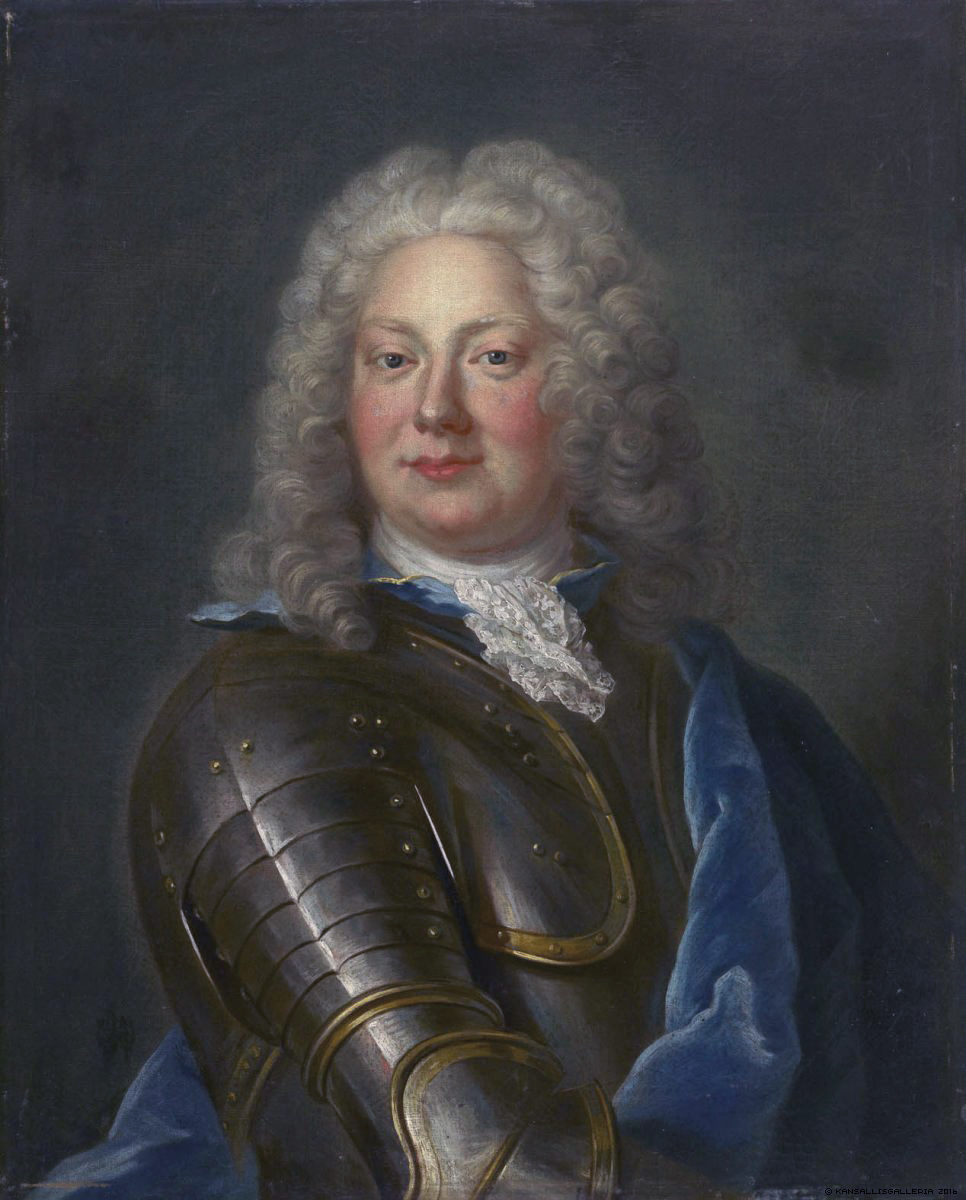
Portrait of Gustaf Jacob Horn
