= Magnus Stålsvärd =

Swedish officer

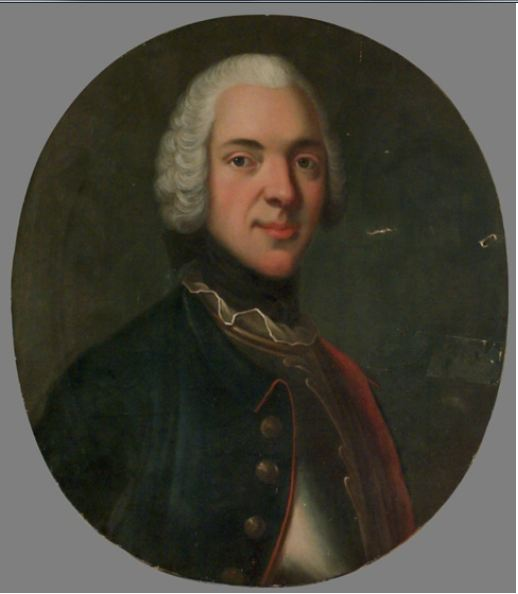
Portrait of Magnus Stålsvärd

Magnus Stålsvärd (1724–1756), was a Swedish officer. He was executed for treason as one of the conspirators participating in the failed coup d'etat of queen Louisa Ulrika, the Coup of 1756.
