= Gustaf Jacob Horn =

Swedish baron

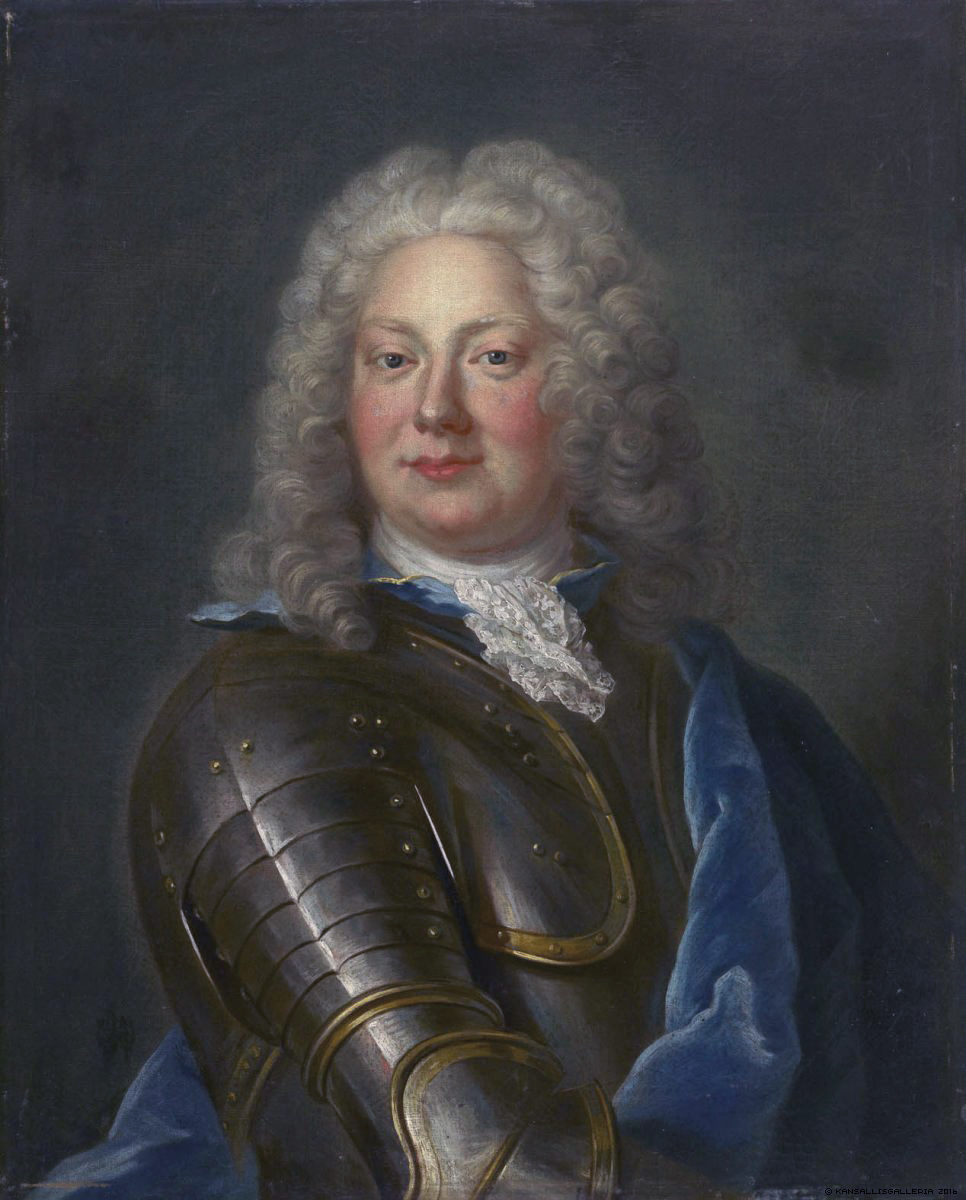
Lord Chamberlain Gustaf Jakob Horn af Rantzien (Olof Arenius)

Gustaf Jacob Horn af Rantzien (1706–1756) was a Swedish baron. He was executed for treason as one of the conspirators participating in the failed coup d'etat of queen Louisa Ulrika, the Coup of 1756.

== Sources ==
- Gustaf Jacob Horn i Svenskt biografiskt lexikon (artikel av Olof Jägerskiöld)
