= Johan Puke =

Swedish officer

Johan Puke (October 20, 1726, Klinte, Gotland – July 23,1756), was a Swedish officer. He was executed for treason as one of the conspirators participating in the failed coup d'etat of queen Louisa Ulrika, the Coup of 1756.

In 1744 he became a Sargent in the artillery.

Johan Puke was the father of Johan af Puke, a Swedish naval officer who participated in the Russo-Swedish War (1788–1790).
