= Barf =

Barf may refer to:

- Slang for vomit
- Barf (album), a 2000 album by Farhad Mehrad
- Barf (Lake District), a hill in Cumbria, England
- Bay Area Renters Federation, a political advocacy group in San Francisco
- Bone and raw food diet, bones and raw food diet for pets
- Tetrakis[3,5-bis(trifluoromethyl)phenyl]borate, commonly abbreviated as [BAr^{F}_{4}]^{−} and nicknamed BARF
- Barf, a character in the 1987 movie Spaceballs and Spaceballs: The Animated Series
- Barf and Belch, a two headed dragon in How to Train Your Dragon

== See also ==
- Barff Peninsula, South Georgia Island
- Barfe
