= Vomitorium =

Passage in a theatre allowing crowds to exit

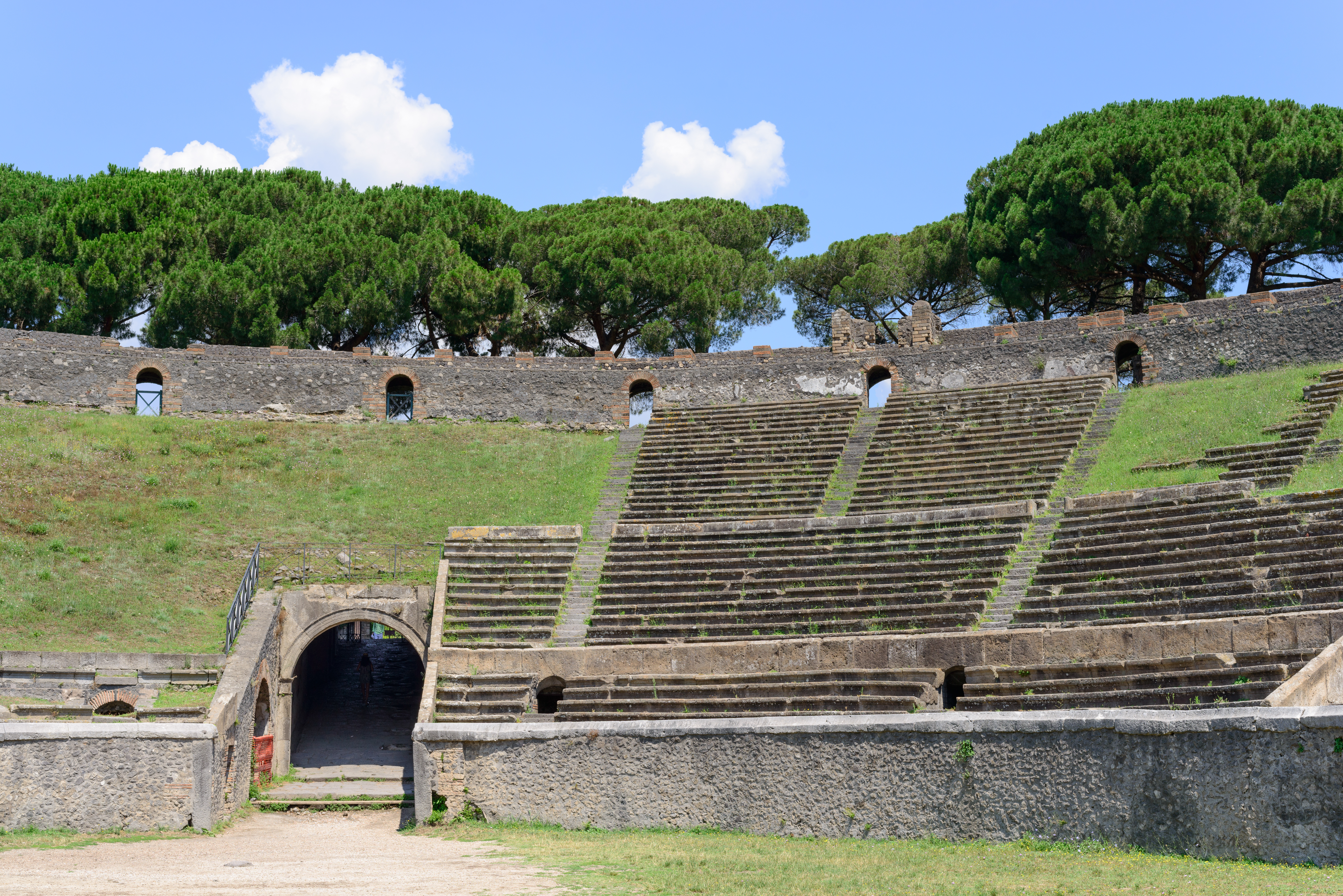
Vomitorium at the Amphitheatre of Pompeii in Pompeii

A vomitorium is a passage situated below or behind a tier of seats in an amphitheatre or a stadium through which large crowds can exit rapidly at the end of an event. They can also be pathways for actors to enter and leave stage. The Latin word vomitorium, plural vomitoria, derives from the verb vomō, vomere, "to spew forth". In ancient Roman architecture, vomitoria were designed to provide rapid egress for large crowds at amphitheatres and stadia, as they do in modern sports stadia and large theatres.

== Modern examples ==
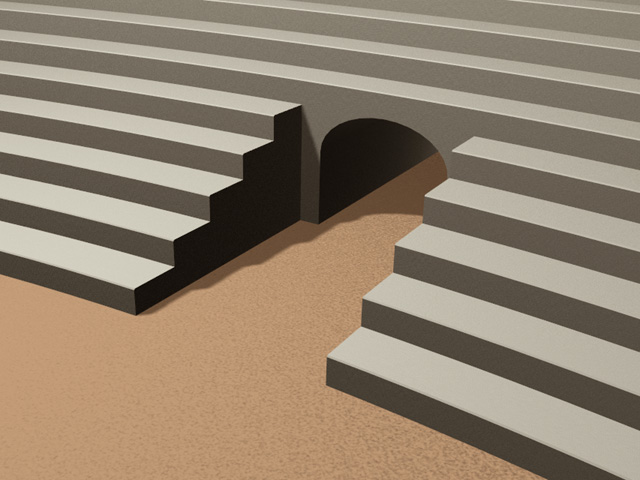
Rendering of a vomitorium

Smock Alley Theatre in Temple Bar, Dublin, has two vomitoria, one stage left and one stage right, as does the Stratford Festival in Stratford, Ontario, Canada. The Oregon Shakespeare Festival, for instance, has vomitoria in two of its theatres, the outdoor Elizabethan Stage and the Angus Bowmer Theatre. The "voms", as they are called, allow actors to mount the stage from halls cut into the amphitheatre. The Guthrie Theatre in Minneapolis, Minnesota, has two permanent vomitoria, one at stage left and one at stage right, of its thrust stage. The Circle in the Square Theatre, designed to reflect the theatres of ancient Greece and Rome, is the only Broadway theatre that has a vomitorium, which is still used in many of its productions as an entrance and exit for the actors.

The Cockpit Theatre, built in London in the 1960s, is one of the very few purpose-built theatres in the round in London, and features four vomitoria as corner entrances between four banks of raked seating arranged in a square.

The Chichester Festival Theatre, founded in 1962, was the first of its kind to be opened in the United Kingdom for 500 years, because there is no proscenium arch or wings. Instead, there is a thrust stage with vomitoria or "voms" for the audience and performers to enter and exit.

In addition, the Mark Taper Forum, one of the three theatres making up the Los Angeles Music Center, has two vomitoria. It has a strong thrust stage such that the audience sit in an amphitheatre-type array.

Winnipeg's second-largest theatre, Prairie Theatre Exchange, has two vomitoria on either side of its thrust stage, with seating on three sides.

The Space Theatre at the Denver Center for the Performing Arts is a theatre "in the round" with a pentagon configuration. It contains five vomitoria spaced 72 degrees apart, creating five equal seating sections.

== Common misconception ==
A common misconception about vomitoria is that Ancient Romans had designated spaces called vomitoria for the purpose of literal vomiting, so that they could purge to eat more, after binge eating.
