= Erik Brahe (1722–1756) =

Swedish count

Erik Brahe

Erik Brahe (23 June 1722 – 23 July 1756) was a Swedish count who was executed for treason as one of the conspirators participating in the failed Coup of 1756 of Queen Louisa Ulrika.

Brahe was born in Stockholm, the son of count Nils Brahe and Fredrika Vilhelmina Stenbock. He married 1745 to Eva Catharina Sack (1727–1753) and 1754 to Stina Piper, and became the father of Per Eriksson Brahe and Magnus Fredrik Brahe. Early on, he became a member of the Hovpartiet, with the goal to reintroduce absolute monarchy. He participated in the queen's failed Coup of 1756. He was judged guilty of treason and executed in Stockholm.
