= Coup of 1756 =

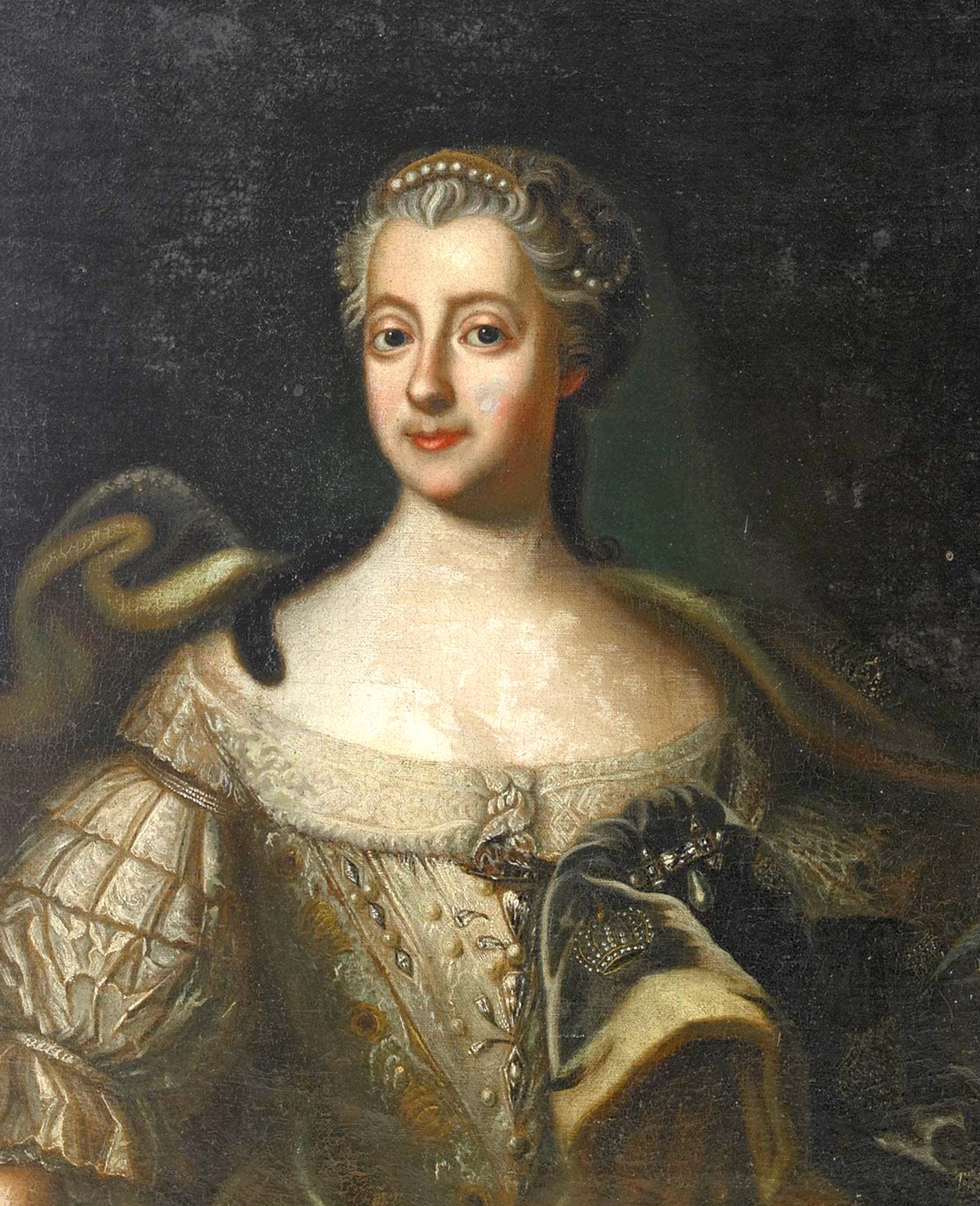
- Louisa Ulrika, the instigator of the coup.
Date	1756
Location	Sweden
Result	Revolutionary failure

Insurgents-Government
Supporters of Louisa Ulrika (Opposition to Parliamentary Rule)	The Riksdag of the Estates (Government)

Commanders and leaders
Louisa Ulrika of Prussia; Carl Gustaf Löwenhielm; Adam Horn; Nils Adam Bielke; Erik Brahe (executed); Magnus Stålsvärd (executed)	Axel von Fersen the Elder; Count Lorentz Creutz

Units involved
Närke Regiment; Life Guards	Unknown

Strength
Unknown	Unknown

The Coup of 1756 (Swedish: Kuppen 1756) was an attempted coup d'état planned by Queen Louisa Ulrika of Sweden to abolish the rule of the Riksdag of the Estates and reinstate absolute monarchy in Sweden. The attempted coup was exposed and subdued in 1756 shortly before it was due to be put in action. It caused a rift between the royal house and the parliament.

== Background ==
Since coming to Sweden after her marriage to Prince Adolf Frederick in 1744, Louisa Ulrika was displeased with the parliamentary system practiced in Sweden through the Instrument of Government, and wished to reinstate the system of absolute monarchy. After the accession to the throne of her spouse in 1751, she gathered a group consisting of supporters of absolute monarchy called Hovpartiet, consisting of Carl Gustaf Löwenhielm, Adam Horn, Nils Adam Bielke, Erik Brahe, Magnus Stålsvärd, Eric Wrangel, and Gustaf Jacob Horn. Already in 1751, the queen planned a coup d'état, but it had never been set in action.

In 1754, Carl Gustaf Tessin lost his position as royal governor of Crown Prince Gustav. Tessin was replaced as governor of the crown prince with Carl Fredrik Scheffer, a candidate selected by the Riksdag, an appointment which was enforced even after the candidate had been refused by the queen. In parallel, the Riksdag presented their decision to rectify the loop-holes in the constitution which Louisa Ulrika had used to claim that the King had greater constitutional power than the Riksdag had allowed him to practice. They stated that the monarch would no longer be allowed to refuse his signature: if he did so, a stamp with his name would be used. In the same time, a commission of the state began to investigate political crimes. This resulted in a prosecution of the followers of Louisa Ulrika within the Hovpartiet, one of whom, Eric Wrangel, fled to Norway to avoid arrest. Reportedly, this provocation triggered the queen's plan of a coup d'état.

== Initial plan ==
The first plan was for the royal couple to travel to Uppsala under the pretext of a visit to Drottningholm Palace. In Uppsala, they would summon the regiments of Närke, Värmland and potentially Uppland as well as the Life Guards with the aid of the colonels Stierneld and Kalling. Thereafter, they would march toward the capital. This plan was aborted because of the king's illness in April 1755, and new plans were made.

== Preparations ==
To finance the coup, the Queen pawned the jewelry she had been given as a wedding gift by the state, as well as some of the crown jewels belonging to the state, among them 44 diamonds she had removed from the Queen's Crown, which she pawned in Berlin. She negotiated with her relatives in Germany through her brother Prince Augustus Ferdinand of Prussia. She sent Johan Puke with them to Berlin, where they were placed as security for a loan by the help of her brother Prince Augustus William of Prussia. She also borrowed 6000 ducats from Charles I, Duke of Brunswick-Wolfenbüttel through count Johan August Meijerfeldt the Younger. At this point, rumors reached the Riksdag. A lady-in-waiting of the queen, Ulrika Strömfelt, who was a loyal follower of the Hats and not a supporter of absolute monarchy, reportedly informed the Riksdag that some of the crown jewels were missing.

In April 1756, the Riksdag demanded to inventory the crown jewels. The queen replied that she refused to allow them to see the crown jewels, which had been presented to her in Berlin upon her marriage, as she regarded them as her private property. She was, however, willing to allow them to see the jewels which had been presented to her since then, and after that, they could keep them. At this point, the king was taken ill, and she was thereby given the time to send for the jewels from Berlin, which were return to Sweden on 20 May. On 3 July, she presented the jewels she had initially agreed to show to the inventory, but still refused to present the "Berlin Jewels". She was finally forced to agree to present them for inventory on 22 June. To prevent this, she and her followers within the Hovpartiet, Hård, Horn and Brahe, planned to stage the coup before that day, despite the protests of king Adolf Frederick.

== Second plan ==
The plan was to bribe members of the public to create riots in the capital. The supporters of the Hovpartiet would then take control of the Stockholm guard and garrison, which were also to be prepared through bribes. When the military was called out to deal with the riots in the streets, it would instead seize control over the capital's military headquarters and army supplies; the Riksdag would be closed and the opposition arrested. A new Riksdag would then be summoned to Västerås or Norrköping, which would be made to approve a new constitution, reintroducing absolute monarchy.

== Exposure ==
On 20 June, Louisa Ulrika was informed of the details by the former court servant Ernst Angel. Angel was the illegitimate son of Maximilian of Hesse-Kassel, King Frederick's brother, which he often pointed out. Through her lady's maid mamsell Noveire, Angel told the queen that the plan was to be put in action. She summoned Horn, who denied that the coup was to take place that night. Angel had apparently talked about the coup in a drunken state in a bar, believed that the coup was to take place that same night. The queen told Horn to be careful and ordered him to "get rid of" Angel immediately. At the same time, one of the royalist officers, Christiernin, had asked a corporal Schedvin if he was "prepared" to be "faithful to his King". Schedvin informed lieutenant count Lorentz Creutz, a member of the Hats, who informed the Hat party leader Axel von Fersen the Elder.

On 22 June 1756, the king and queen left the capital for Ulriksdal Palace to avoid being present during the inventory of the crown jewels, while Ehrensvärd, their follower within the capital garrison, prepared for the coup. That same day, however, Ernst Angel, Christiernin, Stålsvärd, Puke, Angel and a number of others were arrested. During the interrogation, Ernst Angel revealed the whole plot. In the afternoon, the queen was informed of the arrests by Horn. Count Meijerfeldt advised her to leave for Uppsala immediately, use their initial plan of the previous year, and march for Stockholm. Horn, however, advised her to wait for the return of Brahe and Ribbing. In the end, no action was taken.

When the king and queen returned to the capital the same night, the streets were patrolled by a militia of nobles, and cannons were aimed at the Royal Palace. Upon their arrival, Axel von Fersen sent them a formal report of what had happened. Horn was called away, and the royal couple spent their night with Ribbing and Meijerfelt, discussing what action to take. The queen had plans to escape with the use of the royal guard, but the guard refused their support. The following morning, the queen summoned Brahe, Hård and Rudbeck. A plan was made for the queen to escape to Uppsala, but Rudbeck refused to agree. He being the commander of the Uppsala garrison, the plan could not be realized without his support. With this, the coup was finally aborted.

== Consequences ==
During late June 1756, the members of the Hovpartiet were arrested or fled to avoid arrest. Louisa Ulrika unsuccessfully tried to prevent their arrest. Even the queen's favorite Ulrika Eleonora von Düben fled the royal court. King Adolf Frederick formed a statement in which he condemned the attempted coup. On 17 June 1756, the members of the Hovpartiet were condemned to death. The Riksdag voted for a death sentence for four of the involved noblemen, who were decapitated on Riddarholmstorget outside of the Royal Palace in Stockholm. Three days later, Ernst Angel and three more were decapitated. Several others were sentenced to prison, whipping, exile and the pillory, and banned from seats in the parliament. The royal couple left for Ulriksdal Palace to avoid being present during their executions.

The Riksdag of the Estates was well aware that queen Louisa Ulrika was responsible as the leader of the attempted coup d'état, and there were discussions as how to deal with the queen's guilt. The minutes of the debate are, however, not preserved. Reportedly, there were suggestions to have her separated from the king through divorce, or have her exiled from the kingdom, or to a distant province. In the end, however, no action was taken against her, possibly with consideration to foreign powers.

On 4 August 1756, a delegation from the Riksdag, led by the archbishop and Bishop Samuel Troilius, presented Louisa Ulrika with a note, to which she was made to reply with a letter of regret. The declaration stated that "she had forgotten her duty to God, her consort, and the Kingdom of Sweden, and that she was responsible for the blood of the recently executed". She officially replied to the note from the Riksdag with gratitude for the reprimands on the behalf of the good of the nation and herself, and assured "that she had wished no evil upon the Kingdom": Troilius reported that "only God knows if it was said by heart, though one should hope for the best". The archbishop reported that he observed "tears of rage and sorrow" in her eyes. In private, Louisa Ulrika regarded the reprimand as a humiliating insult, and wrote to her brother Frederick the Great that during the interview she attempted to display "all the coldness, all the contempt possible to make in a demonstration [...] In my hardest moments I remind myself that I am the sister of Frederick the Great", and that she regretted nothing but that her revolution had failed.

The king was also informed by the Riksdag that he would be deposed if such an incident were ever to occur again.

Ulrika Strömfelt lost her position at court, but was rewarded by the state with the honorary title Ständernas dotter (English:"Daughter of the Parliament") and a pension of $2000.

== See also ==
- December Crisis (1768)
- Revolution of 1772
- Coup of 1809
