= Paleologus of Pesaro =

English-Italian noble family of Greek descent

Paleologus Palaiologos, Palaeologus, Paleologue
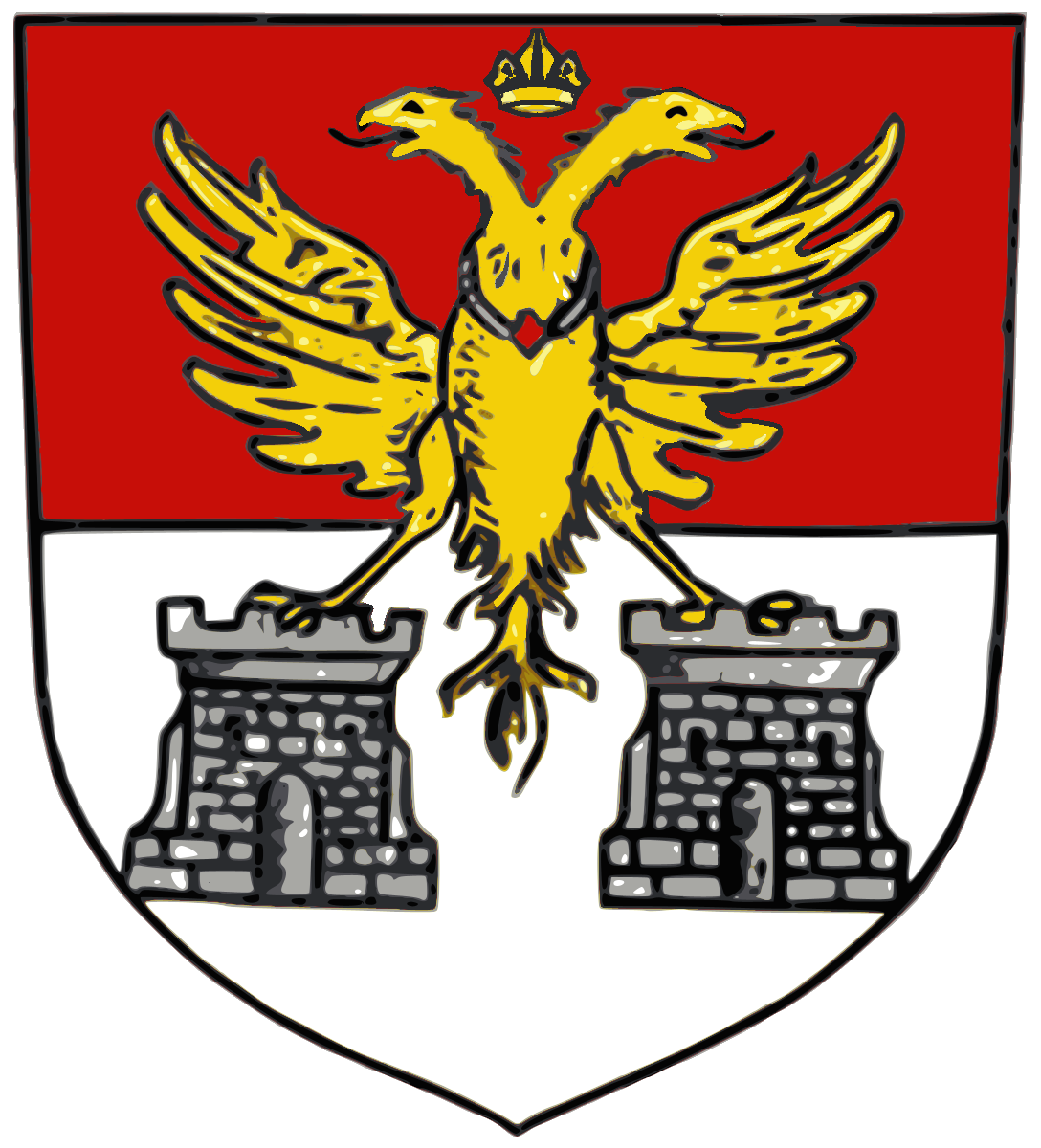
- Reconstructed coat of arms of Theodore Paleologus. Colors are conjectural but follow Hall (2015).
- Parent house: Palaiologos (?)
- Country: Duchy of Urbino; Kingdom of England; British West Indies
- Founded: Late 15th or early 16th century
- Founder: John Palaiologos, son of Thomas Palaiologos (?)
- Final head: Godscall Paleologue
- Traditions: Roman Catholicism (16th century); Church of England (17th century)
- Dissolution: Late 17th or 18th century

The Paleologus family (pl. Paleologi; Italian: Paleologo), also called Palaiologos, Palaeologus and Paleologue, were a noble family from Pesaro in Italy who later established themselves in England in the 17th century. They might have been late-surviving descendants of the Palaiologos dynasty, rulers of the Byzantine Empire from 1259/1261 to its fall in 1453.

Members of the family claimed to be descendants of Thomas Palaiologos, a younger brother of the final Byzantine emperor, Constantine XI Palaiologos, though modern historians are divided on whether their line of descent is true. With the exception of a single figure in their purported genealogy, a son of Thomas by the name of John who is absent in contemporary sources, their claimed line of descent can be verified through documents at Pesaro. None of their contemporaries ever doubted their claims to imperial descent. If they were descendants of the Palaiologoi emperors, they were the last living members of the Palaiologos dynasty.

For much of their early history in Pesaro, the members of the Paleologus family served the town's ruling House of Della Rovere in a military capacity. After brothers Leonidas and Scipione Paleologus, together with their nephew Theodore, were arrested for attempted murder, the family was disgraced in Pesaro and Theodore was forced into exile. After working as a soldier and assassin, Theodore arrived in England in 1597 and eventually settled in Cornwall. He had several children, but only one of them, Ferdinand, who later settled in Barbados, is known to have had children of his own. The last known living member of the family, Godscall Paleologue, is last attested as a newborn baby in 1694 and her subsequent fate is unknown.

== Descent from the Palaiologos dynasty ==
=== Background ===
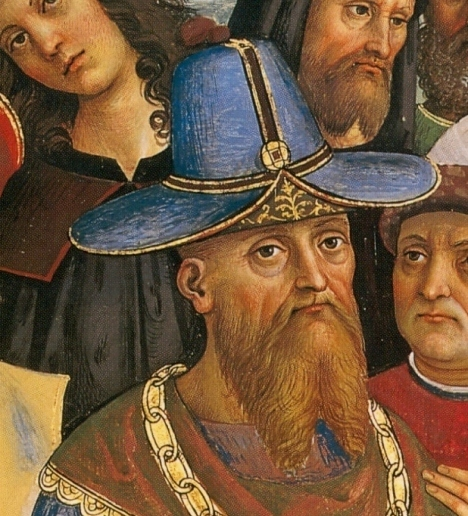
Thomas Palaiologos, detail from the Pintoricchio fresco of Pius II's arrival at Ancona, in the Siena Cathedral

The Palaiologos dynasty was the last imperial dynasty of the Byzantine Empire and one of the empire's longest ruling dynasties, ruling the empire from 1259/1261 to its fall in 1453. As the Byzantine Empire collapsed over the course of the 14th and 15th centuries due to internal strife and the aggressive expansion of the Ottoman Empire, many Byzantine nobles fled their crumbling empire, travelling to Western Europe. With the Fall of Constantinople in 1453 and the fall of the Despotate of the Morea, a Byzantine province, in 1460, the Palaiologoi were dispossessed. In November 1460, the highest-profile Byzantine exile of them all, Thomas Palaiologos, younger brother of the final emperor Constantine XI, arrived in Rome, hoping to convince Pope Pius II to call for a crusade so that the empire could be restored.

Despite the hopes of Thomas, no crusade would ever be called again and Constantinople remained in Turkish hands. He died in Rome and was survived by at least four children; Helena, Zoe, Andreas and Manuel. His daughters had many descendants, but none carried the Palaiologos name, and while the elder son Andreas is most often presumed to have been childless, Manuel had two children; John and another Andreas, who converted to Islam. John died young but Andreas lived longer, though is not believed to have had any children of his own. With his death at some point in the 16th century, the imperial line of the Palaiologoi would thus have been rendered extinct.

This did little to stop individuals in various parts of Europe from claiming descent from the old imperial dynasty. The family name Palaiologos had been relatively widespread in the Byzantine Empire, and the family had been quite extensive before a branch of it acceded to the imperial throne. Many of the non-imperial Byzantine Palaiologoi were part of the nobility and served as generals or powerful landowners. Many Byzantine refugees, though unrelated to the emperors, legitimately bore the name Palaiologos due to the extensive nature of the family. Because the name could lend whoever bore it prestige (as well as possible monetary support), many refugees fabricated closer links to the imperial dynasty and were because of this welcomed at courts in Western Europe since many Western rulers were conscious of their failure to prevent Byzantium's fall. It would have helped that many in Western Europe would have been unaware of the intricacies of Byzantine naming customs; to Western Europeans, the name Palaiologos meant the imperial dynasty.

=== Existence of John Palaiologos ===
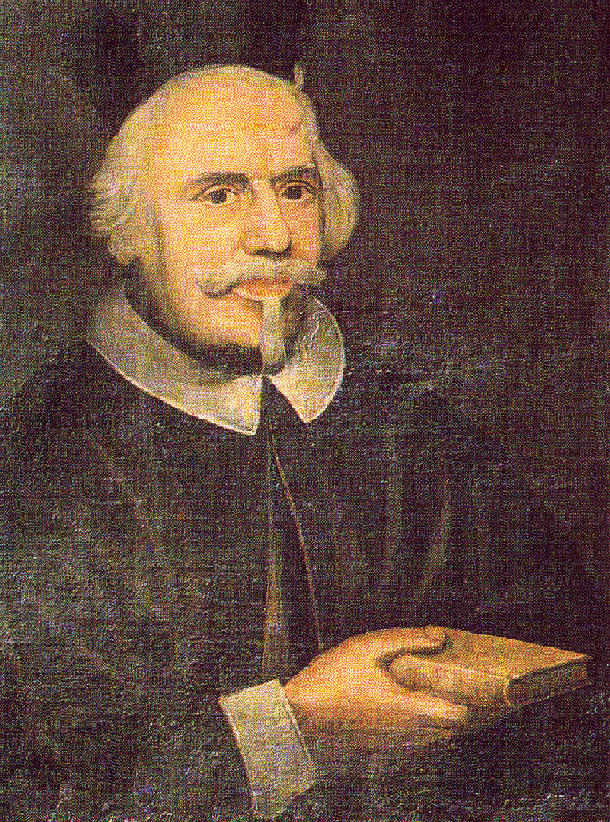
Portrait of Leo Allatius, keeper of the Vatican Library, who in 1648 wrote that Thomas Palaiologos had the three sons Andreas, Manuel and John

The Paleologus family, attested as living in Pesaro, Italy, from the early 16th century onwards, claimed descent from a third son of Thomas Palaiologos, called John. As of yet, there is no independent evidence that Thomas had a son by the name John (or indeed that this John actually existed). The most widely accepted source on the life of Thomas Palaiologos, the works of contemporary Byzantine historian George Sphrantzes, mentions all the other four children but fails to mention John. Sphrantzes's works are not unquestionable, however. It appears that much of it was rewritten by an editor at a later date and the timeline the works provide is somewhat questionable, having Thomas's wife Catherine give birth to one of their children at the age of 65.

The earliest source unrelated to the Paleologi of Pesaro themselves that mentions a son of Thomas by the name John is the writings of the Greek scholar Leo Allatius. Allatius wrote in 1648, too late for his works to act as independent evidence for the descent of the Paleologus family, but he was the keeper of the Vatican Library and would have had access to its vast collection of books and records and might have deduced his findings from there. It is possible that Allatius had access to earlier documents, now lost, which would have proven the legitimacy of the Paleologus line. Allatius gives the sons of Thomas as "Andrea, Manuele and Ioanne". It would be difficult to explain why Allatius, a respected and famous scholar, would simply fabricate a member of the imperial dynasty.

It is possible that John is a later corruption of the name Leone (the names are similar in their Latin form, John being rendered as Ioannes and Leone being rendered as Leonis) and there are some references to a Leone Palaiologos in Pesaro, notably a 1535 document which speaks of the “long and faithful service of Leone Palaiologos to the papal captain Giovanni della Rovere”. Assuming that a “long and faithful” service means at least a few decades, Leone would have entered Giovanni's service in a time when Thomas's arrival to Italy would have been in recent memory and it would have been very difficult to fake kinship with him. John could thus have been a real historical figure and a genuine son of Thomas Palaiologos, possibly illegitimate. It is also possible that John was a son of either one of Thomas's historically verified sons, Andreas or Manuel (who actually had a son by that name). If the existence of John is accepted, in some form, there is little reason to doubt the descent of the Paleologi in Pesaro. The members of the family probably believed it themselves and by the time they arrived in England, none of their contemporaries doubted their imperial descent.

The lineage of the Paleologus family remained unquestioned until modern times. Tradition has it that during the Greek War of Independence (1821–1829), over a century after the Paleologi disappeared from history, a delegation was sent by the provisional government in Athens to find living descendants of the old imperial family. The delegation visited places in Italy where Palaiologoi were known to have resided and even came to Cornwall, where Theodore Paleologus had lived in the 17th century. Local tradition on Barbados has it that the delegation also sent a letter to the authorities on Barbados, inquiring if descendants of Ferdinand Paleologus still lived on the island. The letter supposedly requested that if that was the case, the head of the family should be provided with the means of returning to Greece, with the trip paid for by the Greek government. Ultimately, the delegation's search was in vain and they found no living embodiments of their lost empire. The 19th-century English priest Arthur Penrhyn Stanley claimed that the delegation had intended to make the head of the family, had one been found, into the sovereign of Greece. English historian William Henry Hamilton Rogers wrote in 1890 in regards to this possibility, "how strange would have been the circumstance had such an undoubted descendant been discovered, and the imperial eagle arisen like a phoenix from the ashes of time, and strove to consolidate the shifting fortunes of this heroic and struggling people".

An article from 11 May 1913 in The San Francisco Call, titled Find in England, Traces of Dynasty, Once Ruled the World, identified the Paleologus family as "by descent rightful rulers of the empire of the east" and stated that there may yet be more research to be done in an attempt to track down potential descendants of the family "if fortune's whirligig should bring about circumstances requiring that the hereditary emperor of the east should be sought out to reign once more in Constantinople". As late as 1940, English historian Sir Stanley Casson described Theodore Paleologus, the family's most famous member, as the "last recorded heir to Byzantium".

Beginning with English historian Steven Runciman's 1965 book The Fall of Constantinople, in which the double-headed eagle on the tombstone of Theodore is described as having "no business to be there", a number modern scholars have dismissed the later Paleologi as impostors, mainly on account of the lack of evidence for John's existence. English historian Jonathan Harris commented that the precise genealogy presented on the tombstone is "almost certainly incorrect". Some, such as English byzantinist Donald Nicol, simply maintained that their claim to descend from Thomas Palaiologos are unproven, whereas others, such as English historians John Julius Norwich and Richard Jenkyns, considered it plausible that they were the last true descendants of the Palaiologos dynasty. John Hall, author of a 2015 biography of Theodore Paleologus, questioned if it was really important whether the Paleologi of Pesaro were true imperial descendants or not but nevertheless concluded that it was likely that they were, noting that he believed John Palaiologos to have been an illegitimate son of Thomas Palaiologos.

== History ==
=== In Pesaro ===
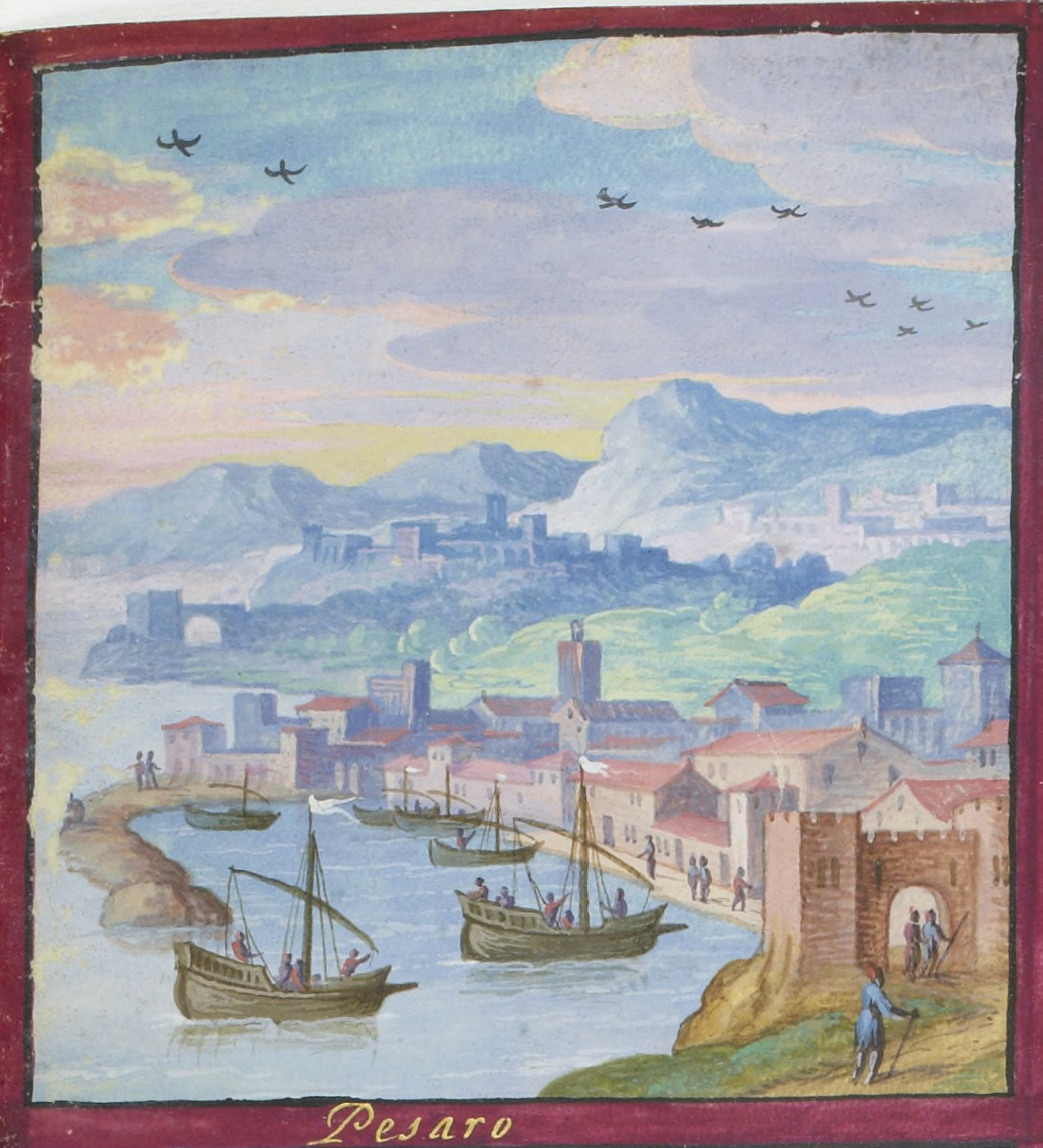
Miniature painting depicting Pesaro in 1578

With the critical exception of John Palaiologos, the existence of other ancestors claimed by the later members of the Paleologus family can be verified through records at Pesaro. John's supposed son, Theodore, and grandson, Prosper, have been proven to be real historical figures. Prosper is documented as one of Pesaro's most prominent nobles in 1537 and is recorded as having been alive as late as 1580. Both Theodore and Prosper served Pesaro's ruling family, the Della Rovere family, in a military capacity. The records at Pesaro also prove the existence of a younger brother of Prosper, Guidobaldo Paleologus, who served as Capitan dei Porto in Pesaro, attested as such in 1578.

Prosper had three known sons; Camilio (of which next to nothing is known), Leonidas and Scipione. In 1578, Leonidas and Scipione lived together with Camilio's young son, Theodore, and found themselves embroiled in a scandal as they were convicted for the attempted murder of Leone Ramusciatti, a man who was also originally of Greek descent. Having failed to kill Leone, the three Paleologi had barricaded themselves in a church in an attempt to avoid arrest. Documentation from Pesaro refer to the three as a something akin to a gang and allude to a previous (successful) murder conducted by them. The fate of Scipione is unknown, but Leonidas was executed. Theodore, who is referred to as a minor (he was probably 16–18 years old) was spared the death penalty and instead banished not only from Pesaro, but from the entire Duchy of Urbino.

=== In England and elsewhere ===
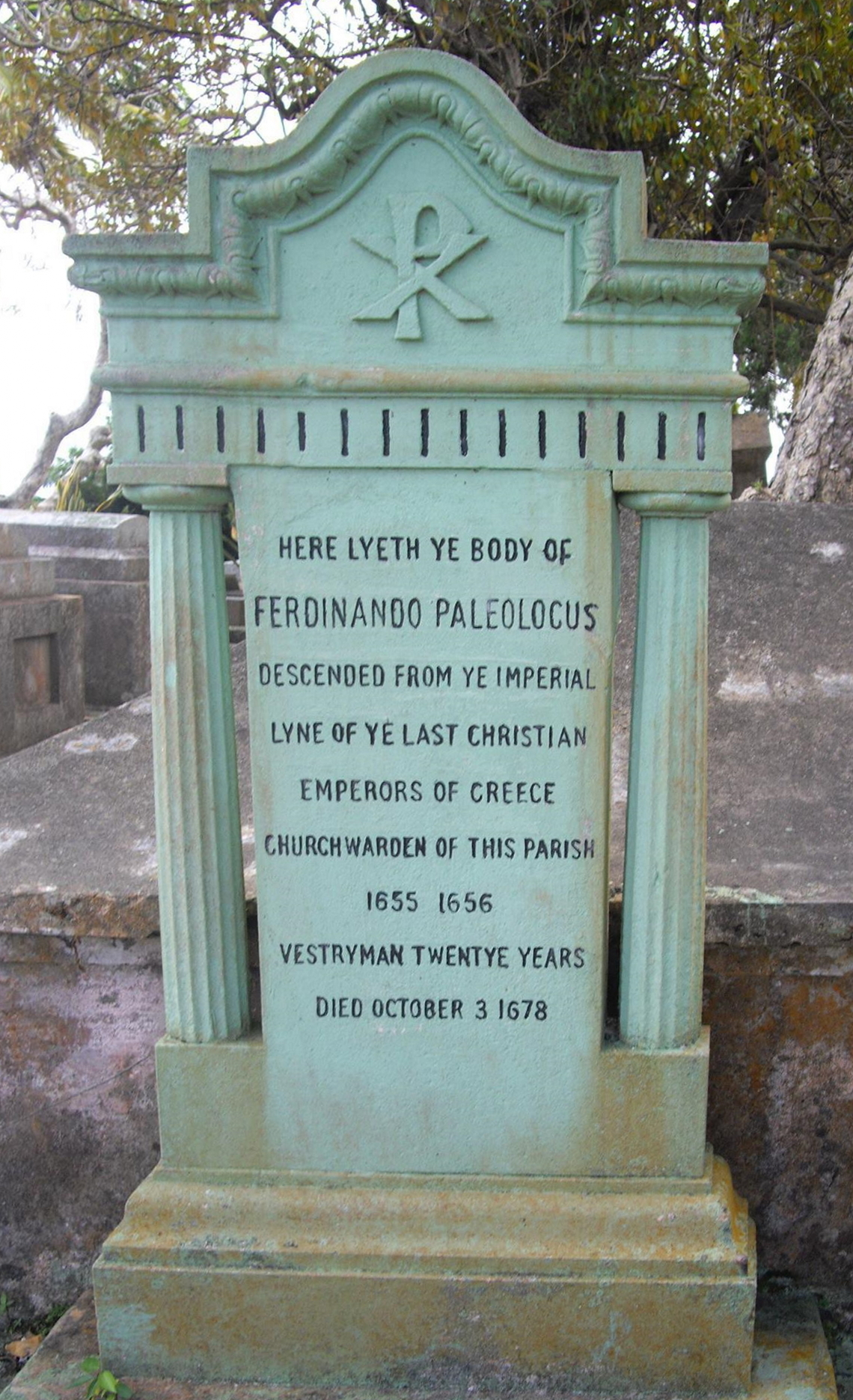
Monument commemorating the 1670 (the monument erroneously gives the year as 1678) death of Ferdinand Paleologus in Barbados

After being exiled, Theodore is next attested upon his arrival to England in 1597, there to kill a man named Alessandro Antelminelli, wanted by the authorities of the Republic of Lucca. At this point, Theodore had established himself as an assassin, and seems to have had an impressive reputation. Ultimately, Theodore failed to kill Antelminelli, and perhaps because he wanted a safer and more stable profession (he was around 40 years old), he stayed in England for the rest of his life, first entering into the service of Henry Clinton, the Earl of Lincoln. Clinton was almost sixty years old and one of the most brutal, feared and hated feudal lords in Britain. Clinton is frequently described as waging war on his neighbors and is often credited with rioting, abduction, arson, sabotage, extortion and perjury. At one point, Clinton even expanded his castle walls into the nearby churchyard.

While in Clinton's service, Theodore met his wife, Mary Balls, with whom he had six, possibly seven, children. When Clinton died in 1616, the fate of the family is unknown, but they were no longer present at the Earl's seat in Tattershall. Three years later, Theodore, Mary and some of the children lived in Plymouth, where Theodore in 1628 attempted to enter into the service of George Villiers, the Duke of Buckingham, who was almost as hated in England as the Earl of Lincoln had been. Villiers was assassinated soon thereafter, however, and Theodore was instead invited to stay with Sir Nicholas Lower, a rich Cornish squire, at his home in Landulph, Cornwall, called Clifton Hall. Clifton Hall was divided as to give place to two families, and Theodore was joined by his wife and some of his children.

When Theodore died in 1636, the family seemed to be well-off. He was survived by five of his children; the two daughters Dorothy and Mary and the three sons Theodore Junior, John and Ferdinand. Of the two daughters, only Dorothy married and she probably never had children. The fates of the three brothers were caught up in the English Civil War of 1642–1651. Theodore Junior supported the Roundheads, who meant to end absolute monarchy in Britain, and did not survive the war, probably dying of camp fever during the early stages of the long Siege of Oxford. He was buried in Westminster Abbey, where his grave still remains. The other two brothers were Cavaliers, or royalists, and fled the country during the war.

Both Ferdinand and John were in Barbados, among the first colonists on the island, in 1644. John disappears from history soon thereafter, but Ferdinand stayed on the island for the rest of his life, becoming known there as the "Greek prince from Cornwall". He quickly became one of the elite on the island, cultivating cotton or sugar and possibly pineapples and was highly influential in the affairs of the local St. John's Parish Church. He constructed a great mansion called Clifton Hall, named after the family's home in Cornwall, which stands on the island to this day, recognized as one of the oldest and grandest great houses in Barbados.

Ferdinand had only one known child, his son Theodore, who soon left Barbados, returning to England and becoming a privateer. He lived in Stepney, London and died at sea near A Coruña, Spain in 1693. The only surviving child of Theodore, and the last known member of the family overall, was Theodore's posthumous daughter Godscall Paleologue, born on 12 January 1694. There are no sources on Godscall beyond her baptismal records and her subsequent fate is unknown.

== Heraldry ==
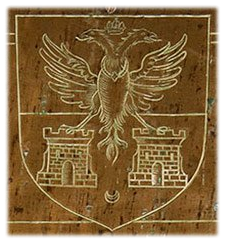
Coat of arms of Theodore Paleologus, as presented on his tombstone

Heraldry in a West-European sense, permanent motifs transmitted through hereditary right, was never adopted in the Byzantine Empire. During the last few centuries of the empire's existence, a double-headed eagle symbol was increasingly associated with imperial power, with senior members of the Palaiologos dynasty typically using it as a personal symbol. The only preserved illustration of a coat of arms of the Paleologi of Pesaro is the depiction of one on the tombstone of Theodore Paleologus in Landulph, Cornwall. Theodore's coat of arms prominently displays a double-headed eagle, harkening back to the old emperors, but also incorporates two towers, the meaning of which is unknown. John Hall believes the towers to represent the gates of Rome and Constantinople. Above the double-headed eagle is an imperial crown.

The arms on the tombstone also features a small crescent at the bottom. In English heraldry, such a crescent denotes someone as a second son, meaning that it is possible that Theodore had an older brother, but no older son of Camilio Paleologus is known. It is possible that the crescent was mistakenly added by Nicholas Lower, who commissioned the tombstone after Theodore's death.

The shield on the tombstone is divided into two sections by a line behind the double-headed eagle, which indicates that it would have had two background colors. Since the tombstone itself is colorless, what these colors were is unknown. Hall believes that the colors may have been red and white, since these colors were prominently used by the Palaiologoi emperors.

== Family tree ==
Follows Hall (2015).

Thomas Palaiologos; 1409–1465
John Palaiologos (?)
Theodore Paleologus; 1504–1540
Prosper Paleologus fl. 1537–1580	Guidobaldo Paleologus fl. 1578
Camilio Paleologus	Leonidas Paleologus ?–1578	Scipione Paleologus fl. 1578
Theodore Paleologus c. 1560–1636	Mary Balls c. 1575–1631
William Arundel ?–1684	Dorothy Paleologus; 1606–1681	Mary Paleologus ?–1674	Theodore (II) Paleologus; 1609–1644	John Paleologus; 1611–?	Ferdinand Paleologus; 1619–1670	Rebecca Pomfrett
Martha Bradbury	Theodore (III) Paleologus c. 1660–1693
Godscall Paleologue; 1694–?

== See also ==
- Succession to the Byzantine Empire
