= Ferdinand Paleologus =

17th-century English freeholder in Barbados

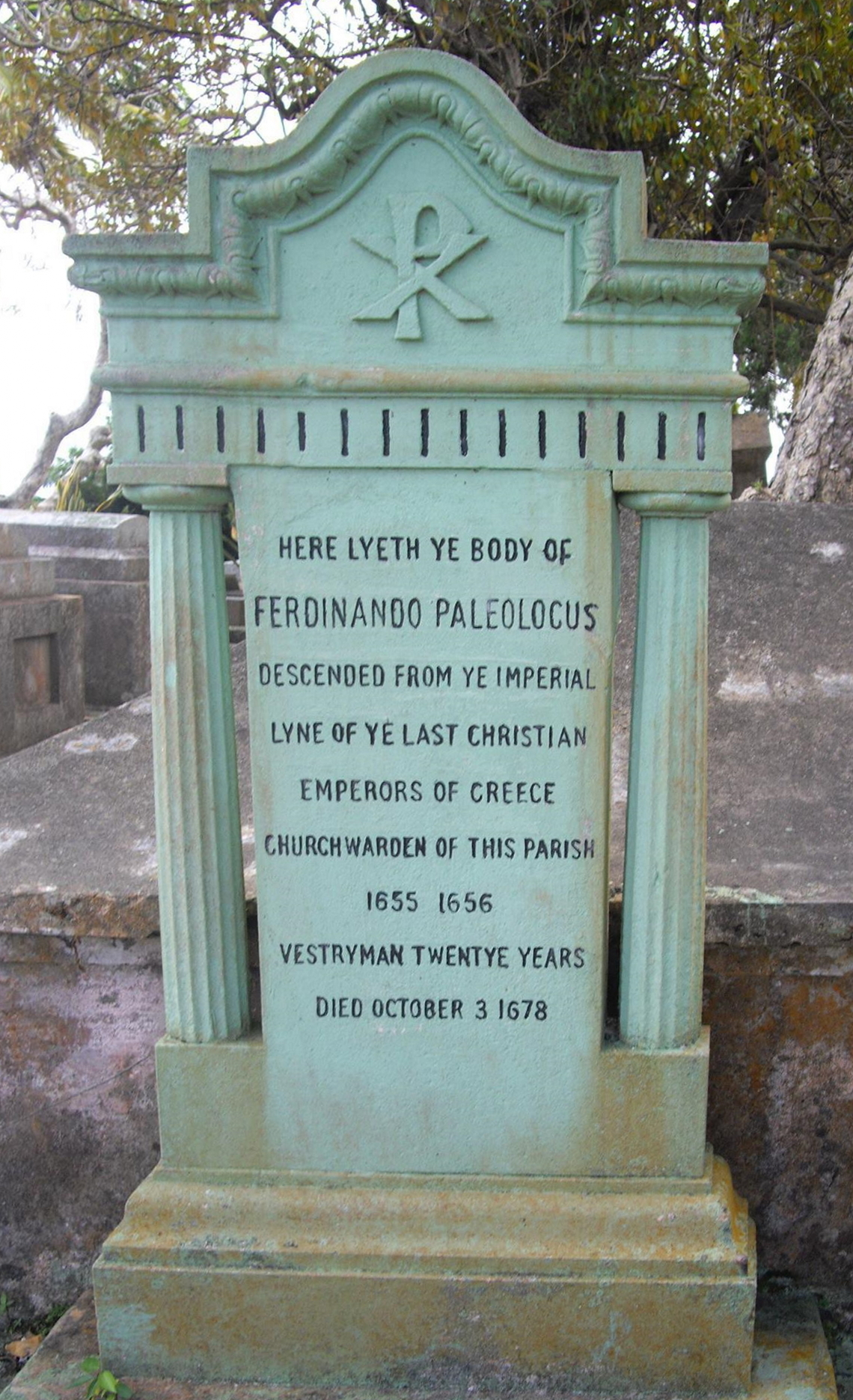
- Monument erected in 1906 near Ferdinand's grave in Saint John, Barbados. The date of Ferdinand's death presented on the monument, 3 October 1678, is erroneous
- Born: June 1619; Plymouth, Kingdom of England
- Died: 2 October 1670 (aged 51); Colony of Barbados
- Buried: Saint Johns Parish Church Cemetery; Saint John, Barbados
- Noble family: Paleologus
- Spouse: Rebecca Pomfrett
- Issue: Theodore Paleologus
- Father: Theodore Paleologus
- Mother: Mary Balls
- Occupation: Soldier, vestryman, churchwarden, owner of a cotton or sugar (and possibly pineapple) plantation

Ferdinand Paleologus (Italian: Ferdinando Paleologo; June 1619 – 2 October 1670) was a 17th-century English-Greek freeholder, sugar or cotton planter and churchwarden and possibly one of the last living members of the Palaiologos dynasty, which had ruled the Byzantine Empire from 1259 to its fall in 1453. Ferdinand was the fourth and youngest son of Theodore Paleologus, a Greek soldier and assassin who moved to England in the late 16th century.

Ferdinand supported the royalist side in the English Civil War (1642–1651), but emigrated to Barbados during (or possibly before) the conflict, perhaps fleeing punishment as the royalists were being defeated or perhaps seeking his fortune with relatives of his mother, who lived on the island. Ferdinand is first attested on the island in 1644 and he quickly integrated himself with its elite. He cultivated cotton or sugar and possibly pineapples and was influential in the affairs of the local St. John's Parish Church, for which he became a vestryman and then a churchwarden. Ferdinand constructed a great mansion called Clifton Hall, named after the home he had lived in with his family in Cornwall. Clifton Hall, though radically changed since Ferdinand's time, remains to this day one of the largest, grandest and oldest great houses in Barbados.

By the time of his death in 1670, Ferdinand had become known on the island as the "Greek prince from Cornwall", a nickname he would be remembered by for centuries. The current marker for his gravesite at St. John's Parish Church, which erroneously gives the date of his death as 1678 instead of 1670, was erected in 1906 and is a local tourist spot.

== Biography ==
=== Early life ===
Ferdinand Paleologus was the fourth son of Theodore Paleologus by his wife, Mary Balls, and was baptised in the Church of St. Andrew in Plymouth on 15 June 1619 (meaning he was probably born in early June), the baptismal register recording him as "Ffardinando son of Theodore Paleologus an Ittalian". Ferdinand's full name appears to have been William Ferdinand Paleologus, but the only known reference to the name William comes from documentation of his election as vestryman in 1649, most other sources referring to him simply as Ferdinand Paleologus. As the son of Theodore Paleologus, Ferdinand might have been one of the last living descendants of the Palaiologos dynasty, rulers of the Byzantine Empire from 1259 to 1453. The lineage of Ferdinand and Theodore can be verified as true with the exception of an ancestor called John, purported to be the son of Thomas Palaiologos but absent in contemporary sources, making their descent from the emperors plausible, but somewhat uncertain. None of Theodore's and Ferdinand's contemporaries doubted their imperial descent. Ferdinand had three older brothers; Theodore (who died in infancy), Theodore Junior and John Theodore, and two older sisters; Dorothy and Mary.

After his baptism in 1619, the next record of Ferdinand is his name appearing on the list of soldiers present at St Michael's Fort in Plymouth Sound in 1639. Before then he had likely lived with his father Theodore and his sisters Dorothy and Mary, first in Plymouth and then in Landulph, Cornwall. This listing suggests that Ferdinand, at age 19, had chosen to support the royalist side in the English Civil War of 1642–1651 (the opposite side of his brother Theodore Junior). Unlike Theodore Junior, Ferdinand was not a commander in any capacity but a common soldier.

What happened to Ferdinand immediately after 1639 is unclear, since he is absent from army lists compiled by both the parliamentarists and the royalists in 1642 (though these army lists are lists of officers only). It is possible that he was either one of the royalists who chose to flee to Barbados to avoid punishment in England or that he had escaped to Barbados already before the war broke out. A likely explanation is that Ferdinand sought his fortune with his relatives, the Balls family from Suffolk, from which his mother had been. There were no less than three plantations owned by the Balls family on Barbados, including the largest plantation on the island. Ferdinand, and the Balls family before him, were some of the earliest settlers on the island, which had only been discovered around 1620. The British had first settled the island in 1627.

=== Life in Barbados ===
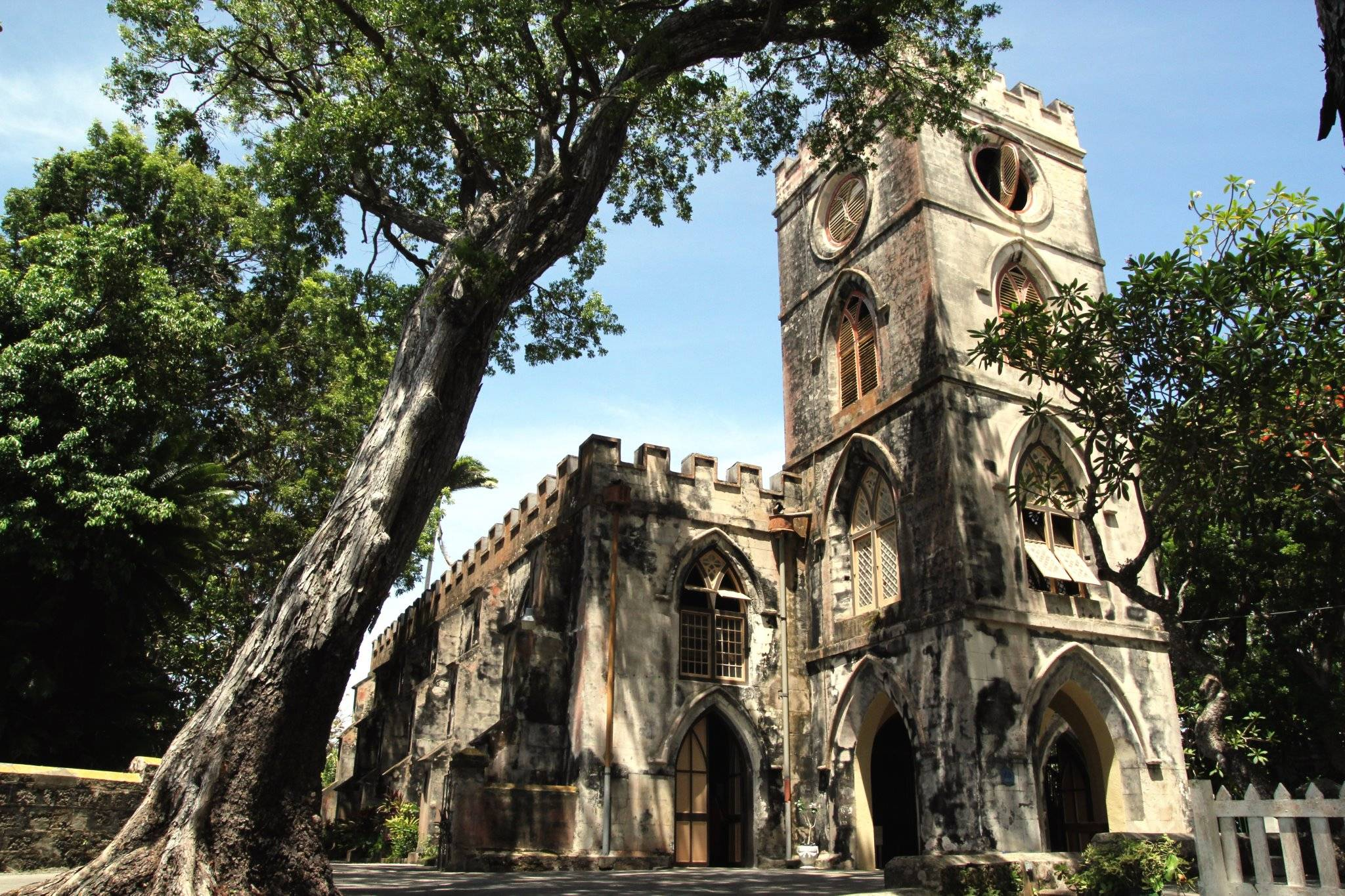
St. John's Parish Church, Barbados, which Ferdinand supported throughout his life

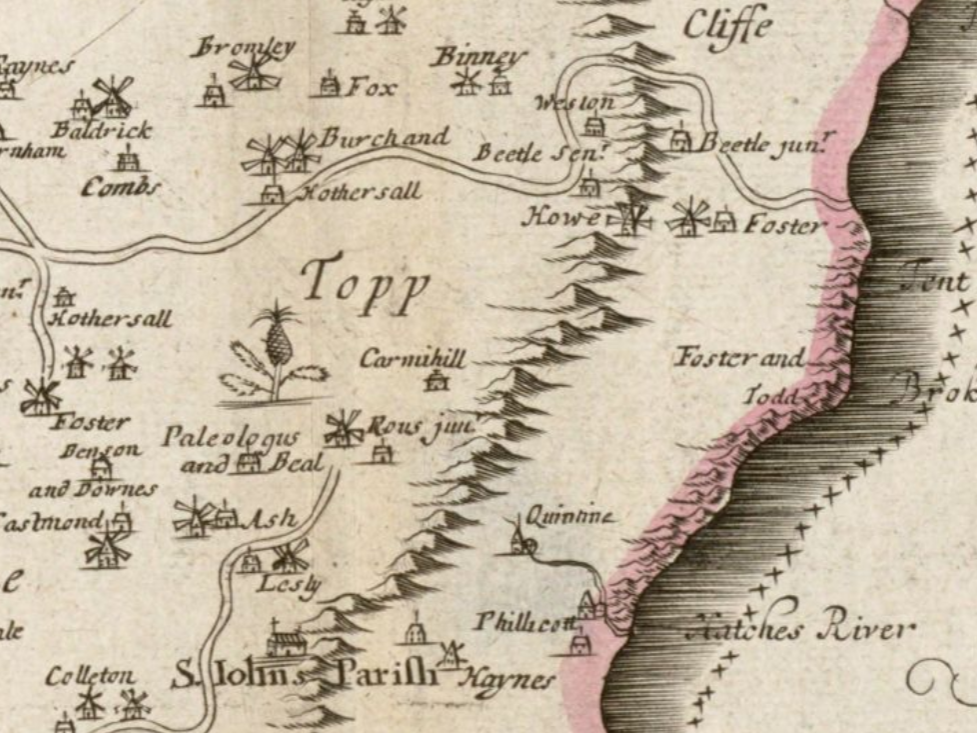
The "Paleologus and Beal" plantation on a 1685 map of Barbados, marked with a pineapple (to the left, below "Topp")

Ferdinand's presence in Barbados is first attested on 26 June 1644, when he and his older brother John Theodore are attested as witnesses to a deed. Ferdinand gradually integrated himself with the Barbadian elite. Some time before 1649, he had become a freeholder, probably with the support of the Balls family, and he married Rebecca Pomfrett, daughter of a local landowner. He built and owned an estate called Clifton Hall, named after the home he and his family had lived in while in Landulph, and owned a small cotton or sugar plantation. Clifton Hall is located on the heights of Saint John, near St. John's Parish Church, which Ferdinand supported throughout his life.

Clifton Hall still stands today and remains recognised as one of the largest, grandest and oldest great houses on Barbados. Clifton Hall has changed radically since Ferdinand's time, most of the rooms and exterior dating to renovation and construction projects in the early 19th century. Only the kitchen and staff quarters, alongside two small rooms currently used as changing rooms for the swimming pool, remain intact from the 17th century.

In 1649, Ferdinand was elected to the vestry of St. John's parish. In the early years of the island, such vestrymen were powerful establishment figures. Over the years, he gradually added to his property, being recorded as purchasing more land in July 1662. On a 1685 map of Barbados, a plantation labelled the "Paleologus and Beal" plantation, to the west of St John's Church, is marked with the drawing of a pineapple, meaning that Ferdinand might have cultivated pineapples in addition to cultivating sugar or cotton. Like other owners of plantations, Ferdinand would have employed slaves at his plantation. In the late 17th century, at least 2000 slaves were imported to Barbados each year.

By 1655, Ferdinand was a churchwarden and in 1656 and 1660 he was a trustee. He also concerned himself with affairs unrelated to the church, being attested as a lieutenant in 1654 and as a surveyor of the highways in 1660. He became known on the island as the "Greek prince from Cornwall", and was long remembered by that nickname after his death.

=== Death ===
Ferdinand was recorded as absent from a meeting of the vestry in January 1670, probably on account of ill health. His condition would worsen over the course of the following months and on 26 September that year, he made a will, which begins:

In the name of God, Amen. I Ferdinand Paleologus, of the parish of St John's, being sick in body, but in perfect memory, commit my soul into the hands of Almighty God, my most merciful Creator, and my body to be interred in a Christian burial, there to attend the joyful resurrection of the just to eternal life by Jesus Christ my most blessed Saviour and Redeemer.

In the will, half of Ferdinand's estate was willed to his wife Rebecca and the other half to his son, Theodore (who is identified by the odd spelling Theodorious). Theodore's inheritance was to be employed for his "maintenance and education, together with the increase of his Estate, until he attains the age of fourteen years". Ferdinand's sisters Dorothy and Mary were willed twenty shillings each and further money and items of value were willed to Ferdinand's godson Ralph Hassall and his friend Edward Walrond. The will was amended on 2 October, to state that Rebecca was to inherit the entire estate if Theodore died before her without children of his own. The will was witnessed by men of influence on Barbados; Tobias Bridge, George Hanmer and Thomas Kendall. The same witnesses were present when the will was amended, in addition to Abraham Pomfrett, Rebecca's brother.

Various inaccurate dates for Ferdinand's death have been provided over the years, mostly on account of the crabbed handwriting in some of these documents. The date provided on his gravestone (erected in 1906) wrongly gives his date of death as 3 October 1678. It is likely that he died on, or soon after, the date his will was amended, 2 October 1670. He was buried at the cemetery of St. John's Parish Church.

== Legacy ==
=== Gravesite ===
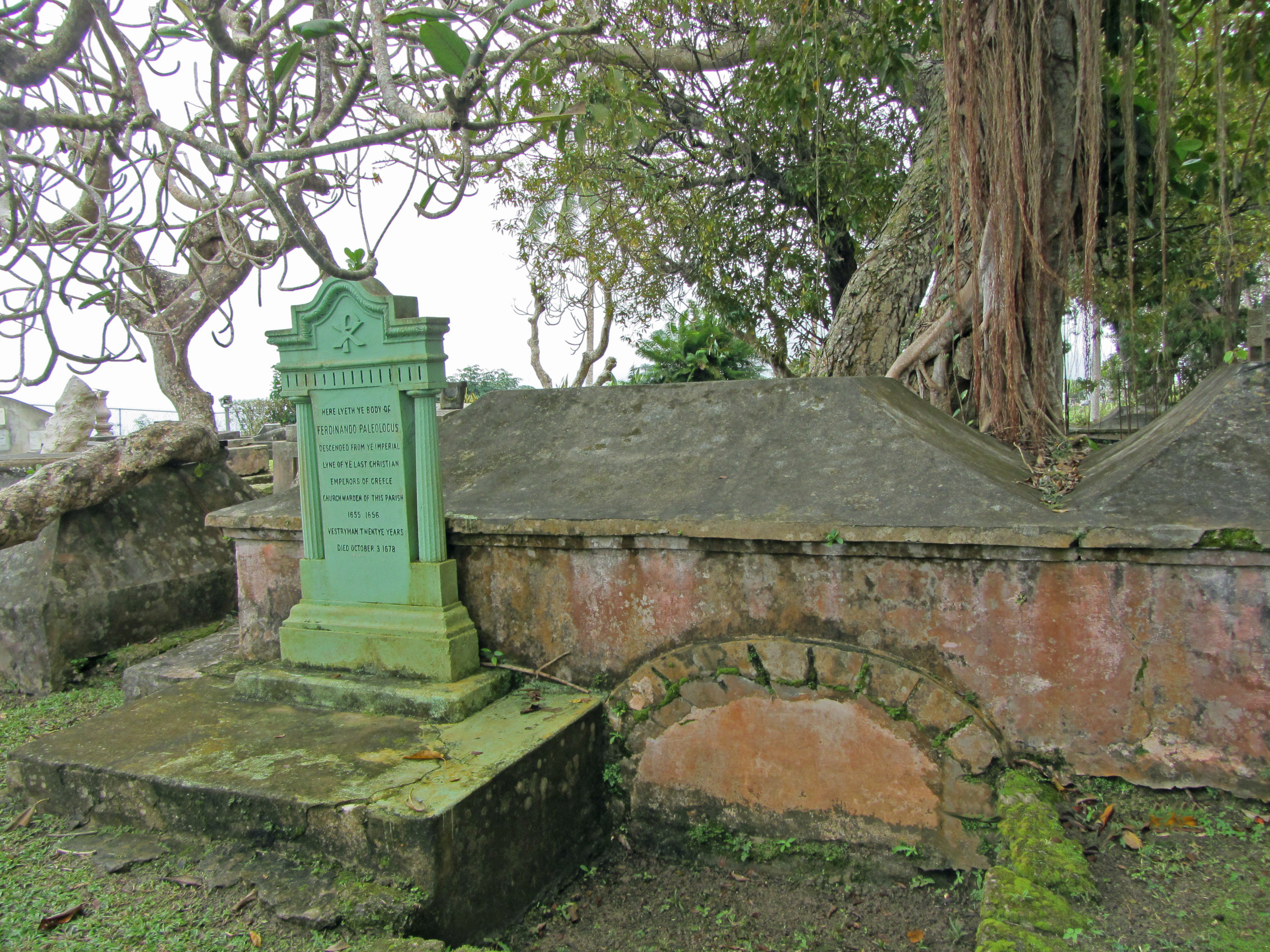
Ferdinand's gravesite and its surroundings in the cemetery of St. John's Parish Church, Barbados

On 13 October 1819, a hurricane swept over Barbados. Among the locations damaged were St John's church and while removing disturbed bodies to new burial sites, the body of Ferdinand was discovered. According to Henry Bradfield, a 19th-century historian of Barbados:

[The body was discovered] in a large leaden coffin, with the feet pointing to the east, the usual mode of burial among the ancient Greeks. On opening the coffin, which was partially destroyed from the action of the air on the metal, it was found to contain the perfect skeleton, which impressed all present with the idea that he must have been a man of extraordinary stature, and this, as a local ontogenarian observed, was known traditionally to have been the Greek prince from Cornwall.

The lead coffin was opened a second time, on 3 May 1844, to "test the truth of the tradition", wherein Ferdinand's skeleton was again found to have been of exceptional size and imbedded in quicklime, sometimes used in burials to speed up the disintegration of corpses if there was fear that a disease might spread. The body being buried with the feet pointing to the east is, despite local legend and the writings of historians on Barbados, not a strange Greek custom but the common practice for burials in England.

Ferdinand's gravesite is used for publicity on Barbados today, with holiday brochures referring to the monument there as "one of the oldest on Barbados" and visitors to St John's church immediately being confronted with signs pointing to it. The monument is recent however, erected in 1906, and since Ferdinand's body was moved in the 20th century, it marks his current burial site, not the original 1670 site. The monument's text, clearly based on the text on the tombstone of his father in Cornwall, reads:

Here lyeth ye body of Ferdinando Paleolocus, descended from ye Imperial lyne of ye last Christian Emperors of Greece
Churchwarden of this parish 1655 1656
Vestryman twentye years
Died October 3 1678

=== In popular culture and memory ===
If Ferdinand and his father were genuine members of the Palaiologos family, Ferdinand was one of the last living members of the dynasty. Ferdinand was only survived by his son, Theodore, who in turn was only survived by his daughter, Godscall, who disappeared from history. Local tradition has it that the provisional government in Athens sent a letter to the authorities on Barbados in the aftermath of the Greek War of Independence (1821–1829), inquiring if a living branch of the Palaiologos dynasty still lived on the island. The letter supposedly requested that if that was the case, the head of the family should be provided with the means of returning to Greece, with the trip paid for by the Greek government. With Ferdinand's last known living descendants dead or missing in the 17th century, it was ascertained that there were no living Palaiologoi on Barbados.

Patrick Leigh Fermor's The Traveller's Tree: A Journey Through the Caribbean Islands (1950) briefly mentions the fate of Ferdinand and his family, stating the following:

Such then, was the destiny that scattered the bones of those exiled princes in Tuscany, Cornwall, London, Barbados, Wapping, and Corunna; a strange and rather inappropriate story. And rather sad. For nothing, after all, could be more remote in distance, or in feeling more alien to this little coral island, than the waters of the Golden Horn: waters that once reflected the vanished palace of Blachernae, the home of the purple-born; or the cypresses of Mystra, whose Byzantine parapets look down from the Taygetus towards the plain of Sparta and the wide valley where the Eurotas meanders through the olive groves of Lacedaemon to the mountains of the Peloponnese.

In 1958, Ferdinand's tombstone caught the eye of the Cuban author Alejo Carpentier, who that same year published an article on supposed sightings of Ferdinand's ghost on Barbados. Ferdinand's grave appears in Carpentier's novel Explosion in a Cathedral (1962), which explores the impact of the French Revolution on the Americas. Carpentier's novel centers on siblings Sofia and Carlos, and their cousin Esteban, who live in an old mansion in Havana. One evening around 1790, the French merchant and adventurer Victor Hugues enters their mansion and tells the main characters of the various wonders and sights he has come across on his travels, notably "on Barbados, the tomb of a nephew of Constantine XI, the last emperor of Byzantium, whose ghost appears on stormy nights to solitary wanderers".

Ferdinand's son Theodore is a central figure in a series of novels by British author Jane Stevenson. In The Pretender (2002), Theodore is called Lieutenant Theodore Paleologue and is described as the son of "Sir Ferdinando", living in Restoration England. In the novel, Theodore's parents are depicted as particularly lenient slave owners.
