= John Palaiologos =

John Palaiologos or Palaeologus (Greek: Ἱωάννης Παλαιολόγος) may refer to:

- John Palaiologos (brother of Michael VIII) (1225/30–1274), general, brother of Byzantine emperor Michael VIII
- John Palaiologos (son of Andronikos II) (1286–1307), governor of Thessalonica
- John Palaiologos (Caesar) (1288/89–1326), governor of Thessalonica
- John II, Marquess of Montferrat (1321–1372), Marquess of Montferrat in 1338–1372
- John V Palaiologos (1332–1391), Byzantine emperor in 1341–1391, with interruptions
- John III, Marquess of Montferrat (c. 1362–1381), Marquess of Montferrat in 1378–1381
- John VII Palaiologos (1370–1408), Byzantine emperor in 1390
- John VIII Palaiologos (1392–1448), Byzantine emperor in 1425–1448
- John IV, Marquess of Montferrat (1413–1464), Marquess of Montferrat in 1445–1464
- John Theodore Paleologus (1611–???), possibly a descendant of Thomas Palaiologos, Despot of the Morea
