= Theodore Paleologus (Junior) =

17th-century English nobleman and soldier

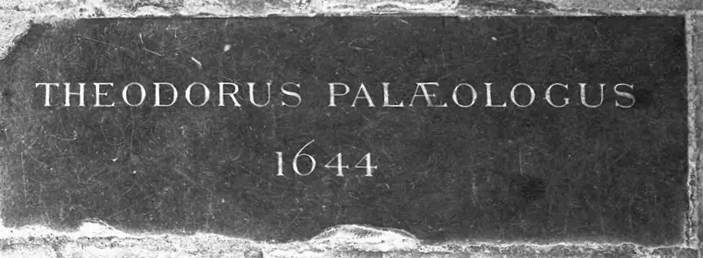
- Tombstone of Theodore Junior in Westminster Abbey
- Born: April 1609; Tattershall, Lincolnshire, England
- Died: April/May 1644 (aged 35); Oxford, Oxfordshire, England
- Buried: Westminster Abbey, London, England
- Noble family: Paleologus
- Father: Theodore Paleologus
- Mother: Mary Balls
- Occupation: Soldier, Roundhead

Theodore Paleologus (Italian: Teodoro Paleologo; April 1609 – April/May 1644), usually distinguished from his father of the same name by modern historians through being referred to as Theodore Junior or Theodore II, was the second son of the 16th/17th-century soldier and assassin Theodore Paleologus, and the oldest son to reach adulthood. Through his father, he was possibly a descendant of the Palaiologos dynasty of Byzantine emperors.

Like his father, Theodore Junior was a professional soldier, first attested in this capacity when he was serving in the forces led by Algernon Percy, the Earl of Northumberland, in the Bishops' Wars in 1640. At the outbreak of the English Civil War (1642–1651), Theodore sided with the Roundheads (Parliamentarians), despite his two brothers and his friend Richard Grenville being Cavaliers (royalists). Theodore did not survive the war, dying in 1644, probably of camp fever during the early stages of the Siege of Oxford. He was buried in Westminster Abbey, where his grave was one of the few Parliamentarian graves to survive unscathed after the English monarchy was restored in 1660.

== Biography ==
Theodore Paleologus was the oldest surviving son of his father by the same name and Mary Balls. He was baptised on 30 April 1609 (meaning he was probably born that month). Theodore's family might have been the last living members of the Palaiologos dynasty, which ruled the Byzantine Empire from 1259 to 1453. They claimed descent from Thomas Palaiologos, a brother of the last Byzantine emperor, Constantine XI Palaiologos, through a son called John, whose existence cannot be confirmed through contemporary sources. All other purported ancestors (descendants of this John) of the later Paleologus family can be verified through contemporary records. On account of the absence of evidence for John's existence, the English Byzantininst Donald Nicol wrote in 1974 that the family's claim to descend from Thomas "must be held unproven". John Hall, the author of a 2015 biography on Theodore Junior's father, believes that it would be wrong to dismiss their descent on account of a single missing link.

In his youth, Theodore Junior lived with his father and his siblings at Tattershall in Lincolnshire, England, where his father served as Master of the Horse for the Early Henry Clinton; the modern historian John Hall describes Clinton as one of the most hated and feared noblemen in all of England at the time. When Clinton died in 1616 and their father left Lincolnshire, possibly being evicted by the new Earl (Thomas Clinton), the whereabouts of the children are unknown. What likely transpired was that the children were placed in the service of some household of higher class, a common practice in regards to adolescents at the time. It is also possible that the family lived with Mary's relatives, the Balls family.

In 1619, Theodore Junior's parents are known to have lived in Plymouth and a legal paper confidently place Theodore Junior in the city as well, at least as early as 1623. By 1628, Theodore Junior, aged nineteen, was again away from his family, making his own life elsewhere. He is next attested in 1631, the same year his mother died, as a witness in a lawsuit against Richard Grenville. Theodore was apparently a friend of Grenville, described in court papers as "Theodore Palaeologus of Tavistock, gent, aged twentyone, who gave evidence that he had been present on 1 April the previous year when Sir Richard paid over money to redeem some jewels pawned by his wife Dame Mary". According to Theodore himself, he had known Grenville since 1623 and as he had been fourteen in 1623, the Grenvilles were likely the family he had served in his adolescence.

Theodore is next attested in 1640 (aged 31) as a lieutenant of the army led by Algernon Percy, the Earl of Northumberland, against the Scots in the Bishops' Wars. Serving in this army, he would have met Grenville again as both are listed as lieutenants in Percy's army. The campaign against the Scots ended in defeat and Theodore is then listed, in the same year, as present in the regiment of Jacob Astley at Yorkshire.

In 1642 the English Civil War erupted, forcing nobles across the country to choose either to fight for the royalists (Cavaliers) or the Parliamentarians (Roundheads). Even though Grenville and both of Theodore's brothers, John Theodore and Ferdinand, were Cavaliers, Theodore sided with the rebels. By June 1642, his name was on the Reformado List, Parliament's list of officers who were entitled to be paid half their wage even when not employed. Soon after, a "Theo Paholigus" (a misspelling of Theodore's name) is listed as a captain lieutenant in a foot regiment raised in Oxford by Oliver St John, 5th Baron St John of Bletso.

Theodore did not survive the war, dying in 1644, aged 35, by then having the rank of lieutenant colonel. Although his cause, time and place of death is unknown, by tracking the movements of his company, it can be assumed that he died of camp fever during the early stages of the long Siege of Oxford. He was buried in the St. Michael's Chapel in Westminster Abbey, a distinguished burial site, on 3 May 1644. The honorable burial probably had little to do with Theodore's imperial ancestry, instead being the result of his service to the Parliamentarian cause and possibly also because of the influence of Theodore's commanders.

== Legacy ==
Many Parliamentarian graves in Westminster Abbey were exhumed on the orders of Charles II after the restoration of the monarchy in 1660, with the corpses suffering symbolic executions and their heads being impaled on spikes. Theodore's grave was one of only seven Parliamentarian graves spared this fate, but whether it was because he was a simple soldier or because his grave was unmarked at the time is unknown. The present marker for his grave was laid down by Arthur Penrhyn Stanley in the 19th century. In his 2004 book on Westminster Abbey, historian Richard Jenkyns wrote that "those inclined to Romantic fantasy may toy with the notion that the Abbey also contains a rightful Emperor of Byzantium, the heir of Augustus and Constantine: that is, the Palaeologi were the last Byzantine dynasty, and a floor slab in the north transept records 'Theodorus Palaeologus 1644' ".
