= Cargreen =

Settlement in Cornwall, England

Coordinates: 50.4418°N 4.2068°W

Cargreen: Cornish: Karrekreun
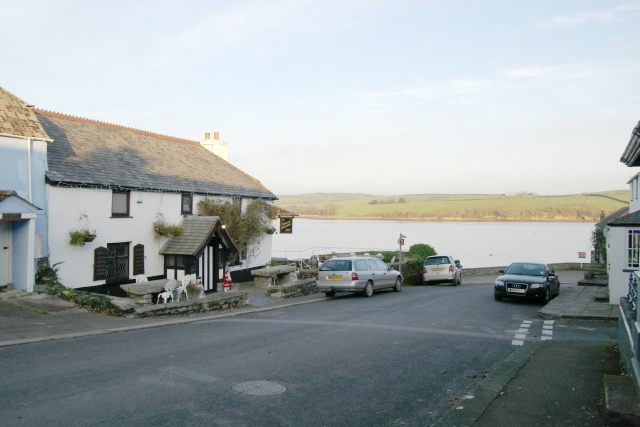

- Location within Cornwall
- OS grid reference: SX433625
- Civil parish: Landulph
- Unitary authority: Cornwall
- Ceremonial county: Cornwall
- Region: South West
- Country: England
- Sovereign state: United Kingdom
- Post town: SALTASH
- Postcode district: PL12
- Dialling code: 01752
- Police: Devon and Cornwall
- Fire: Cornwall
- Ambulance: South Western
- UK Parliament: South East Cornwall

Cargreen (Cornish: Karrekreun) is a small settlement in southeast Cornwall, England, United Kingdom. It is situated beside the River Tamar approximately two miles (3 km) north of Saltash. It is in the civil parish of Landulph.

Burgee of Cargreen Yacht Club, established in 1972

Cargreen has a yacht club and once had a thriving industry ferrying flowers across the river to Devon.

"The earliest known reference to Cargreen was in 1018 when the bounds of the manor of Tinnel mentioned "Carrecron". It was then probably no more than, as the name implies (in Cornish), an outbreak of hard rock jutting into the Tamar."

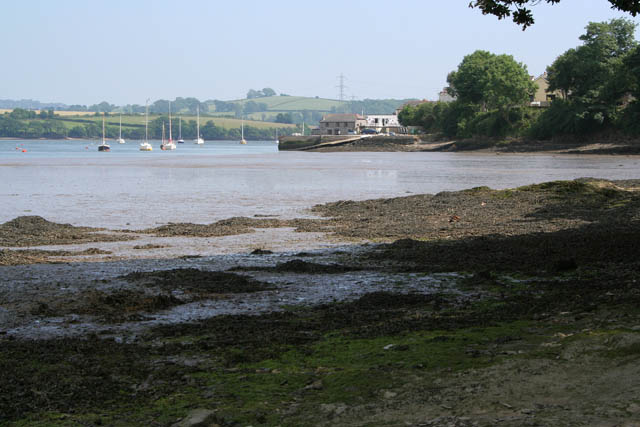
The River Tamar at Cargreen

Cargreen is mentioned in John Leland's The Antiquary 1534-43: "Myles fro Asshe [Saltash] Northward ynto the Land is a smaul Village cawled Caregrin, Est of this is Bere Parke and Hous in Devonshire dividid from Caregrin tantum Tamara."

The BBC TV series The Coroner features the now-closed Crooked Spaniards Inn, shown on the right, as the set for The Black Dog Inn. As of 2021, the pub remains closed although its surrounding buildings have been converted into holiday accommodation.
