= John Paleologus =

17th-century English nobleman

- Born: June/July 1611; Tattershall, Lincolnshire, England
- Died: After 1644
- Noble family: Paleologus
- Father: Theodore Paleologus
- Mother: Mary Balls
- Occupation: Soldier, Cavalier

John Paleologus (Italian: Giovanni Paleologo; June/July 1611 – after 1644), full name John Theodore Paleologus, was the third son of the 16th/17th-century soldier and assassin Theodore Paleologus and, through his father, possibly a descendant of the Palaiologos dynasty of Byzantine emperors.

Of Theodore's three sons to survive until adulthood (including John's brothers Theodore Junior and Ferdinand), John is the most enigmatic and his ultimate fate is uncertain. He probably sided with the Royalists, or Cavaliers, in the English Civil War (1642–1651), as Ferdinand did, and is known to have accompanied Ferdinand to Barbados, where both of them are attested in 1644. No later records of John, either in Barbados or back home in England, are known. He is popularly believed to have died at the Battle of Naseby in 1645, fighting for the Royalists, but there is no evidence that he returned to England. Another possibility is that he stayed in the Caribbean and, as many other disenchanted settlers did, ultimately turned to piracy.

== Biography ==
John Theodore Paleologus was the second eldest surviving son of Theodore Paleologus and his wife Mary Balls, baptised on 11 July 1611 (meaning he was probably born in late June or early July). John's family might have been the last living members of the Palaiologos dynasty, which ruled the Byzantine Empire from 1259 to 1453. They claimed descent from Thomas Palaiologos, a brother of Emperor Constantine XI Palaiologos, through a son called John, whose existence can not be confirmed through contemporary sources. All other purported ancestors (descendants of this John) of the later Paleologus family can be verified through contemporary records. On account of the absence of evidence for John's existence, English Byzantininst Donald Nicol wrote in 1974 that the family's claim to descend from Thomas "must be held unproven". John Hall, an author of a 2015 biography on Theodore Paleologus, believes that it would be wrong to dismiss their descent on account of a single missing link. None of John's contemporaries doubted the imperial descent of his family. John had two older brothers; Theodore (who died in infancy) and Theodore Junior, a younger brother, Ferdinand, and two older sisters; Dorothy and Mary.

In his youth, John lived with his father and his siblings at Tattershall in Lincolnshire, England, since his father served the hated and feared Earl Henry Clinton as Master of the Horse. When Clinton died in 1616 and their father left Lincolnshire, possibly being evicted by the new Earl (Thomas Clinton), the whereabouts of the children are unknown. What likely transpired was that the children were placed in the service of some household of higher class, a common practice in regard to adolescents at the time. It is also possible that the family lived with Mary's relatives, the Balls family.

From 1619 to 1628, John's parents lived in Plymouth with his sisters and his younger brother Ferdinand, but John was not with them, likely still in service at that point. John is the most enigmatic of the three sons of Theodore. He is popularly believed to have fought on the Royalist side of the English Civil War (1642–1651), like his brother Ferdinand. John appears to have accompanied Ferdinand to Barbados, as the two brothers are recorded together as witnesses of a deed there on 26 June 1644.

== Fate ==
John's ultimate fate is not known. Stories of John sometimes place his death at the Battle of Lansdowne in Somerset in 1643 or the Battle of Naseby in 1645. The Lansdowne claim can be entirely disregarded as false on account of John being attested in Barbados in 1644. After 1644 there are no further records of John either in Barbados or back home in England. There is thus no evidence that John was present at Naseby, but the claim is often repeated by historians. Historian N. Darnell Davis wrote as early as 1887 that "John had fallen at Naseby, fighting under the Royal Banner".

John Hall, author of a 2015 biography on Theodore Paleologus, considers it unlikely that John returned home only to fight and die at the Battle of Naseby, but also notes that the absence of further records of John in Barbados indicates that he did not stay on the island for long. Hall considers it possible that John did not get along well with the locals or failed to garner enough funds to establish himself on the island in the same vein as his brother Ferdinand would go on to do. In the 17th century, many disenchanted settlers left the islands in the Caribbean to venture to the mainland, and many of those who did so eventually turned to piracy. Hall thus speculates that it is possible that John eventually became a pirate in the West Indies.
