= Theodore Paleologus =

16th and 17th-century Greek soldier and assassin

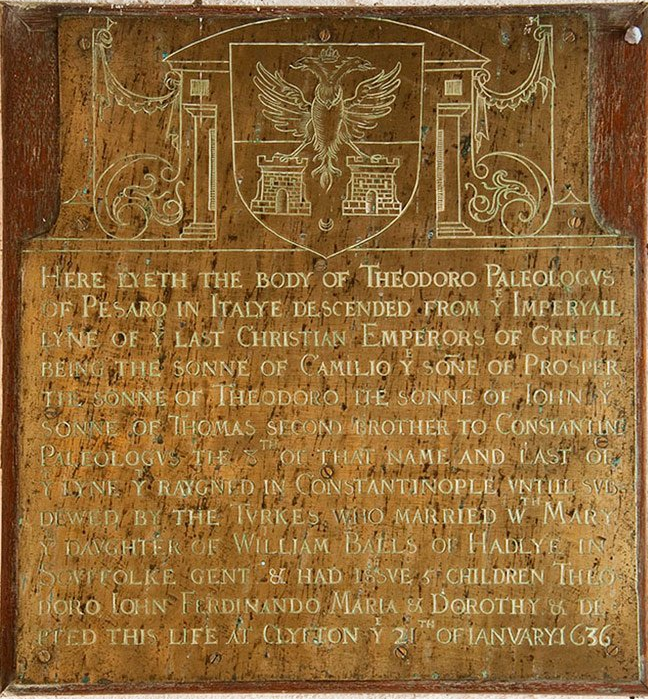
- Tombstone of Theodore Paleologus in Landulph
- Born: c. 1560; Pesaro, Duchy of Urbino
- Died: 21 January 1636 (aged c. 76); Landulph, Cornwall, England
- Buried: St Leonard & St Dilpe; Landulph, Cornwall, England
- Noble family: Paleologus
- Spouse: Mary Balls
- Issue: Dorothy; Mary; Theodore; John; Ferdinand
- Father: Camilio Paleologus
- Mother: Unknown
- Occupation: Soldier, assassin, Master of the Horse

Theodore Paleologus (Italian: Teodoro Paleologo; c. 1560 – 21 January 1636) was a 16th and 17th-century Greek nobleman, soldier and assassin. According to the genealogy presented on Theodore's tombstone, he was a direct male-line descendant of the Palaiologos dynasty, which had ruled the Byzantine Empire from 1259 to its fall in 1453. Though most of the figures in the genealogy can be verified to have been real historical figures, the veracity of his imperial descent is uncertain.

Born in Pesaro around 1560, Theodore was forced into exile after being convicted for the attempted murder of a man called Leone Ramusciatti. He lived in exile for many years and went on to become a proficient soldier and hired assassin. In 1597, Theodore arrived in London, hired by the authorities of the Republic of Lucca to kill a man named Alessandro Antelminelli. After failing to track down Antelminelli, Theodore stayed in England, possibly for the rest of his life.

In 1600, Theodore was hired by Henry Clinton, the Earl of Lincoln, ostensibly as "Master of the Horse" but in reality probably as a henchman and assassin. At the time, Clinton was perhaps the most hated nobleman in the entire country. Theodore probably accompanied Clinton on his visits around the country, most of them having to do with Clinton's frequent battles with the law. In Clinton's service, Theodore also met the famous captain and explorer John Smith, whom he gradually helped introduce back into society after Smith had elected to live as a recluse.

While living in Plymouth in 1628, Theodore was offered employment by the Duke of Buckingham, George Villiers, almost as hated as the now deceased Earl of Lincoln, but Villiers was assassinated soon thereafter. Theodore was then invited by a Sir Nicholas Lower to stay with him at his house, Clifton Hall, in Landulph, Cornwall. There, Theodore lived until his death in 1636. He was buried at Landulph and was survived by five of the six or seven children whom he had with his wife, Mary Balls. Of these children, only Ferdinand Paleologus, who later emigrated to Barbados, is known to have had children of his own.

== Biography ==
=== Early life ===
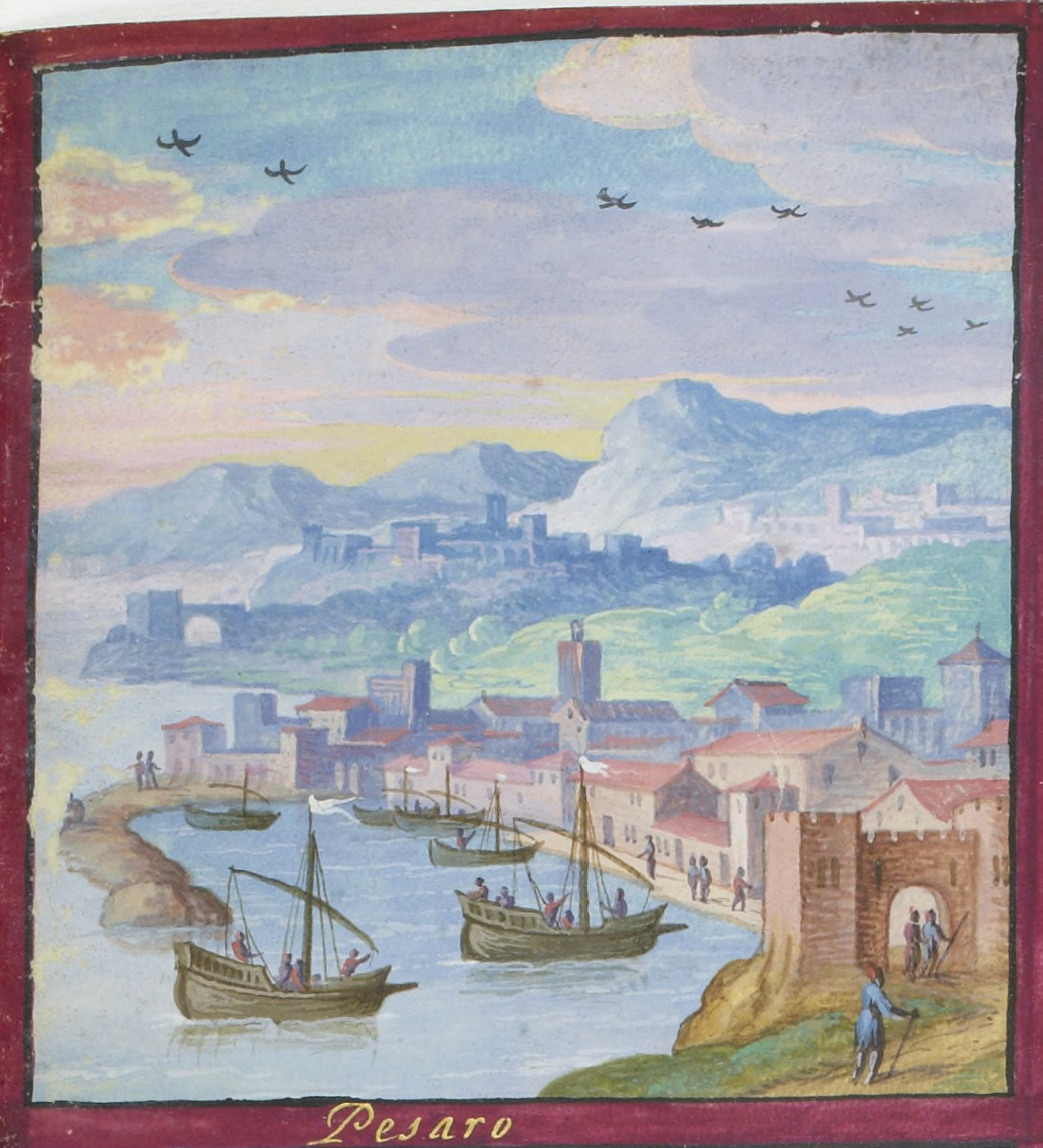
Miniature painting depicting Pesaro in 1578, the same year that Theodore was exiled from the town

Born in Pesaro in the north central east coast of Italy around 1560, Theodore Paleologus was the son of Camilio Paleologus, about whom very little is known. The name of his mother is not known. Theodore's family might have been late-surviving descendants of the Palaiologos dynasty, which ruled the Byzantine Empire from 1259 to 1453. They claimed descent from Thomas Palaiologos (Camilio being Thomas's supposed great-great-grandson), a brother of the final emperor Constantine XI Palaiologos, through a son called John, whose existence can not be confirmed through contemporary sources. All other purported ancestors (descendants of this John) of the later Paleologus family can be verified through contemporary records. On account of the absence of evidence for John's existence, English Byzantininst Donald Nicol wrote in 1974 that "Theodore’s claim to be a descendant of Thomas Palaiologos [...] must be held unproven". John Hall, author of a 2015 biography on Theodore, believes that it would be wrong to "dismiss Theodore's claim out of hand" on account of a single missing link.

During his early life, Theodore lived with his two uncles, Camilio's brothers, Scipione and Leonidas Paleologus, in Pesaro. In 1578, the three found themselves embroiled in a scandal, as they were convicted for the attempted murder of Leone Ramusciatti, a man who was also of Greek descent. After failing to kill him, in an attempt to avoid arrest, they barricaded themselves in a church. Contemporary records from Pesaro refers to the three as a something akin to a gang, and alludes to a previous (successful) murder committed by them. The fate of Scipione is unknown, but Leonidas was executed. Theodore, who is referred to as a minor (though he was obviously old enough to partake in the crime, probably 16–18 years old) was spared the death penalty and instead banished not only from Pesaro, but from the entire Duchy of Urbino.

=== Career as an assassin ===
Theodore is not attested again until nineteen years later, upon his arrival to England in 1597. If Theodore's own later account is to be believed, some of the time in exile was spent fighting for the Protestants in the Netherlands, alongside the famous general Maurice of Nassau, as part of the Dutch Revolt. Theodore arrived in England as an assassin, hired to track down and kill Alessandro Antelminelli, a 25-year old citizen of the Republic of Lucca in Italy. Antelminelli's father and three brothers had been captured, tortured and executed in Lucca on charges of treason one year prior. Though Antelminelli had been absent during the time of the supposed crime, he had nonetheless been summoned to stand trial for his supposed complicity. Understanding that being at the trial would mean certain execution, he had instead fled to England and assumed the alias of "Ambergio Salvetti", claiming to be from Florence. As "Salvetti", Antelminelli became a comrade of the diplomat and poet Henry Wotton.

Around 40 years old, Theodore was by this point in time evidently well-established as an assassin. At some point between 1578 and 1597, he had been pardoned at Pesaro and had been allowed to return to his hometown, as proven by a letter addressed to "Signor Teodoro Paleologo" in Pesaro, dated 1597. The tone of this letter, signed by the senior magistrate of Lucca, Francesco Andreotti, speaks to Theodore's apparently impressive reputation:

Very Magnificent Signor
I have heard with much pleasure that you keep me in your remembrance as I do you, and to show my confidence in you I take the opportunity of employing you in my affairs. By the bearer of this you will be informed what it is that I require, and I beg and request that you will place entire confidence in him. I on my part shall not be ungrateful for besides the usual reward of your work I think of securing you a pension.

The authorities at Lucca had first hired another assassin to kill Antelminelli, Marcantonio Franceotti. Franceotti had been paid 200 pounds in advance, but had failed to track down Antelminelli and suggested that the authorities at Lucca commission a "more seasoned killer". Franceotti recommended Paleologus, and is probably the same person as the one who personally delivered the Lucchese message ("the bearer of this" referred to in the letter). Like Franceotti before him, Paleologus also failed to find and kill Antelminelli. Despite further attempts to kill him until at least 1627, Antelminelli eventually died of natural causes in 1657.

=== In the service of the Earl of Lincoln ===
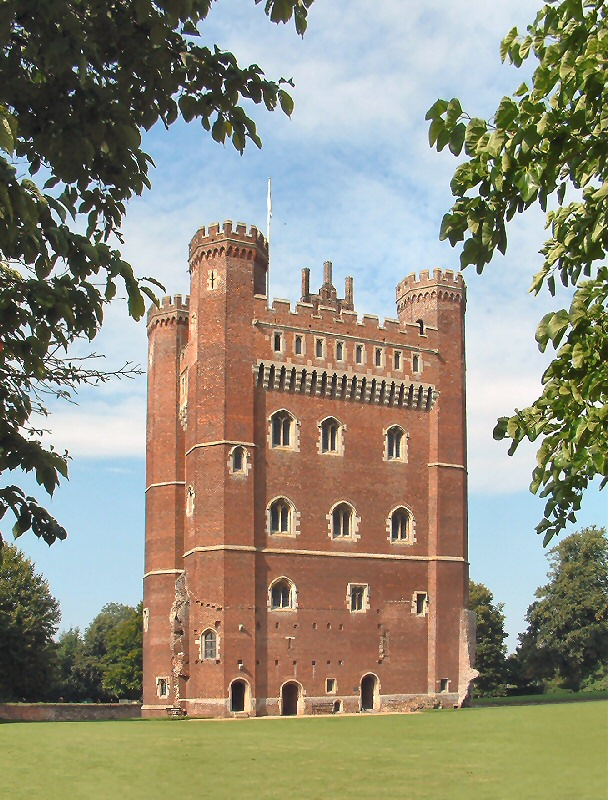
Tattershall Castle, the seat of the Earl of Lincoln and Theodore's home for many years in the service of the feared and hated Earl Henry Clinton

After failing to track down Antelminelli, Theodore chose to stay in England. To earn money, he entered into the service of Henry Clinton, the Earl of Lincoln, in 1599. Theodore would spend many years living at Clinton's castle, Tattershall Castle in Lincolnshire. The castle had once been denounced by King Henry VIII as "one of the most brutal and beastly [castles] of the whole realm" and the town it overlooked, also called Tattershall, was scarcely more than a village at this point in time, having suffered a drastic depopulation in the late 16th century. Henry Clinton was almost sixty years old and one of the most brutal, feared and hated feudal lords in Britain. Clinton is frequently described as waging war on his neighbors and is often credited with rioting, abduction, arson, sabotage, extortion and perjury. At one point, Clinton even expanded his castle walls into the nearby churchyard.

Clinton officially hired Theodore as his Master of the Horse, but he clearly had intended uses for Theodore beyond the Italian's skills with horses, and presumably knew of Theodore's previous work. It is thus likely that Clinton's real intended use for Theodore was as a soldier and assassin. Theodore himself probably entered Clinton's service due to his advancing age, hoping to find a safer and more stable profession than his many years as a hired killer. Clinton was often at London due to his frequent entanglements with the law, during which Theodore, as Master of the Horse, would likely have accompanied and escorted him.

While staying at Tattershall, Theodore met his future wife, Mary Balls. Mary had been born in Hadleigh, Suffolk c. 1575 (she is known to have been 24 years old in 1599) and had no known friends or family outside that town, making her sudden appearance at Tattershall in 1599 somewhat puzzling. The only certain previous link between her family and Tattershall is her father, William Balls, being recorded as a witness to a legal document in Tattershall in 1585. William might thus have been known at the Tattershall household in some capacity.

Mary conceived Theodore's first child c. September 1599, and she married him in Cottingham, East Yorkshire on 1 May 1600, at which point she was several months pregnant. It is possible that the reason for the wedding being so late, only six weeks before the birth of their child, was Theodore accompanying Clinton on one of his law-related trips to London. The ceremony took place in the Church of St. Mary in Cottingham, where the marriage register records the marriage of Thedorus Palelogu and Maria Balle. The couple might have chosen to marry at Cottingham, nearly seventy miles away from Tattershall, due to Cottingham being under the rule of the Duke of Suffolk, Clinton's feudal superior. Because of the relation between the duke and the earl, the priest in Cottingham might have avoided asking awkward questions in regards to Mary's pregnancy. Their first child, named Theodore, was baptised on 12 June but died an infant on 1 September.

During their time in Lincolnshire, Theodore and Mary had further children. Baptismal records at Tattershall confirms the baptisms of three of their five, possibly six, later children. On 18 August 1606, their daughter Dorothy (identified in the records as "Dorathie, daughter of Theodore Palalogo") was baptised, followed by Theodore Junior ("Theodore Palalogo, son of Theodore Palalogo") on 30 April 1609 and John Theodore ("John Theodore, son of Paleologo Theodore) on 11 July 1611. There is also a partially legible entry for "Elizabeth, daughter of Theo ..." from August 1614, likely another child of Theodore. Since no further records are known of this Elizabeth, she is likely to have died in infancy.

On 14 May 1600, Francis Norreys, the son of Clinton's wife Elizabeth Morrison by a previous marriage, wrote to the Secretary of State, Robert Cecil, in the hope that he would intervene in Clinton's affairs, since Clinton had recently ordered that Elizabeth be confined to Tatershall Castle. The letter references an "Italian murderer", likely Theodore. With Clinton pressured to release her as more and more letters describing her situation came in to Cecil, Elizabeth was released later that year. A passage of Norreys's message reads:

He keeps her docked up like a prisoner, without suffering her either to write or hear from any of her friends, having appointed to guard her an Italian, a man that hath done divers murders in Italy and in the Low Countries, from which he fled to England, from whom, I protest, she has just cause hourly to fear the cutting of her throat.

During his time at Tattershall, Theodore also met and befriended John Smith (later a famous captain and explorer in the Americas). After Smith had served as a soldier in the Netherlands, he had returned home to Lincolnshire in 1600 and, tiring of the company of the locals, lived as a recluse, constructing a small wooden house a decent distance away from any major town or village. In his own writings, Smith describes how he was befriended by a “Thaedora Polalaga, Rider to Henry Earle of Lincolne” and describes the man as an “excellent horseman” and a “noble Italian gentleman”. Theodore taught Smith Italian and skill at arms, and might have encouraged him to return to the battlefield. In Philip L. Barbour's The Three Worlds of Captain John Smith (1964), Theodore is thought to be the culprit behind filling "John Smith's fancies with further adventurous notions" through legends of the Ottoman Turks. In Dorothy and Thomas Hoobler's Captain John Smith (2006), Theodore is credited with "igniting the spirit of the Crusaders" in Smith. Smith would later partake in military campaigns against the Ottomans before his more famous ventures in the Americas (such as the establishment of Jamestown, Virginia and his encounter with Pocahontas).

=== Later years ===
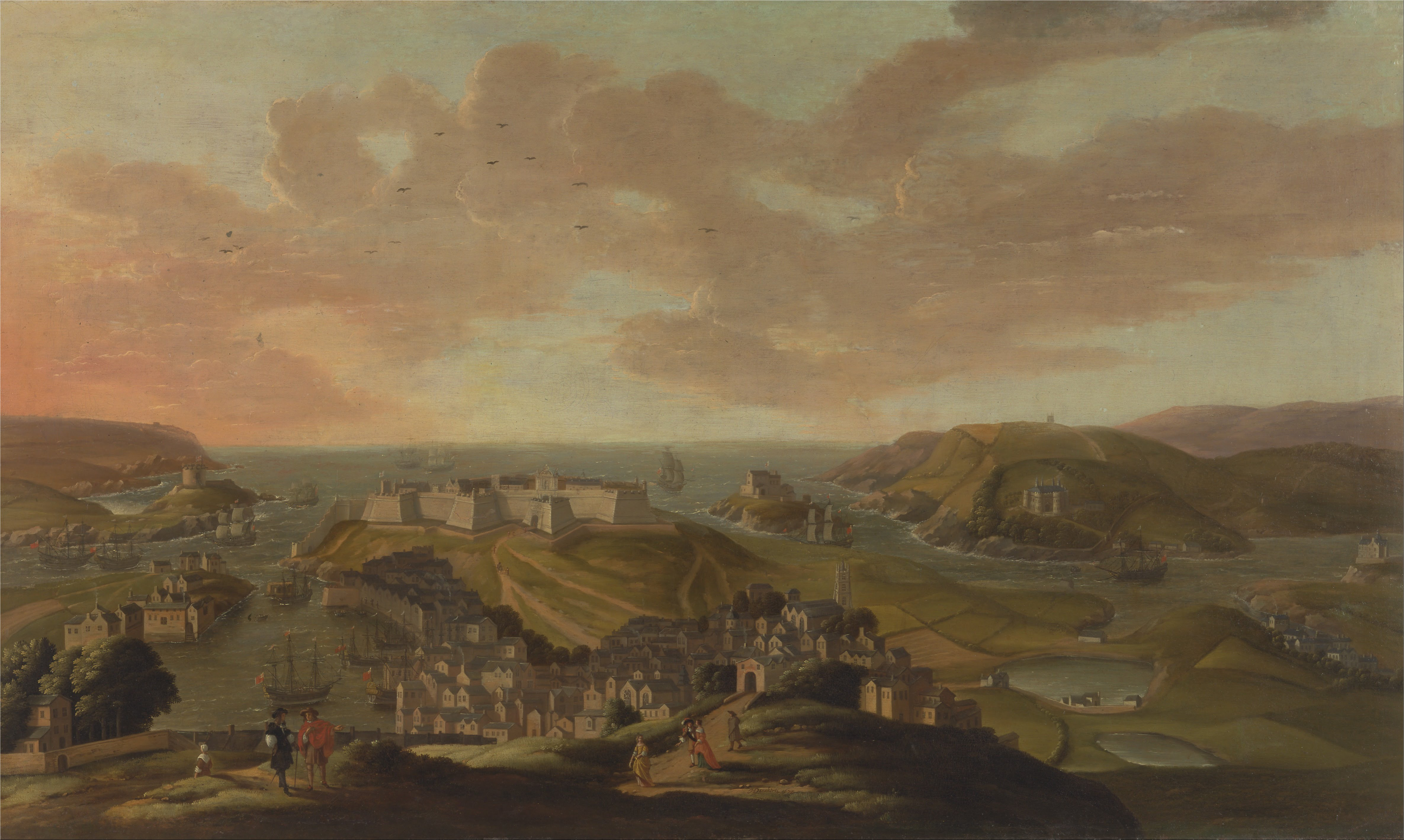
Plymouth, as painted by Dutch painter Hendrik Danckerts in 1673, 45 years after Theodore left the city

Clinton died on 29 September 1616. After Clinton's death, there are no further records of Theodore at Tattershall, or anywhere else for several years. It is possible that he was quickly evicted by Clinton's son and successor, Thomas Clinton. It is possible that the family lived with Mary's relatives, the Balls family, during this time or that the children were placed in the service of some higher class household, a common practice in regards to adolescents. Another possibility is that Theodore spent much of the time between 1609 and 1621 fighting in the Netherlands during the Eighty Years' War.

Theodore is attested as living in Plymouth from 1619 onwards. On 15 June 1619, a fourth son, Ferdinand, was baptised at the Church of St. Andrew in Plymouth, the event being recorded in the baptismal register as the baptism of "Ffardinando son of Theodore Paleologus an Ittalian". The rest of his family was with him at Plymouth, with a document confidently placing Theodore Junior there at least as early as 1623. Theodore was a householder (landlord) in Plymouth, rated in 1628 at a halfpenny a week. That same year, Theodore, now in his mid-sixties, offered his services to the Duke of Buckingham, George Villiers. On account of corruption, enormous wealth and incompetence (for instance having supported unsuccessful wars with France and Spain), as well as interference with the politics of King Charles I, Villiers was, like Henry Clinton before him, one of the most hated men in all of England. Though the unmarried daughters Dorothy and Mary, and the young Ferdinand, probably lived with Theodore and Mary, the older sons were not at home in 1628, with Theodore Junior, aged 19, making his own life elsewhere and John Theodore probably still being in service.

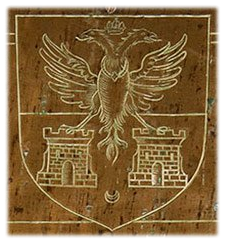
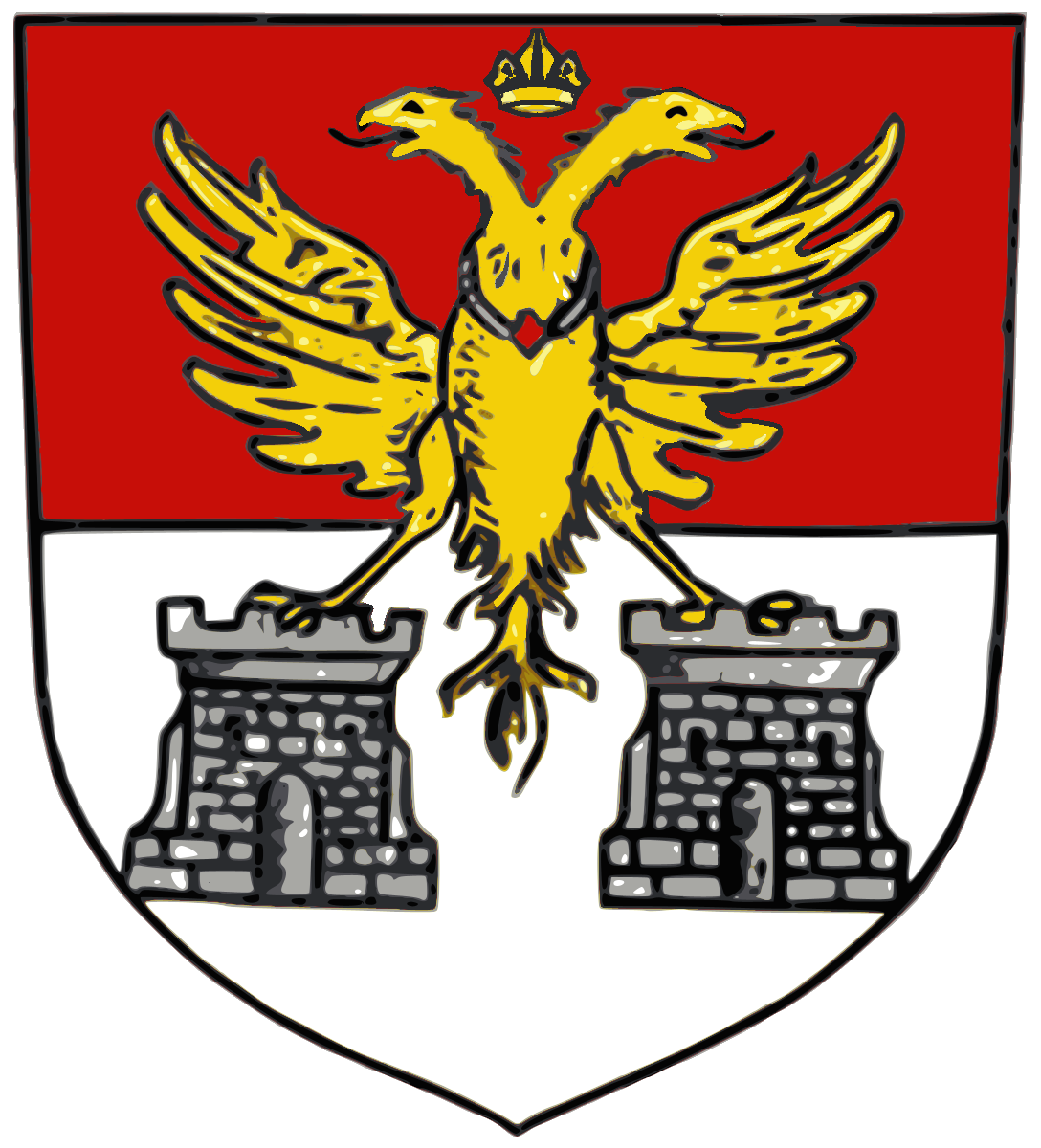
Theodore's coat of arms, as presented on the brass plaque marking his grave in Landulph (left) and a colour reconstruction of the arms (right). The crescent at the bottom of the arms on the tombstone (which heraldically marks a second son) might have mistakenly been added after Theodore's death.

In Theodore's letter to Villiers, he describes himself as "capable as one who has lived and shed his blood in war since his youth, at the pleasure of the late Prince of Orange, and other diverse English and French lords who have seen and known me and can bear witness" and calls himself a gentleman of a good family, worthy of the name he bears on account of his many accomplishments, but "unlucky in the misfortune experienced by my ancestors and myself". Theodore met Villiers in Plymouth and had seemingly been promised a rather generous employment, but on the 23 August that same year, Villiers was assassinated, leaving Theodore once more without an employer.

Shortly thereafter, Theodore was invited by Sir Nicholas Lower, a rich Cornish squire, to join him at his home in Landulph, Cornwall, probably on account of Theodore's supposedly exalted lineage. Lower's home, Clifton Hall, was divided to accommodate two families after Mary and the Paleologus daughters (and probably Ferdinand) moved in shortly after Theodore. At Clifton Hall, Theodore probably served the Lowers as a scholar of history and the Greek language, possibly helping to educate their children.

Theodore stayed with his family and the Lowers at Clifton Hall for the rest of his life. His wife, Mary Balls, was buried in Plymouth on 24 November 1631 and would have been 56 years old at the time of her death. As per the brass plaque which marks his grave in the Church of St Leonard & St Dilpe in Landulph, Theodore died on 21 January 1636. The brass plaque prominently displays a coat of arms reminiscent of that of the Palaiologos emperors of Byzantium, displaying the imperial double-headed eagle. According to the registers at Landulph, Theodore was buried on 20 October 1636, but this is probably an error since it seems unlikely that his body remained unburied for nine months.

The inscription of Theodore's tombstone reads:

Here lyeth the Body of Theodoro Paleologus of Pesaro in Italye descended from ye imperiall lyne of ye last Christian Emperors of Greece, being the sonne of Camilio, the sonne of Prosper, the sonne of Theodoro, the sonne of John, the sonne of Thomas, second brother to Constantine Paleologus, the 8th of that name and last of ye lyne yt raygned in Constantinople untill [sic] subdewed by the Turkes, who married with Mary ye Daughter of William Balls of Hadlye in Souffolke, Gent., and had issue 5 children, Theodore, John, Ferdinando, Maria, Dorothy, and departed this life at Clyfton ye 21st of January, 1636.

== Family and children ==
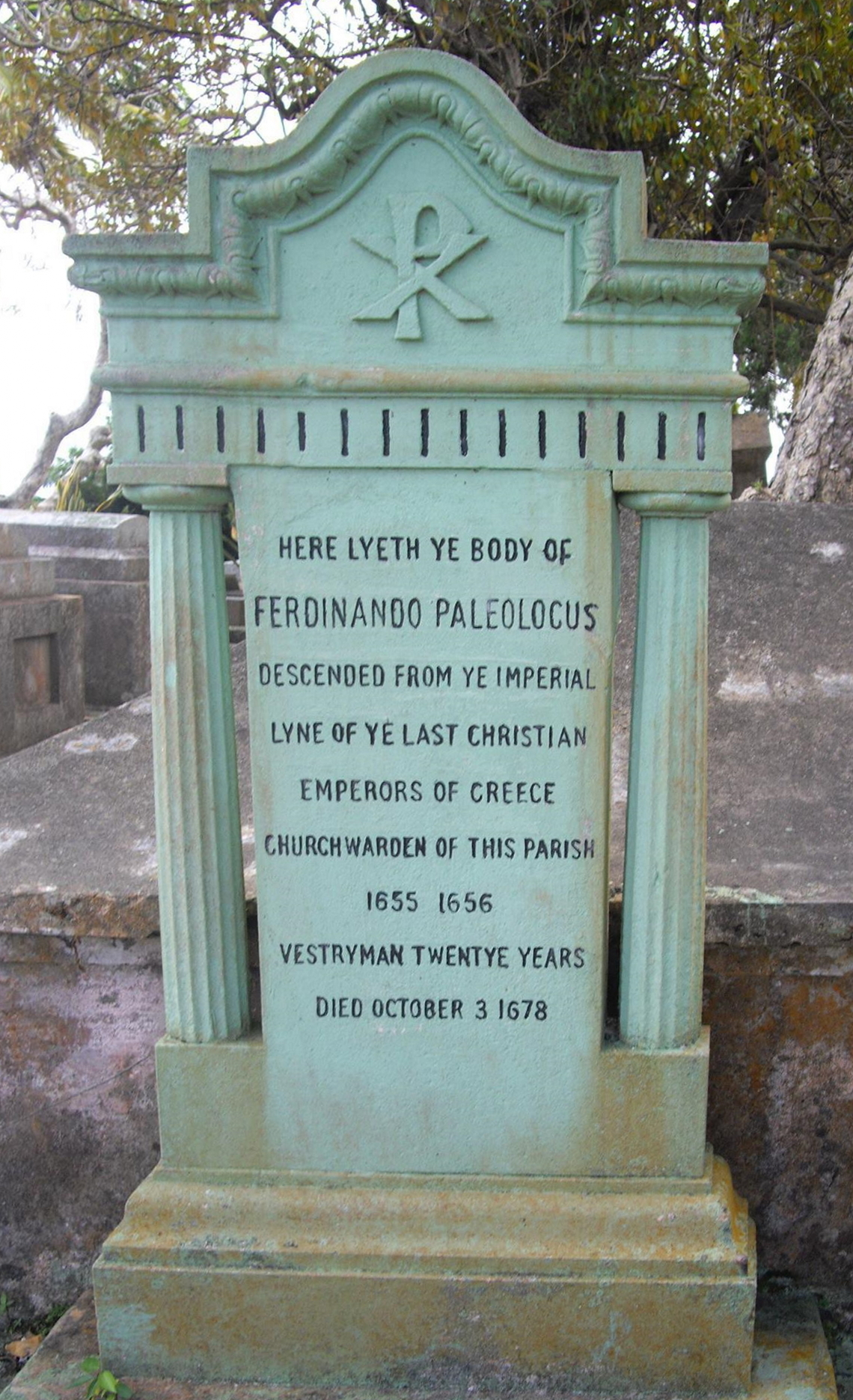
1906 monument erected near the grave of Theodore's son Ferdinand Paleologus on Barbados

With his wife Mary, Theodore had six, possibly seven, children:

- Theodore Paleologus (June – 1 September 1600) – Theodore and Mary's first child, died in infancy.
- Dorothy Paleologus (August 1606 – 1681) – Remained in Landulph after Theodore's death. Dorothy married William Arundel, son or grandson of Alexander Arundel, who Nicholas Lower had purchased Clifton Hall from. The entries recording the marriage in the marriage registers at Landulph and at William's home parish of St Mellion grandly describe Dorothy as of "imperial stock" (Dorothea Paleologus de stirpe imperatorum). Since the registers at St. Dominic were accidentally destroyed, it is impossible to determine whether Dorothy and William had children, but it is unlikely since Dorothy was fifty years old by the time of the marriage. Dorothy was buried in Landulph in 1681.
- Mary Paleologus (? – 1674) – Remained in Landulph after Theodore's death. Very little is known of Mary and she is the only one of the children whose birth year is unknown. She was probably never married and was buried in Landulph on 15 May 1674.
- Theodore Paleologus (April 1609 – April/May 1644) – The oldest son to reach adulthood, Theodore Junior fought for the Parliamentarians, or Roundheads, in the English Civil War (1642–1651). He died during the war in 1644, probably of camp fever during the early stages of the siege of Oxford, and was buried in Westminster Abbey.
- John Theodore Paleologus (June/July 1611 – ?) – The most enigmatic of the children, John Theodore is thought to have fought for the Royalists, or Cavaliers, in the English Civil War, but left England before its conclusion, being attested in Barbados with his younger brother Ferdinand in 1644. Nothing is known of John Theodore after 1644 and his ultimate fate is unknown.
- (?) Elizabeth Paleologus (July/August 1614 – ?) – Known only from a partial baptismal record from Tattershall, Elizabeth is likely to have been another of Theodore and Mary's daughters. As she is never referenced again after this baptismal record, it is probable that she died in infancy.
- Ferdinand Paleologus (June 1619 – 2 October 1670) – The youngest son, Ferdinand travelled with John Theodore to Barbados, where he stayed for the rest of his life, becoming one of the elite on the island. He had a son, named Theodore, and was known on Barbados as the "Greek prince from Cornwall". Ferdinand constructed a great house on the island, named Clifton Hall after the house the family had stayed in while in Cornwall.

According to some genealogies, Theodore was married to another woman before Mary. This previous marriage would have taken place on 6 July 1593 on the island Chios, his bride being "Eudoxia Comnena", a daughter of the nobleman Alexius Comnenus and his wife Helen Cantacuzene (both parents possessing surnames of Byzantine imperial dynasties). Eudoxia was to have died on 6 July 1596, three years after the wedding, in childbirth, and the couple's only child was said to have been a girl named "Theodora Paleologus", married in 1614 in Naples to "Prince Demetrius Rhodocanakis". Though this genealogy has been accepted by some historians in the past, and notably convinced the papacy and the British Foreign Office, it originates from forgeries created in the 1860s by the London-based Greek merchant Demetrius Rhodocanakis, who claimed that one of Theodora's descendants was Dr. Constantine Rhodocanakis (a real historical figure), who Demetrius in turn claimed was his ancestor. Demetrius's forgeries were revealed when he published a biography on Constantine Rhodocanakis in 1872, wherein a portrait of Constantine was exposed to actually be a portrait of the author himself, dressed in a costume. His genealogy had been thoroughly debunked by the early 20th century.

== Legacy ==
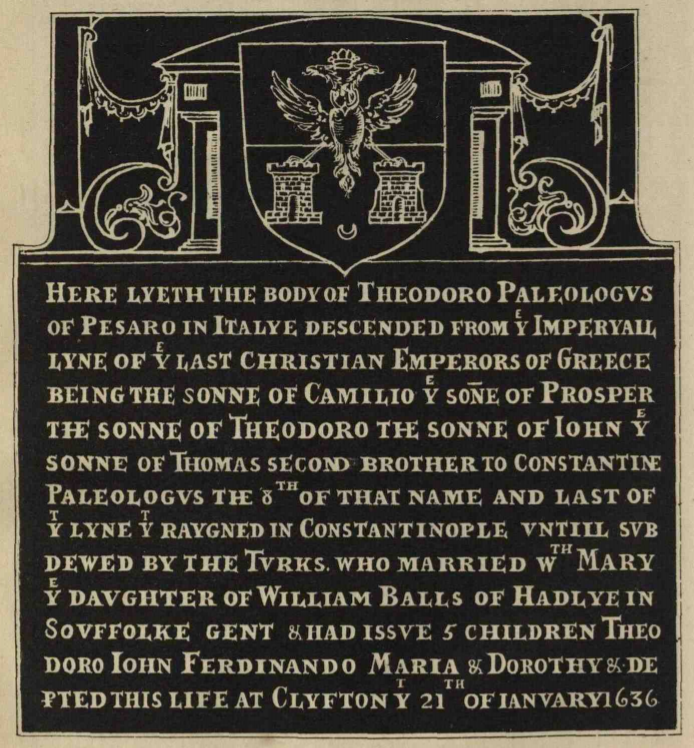
19th-century rubbing of Theodore's tombstone

Theodore's grave was accidentally opened in 1795, revealing an oak coffin. Inside, his body was discovered in a good enough state to ascertain that Theodore was far above common height and had possessed an aquiline nose and a long white beard reaching low on his breast. His well-preserved body means that he had probably been embalmed before being buried.

To this day, Theodore's tomb brings many Greek visitors to Landulph. Greek Orthodox memorial services have been observed for him twice, first in the late 20th century by the Welsh-born archimandrite Barnabas (1915–1995) and then in 2007 by Archbishop Gregorios, head of the Greek Orthodox community in Britain. Barnabas's service for Theodore in the late 20th century was the first service of any kind conducted in Theodore's name since his burial in 1636. Gregorios's rite, conducted on 18 April 2007, involved draping Theodore's grave in silk ribbons with the colors of the Greek flag, and also displaying flags with the double-headed eagle. The rite was not technically a full traditional memorial rite, since Theodore was not Orthodox, but included chants and incense. The two rites were evocations of ancient Byzantium never before seen in Landulph. Prince Philip, Duke of Edinburgh, a member of the modern Greek royal family, visited Theodore's tomb together with his wife, Queen Elizabeth II, in 1962.

Theodore has sometimes figured in popular culture. In the novel Sir John Constantine (1906) by Arthur Quiller-Couch, a band of Cornish squires called the "Constantines" are descended from Theodore. The novel is purported to be the 1756 memoirs of Sir John Constantine Paleologus, who with the rest of the Constantines go on several adventures. John Constantine is described as having white hair and an aquiline nose, clearly based on descriptions of the real Theodore Paleologus. In an earlier novella by Quiller-Couch, The Mystery of Joseph Laquedem (1900), a girl named Julie Constantine, also a fictional descendant of Theodore, features in the plot, alongside the actual grave of Theodore himself.

During World War I, playwright William Price Drury wrote and produced a play called The Emperor's Ring, in which the central plot revolves around a delegation from various states in the Balkans arriving to Landulph to bend the knee to a living descendant of Theodore, an aged miner called Simon Paleol in the play. After a telegram arrives informing the delegation of the death of Simon's only son in the trenches, their hopes are dashed and as Simon grows more and more tired of the delegation hoping for him to take his place on the throne of Greece, he grabs Theodore's old signet ring, a priceless heirloom, and throws it in the Tamar river. The Emperor's Ring was later reworked to a short story, published in 1919 with the title All the King's Men. All the King's Men also features a passage inspired by the opening of Theodore's grave, with the addition that his body crumbles to dust as the grave is opened.

The novel Days Without Number (2003) by Robert Goddard is a thriller with supernatural elements and incorporates fictional modern descendants of Theodore as a central plot element. In the novel, Theodore's Paleologus descendants battle with James Bond-style villains through murders, seductions and car and speedboat chases, all in order to find a lost stained glass window with an inscription supposedly containing the date of the Second Coming, preserved by the Knights Templar through the ages.
