= Henry Clinton, 2nd Earl of Lincoln =

English peer

Henry Clinton
- 2nd Earl of Lincoln

Earl of Lincoln
- Reign: 1585–1616
- Predecessor: Edward Clinton
- Successor: Thomas Clinton
- Born: 1539
- Died: 29 September 1616 (aged c. 77)
- Noble family: Clinton
- Spouses: Catherine Hastings; Elizabeth Morrison
- Issue: Thomas Clinton; Edward Clinton; Elizabeth Clinton; Henry Clinton
- Father: Edward Clinton
- Mother: Ursula Stourton

Henry Clinton, 2nd Earl of Lincoln, KB (1539 – 29 September 1616) was an English peer, styled Lord Clinton from 1572 to 1585. Known for repeated accusations of extortion, abduction and arson, among other things, Henry was likely among the most feared and hated noblemen in England during his time as Earl of Lincoln.

== Life ==
Arms of the Clinton family.

The eldest son of the 1st Earl of Lincoln, by second wife Ursula, daughter of William, 7th Baron Stourton, Henry Clinton was appointed a Knight of the Bath in 1553. He was returned to the House of Commons, representing the constituency of Lincolnshire in 1571, having been commissioned a Captain of Horse in the Royal Guards in 1569. He also served as Vice-Admiral of Lincolnshire and of Yorkshire.

He inherited the earldom and barony from his father in 1585. By his father's will, which Henry initially contested (its provision to his step-mother a life interest in various properties), he inherited Tattershall Castle; his wife Elizabeth had a life interest in the family property at Sempringham, and subsequently, Lincoln feuded with the poet Tailboys Dymoke, son of his brother-in-law Robert Dymoke, over some obnoxious verses.

In his time, Clinton was one of the most brutal, feared and hated feudal lords in Britain. Several records speak of the Earl launching attacks against barons near him, sometimes sending properly equipped troops. The Earl is frequently credited with sabotage, extortion, abduction and arson and at one point expanded his castle walls into the nearby churchyard. The Earl was often away from his seat at Tattershall Castle in Lincolnshire, often staying at London due to his frequent entanglements with the law.

Clinton was sent as ambassador to the baptism of the Landgrave of Hesse's daughter Elizabeth in 1596, departing from Yarmouth in June with his son Edward Clinton, Richard Brackenbury, John Wroth, and Richard Fiennes. According to Anthony Bacon he was not a success as a diplomat. The embassy was described in a published account by Sir Edward Monings, The Landgrave of Hessen his princelie receiving of her Maiesties embassador (London, 1596). They lodged for three days at the castle of Zappenburg and were met near Kassel by an African servant of the Landgrave riding a camel.

In 1599, Clinton hired the infamous Greek assassin, Theodore Paleologus, as his Master of the Horse. Paleologus, a descendent of the Palaiologos dynasty that had ruled the Byzantine Empire, had previously failed to track down a target in London and was looking to earn money. Clinton presumably knew of Theodore's previous work and likely had intended uses for his work beyond his skill with horses.

In January 1600 Clinton wrote to the Earl of Shrewsbury, mentioning that he was short of money. He was waiting for £500 from the Countess of Bedford and had already pawned his best jewels with Robert Brook a London goldsmith. In April 1601, when he was supposed to host Queen Elizabeth I at his mansion in Chelsea, Clinton, perhaps due to realizing that he could not offer a great enough feast due to his financial situation, simply left Chelsea without informing the Queen's party. His actions caused great uproar from the Queen's close advisors, as can be seen in letters sent to the Earl, as they had knocked on both gates of the mansion and despite being able to see Clinton's servants looking out at them from the windows, had not been let in. Clinton later attributed the incident to a "misunderstanding".

At the Union of the Crowns, Clinton and Francis Norris were sent north by the Privy Council to meet Anne of Denmark at Berwick-upon-Tweed and escort her towards London. However, at Doncaster and Northallerton they heard reports of a delay caused by the queen's illness at Stirling Castle, and sought permission from Lord Cecil to return home.

The significant depopulation of Lincolnshire in 1607 may be attributable to the Earl's actions.

He died at Sempringham, being succeeded by his son Thomas, 3rd Earl of Lincoln.

== Family ==
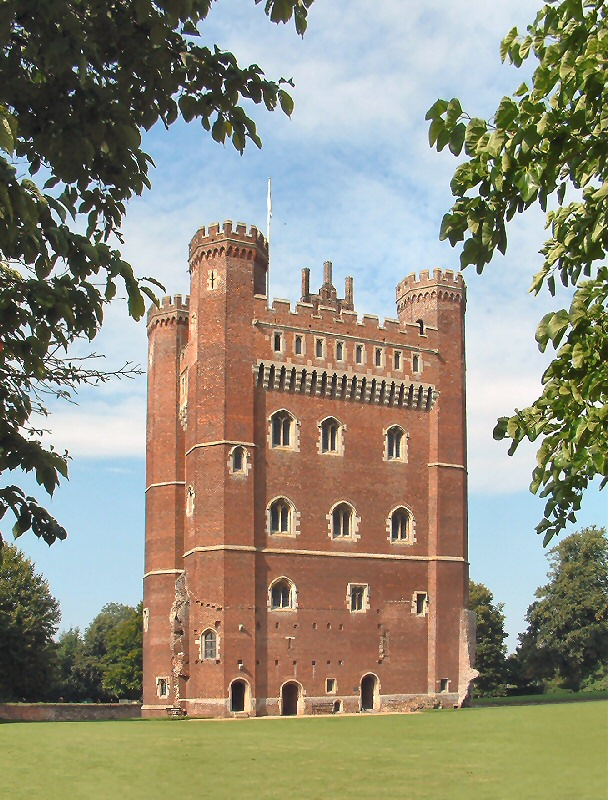
Tattershall Castle, Lincolnshire, the seat of the Earl of Lincoln.

Clinton married firstly in 1557 Lady Catherine Hastings (born 11 August 1542), daughter of the 2nd Earl of Huntingdon, and Catherine Pole, and had:

- Thomas Clinton, 3rd Earl of Lincoln
  - Theophilus Clinton, 4th Earl of Lincoln
    - Edward Clinton, Lord Clinton
      - Edward Clinton, 5th Earl of Lincoln (1645–1692)
- Sir Edward Clinton, married Mary Dighton, and had:
  - Francis Clinton, married Priscilla Hele, and had:
    - Francis Clinton, 6th Earl of Lincoln, married second Susannah Penyston, and had:
      - Henry Clinton, 7th Earl of Lincoln
    - Priscilla Clinton, married Sir Willoughby d'Ewes, 2nd Baronet, of Stowlangtoft (died 13 June 1685)
- Lady Elizabeth Clinton, married Sir Arthur Gorges

Lord Lincoln married secondly after 20 October 1586 Elizabeth Morrison (died c. 4 July 1611), daughter of Sir Richard Morrison, of Cassiobury, Hertfordshire, and had:

- Sir Henry Clinton (1587–1641), married firstly Eleanor Harington, married secondly in 1624 Elizabeth Hickman, and by his first wife had two surviving sons:
  - Henry Clinton (1611–1670), married Jane Markham, leaving two co-heiresses (Elizabeth Willoughby and Catherine Disney).
  - Norreys Clinton (1617–1693), married third Margaret Raines, and had:
    - Norreys Clinton (1651–1736), married Elizabeth Kendall, and had:
      - Kendall Clinton (1692–1740), married Frances Wilkinson, and had:
        - Norreys Clinton (1720–1764), married Martha Thompson, and had:
          - Rev Preb Dr Charles Fynes-Clinton (died 1827), married Emma Brough, and had: Henry Fynes Clinton (died 1852) and Clinton Fiennes-Clinton (died 1833), MPs for Aldborough; g-g-g-grandfather of Edward Fiennes-Clinton, 18th Earl of Lincoln, 10th cousin of Edward Pelham-Clinton, 10th Duke of Newcastle.

Peerage of England
Preceded by Edward Clinton	Earl of Lincoln; 1585–1616	Succeeded by Thomas Clinton
Preceded by Edward Clinton	Baron Clinton (by writ of summons); 1585–1610	Succeeded by Thomas Clinton
Political offices
Preceded by Sir Henry Gates	Vice-Admiral of Yorkshire; 1573–1578	Succeeded by Francis Cholmley from 1583
