= Landulph =

Coordinates: 50.432°N 4.211°W

Landulph: Cornish: Lanndhylyk
- Location within Cornwall
- Population: 499 (United Kingdom Census 2011, including Cargreen )
- OS grid reference: SX431615
- Civil parish: Landulph
- Unitary authority: Cornwall
- Ceremonial county: Cornwall
- Region: South West
- Country: England
- Sovereign state: United Kingdom
- Post town: SALTASH
- Postcode district: PL12
- Dialling code: 01752
- Police: Devon and Cornwall
- Fire: Cornwall
- Ambulance: South Western
- UK Parliament: South East Cornwall

Landulph (Cornish: Lanndhylyk) is a hamlet and a rural civil parish in south-east Cornwall, England, United Kingdom. It is about 3 miles (5 km) north of Saltash in the St Germans Registration District.

The parish lies on the River Tamar (which forms the county boundary between Cornwall and Devon) and the river surrounds Landulph to the north, east and south. Across the river are the Devon parishes of Bere Ferrers and Tamerton Foliot. To the south-east of Landulph is the parish of Botusfleming and to the west the parish of Pillaton. The population in the 2001 census was 485, which increased to 527 at the 2011 census.

Settlements in the parish include the hamlet of Landulph and the bigger village of Cargreen which is on the bank of the River Tamar. The manor of Landulph belongs to the Duchy of Cornwall.

The parish church of St Leonard & St Dilpe is in Landulph hamlet at OS Grid ref SX431615. Features of interest in the church include the panelling of the Lower family pew (ca. 1600), some unusual bench ends, a memorial inscription on brass for Theodore Paleologus (d. 1636), a descendant of the Byzantine Emperors, and a fine tomb of Nicholas Lower, d. 1655. Another brass is a memorial to Elizabeth Lower, 1638.

== Francis Jago Arundell ==
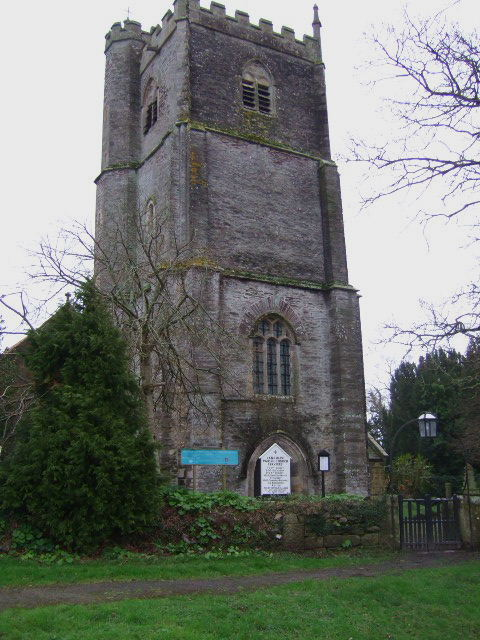
Landulph Church

Francis Vyvyan Jago was born at Launceston, in July 1780, the only son of Thomas Jago. (He afterwards adopted the additional surname of "Arundell", which had been one of the famous Cornish recusant dynasties - those landed English families who, at the risk of a range of dire penalties, refused to renounce their devout Roman Catholic faith during the English Reformation.) From youth to old age Jago was imbued with a love of antiquarian study, and after his institution in 1805 to the rectory of Landulph he threw himself avidly into studying the history of Cornwall.

== Notable people ==
- According to historian and literary scholar Louise Imogen Guiney, during the Elizabethan era, Dr. William Alabaster, who would go on to become an important figure in the Christian poetry of the Anglosphere, served as Landulph's Church of England Vicar between 1596 and 1597. The living, which at the time was worth 400 crowns a year, was allegedly secured for Alabaster through the influence of his patron, courtier Robert Devereux, 2nd Earl of Essex.
- In the church of Landulph is a brass to the memory of Italo-Greek nobleman, soldier, and assassin Theodore Paleologus, a descendant of the Palaiologos dynasty who had ruled the Byzantine Empire until its fall in 1453, and who died in Landulph on 21 January 1637. An account of the inscription, and of the person whom it commemorated, was printed by Jago in the volume of the Archæologia for 1817, and reprinted in Davies Gilbert's Cornwall (iii, 365). This paper was afterwards amplified into Some Notice of the Church of Landulph, which was published in 1840, and a reprint of which, with additions by Joseph Polsue of Bodmin, was announced some years ago (i.e. before 1885).
