= St. John's Parish Church, Barbados =

Church in Barbados

Coordinates: 13.185°N 59.498°W

St. John Parish Church is an historic church building in Barbados. It is the first church of St. John that is presumed to have been a simple wooden building, but its date is unknown. The parish along with St. George, was carved out of St. Michael in 1640–1641. But successive churches were badly damaged by the hurricane of 1675, the Great Hurricane of 1780, and finally destroyed by the 1831 Barbados–Louisiana hurricane. The present church building (the fifth) was built in 1836, and the chancel added in 1876. It is the prototype of the restrained Barbadian version of the Gothic parish church, and a beautiful Westmacott sculpture, commemorating Elizabeth Pinder, on the left of the main door.

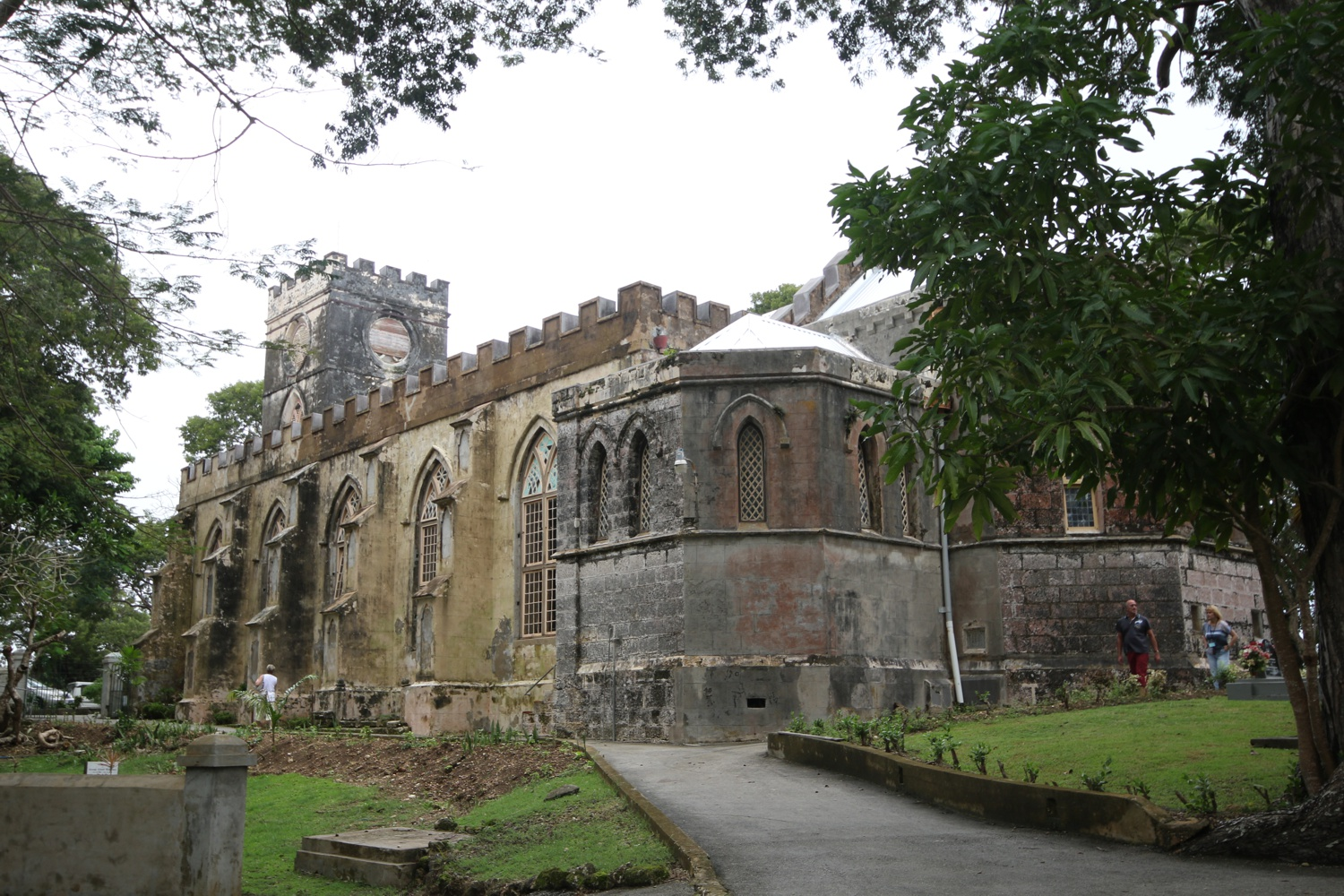
Church 2016

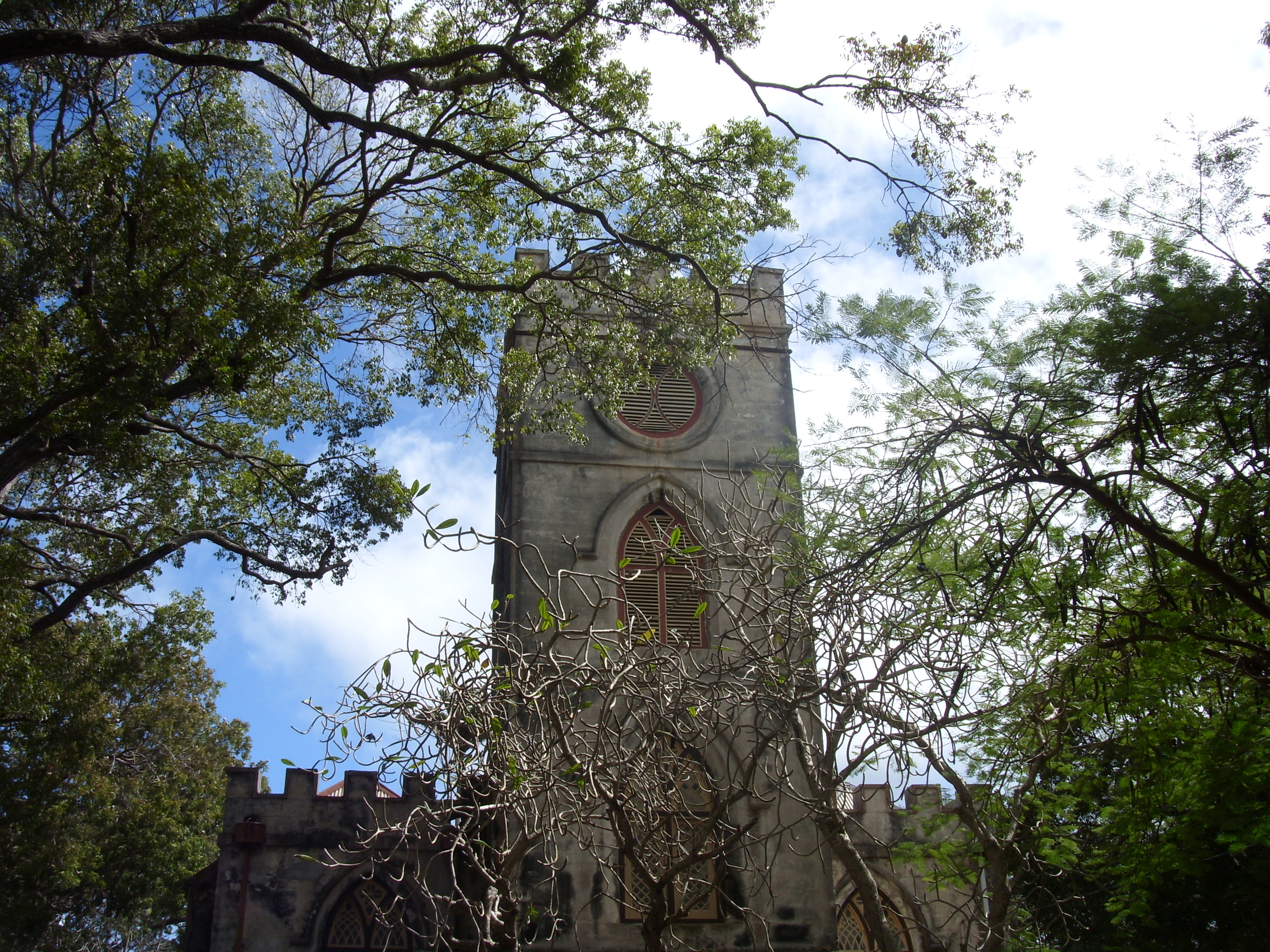
Church tower 2008

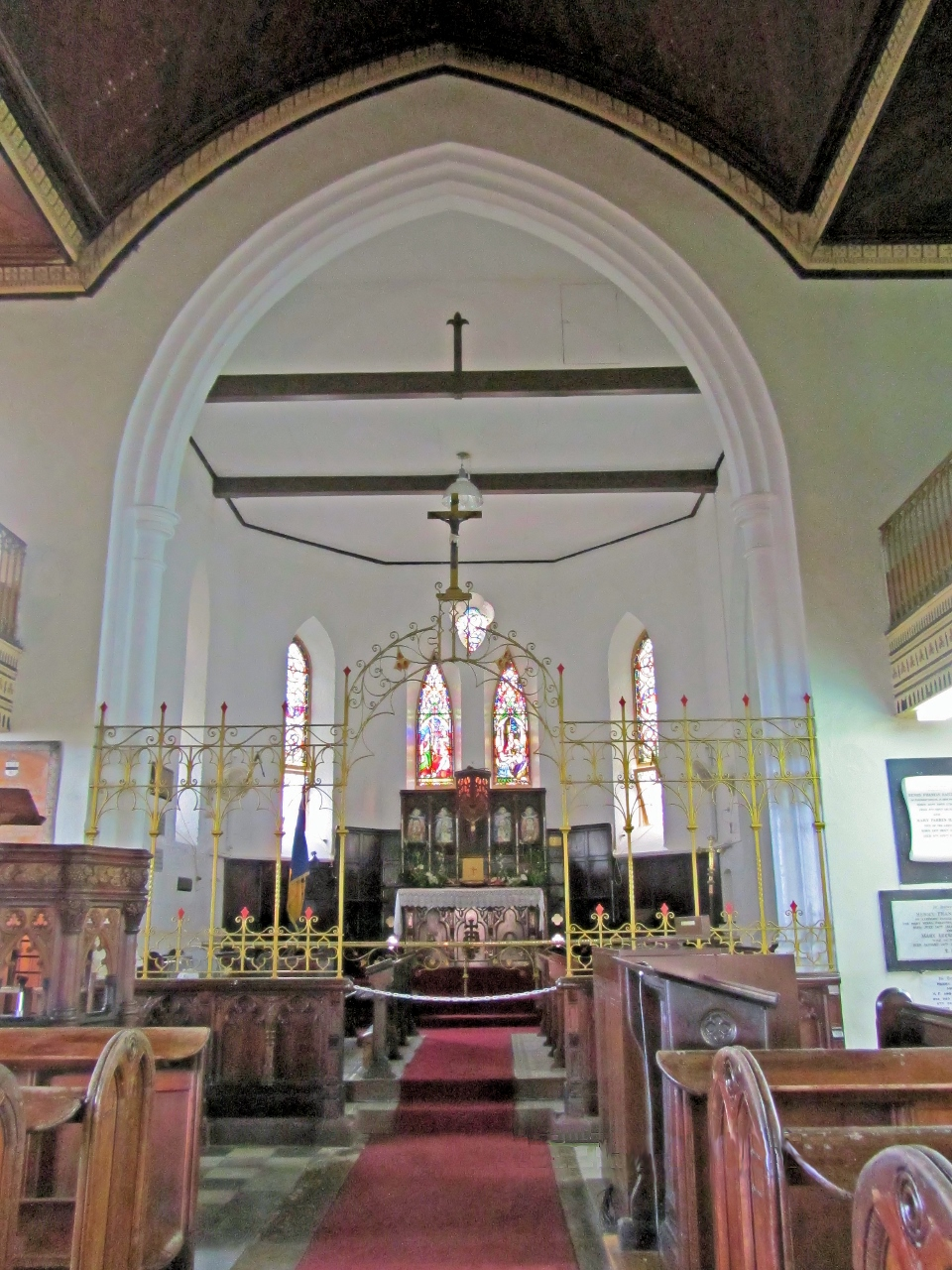
The nave 2012

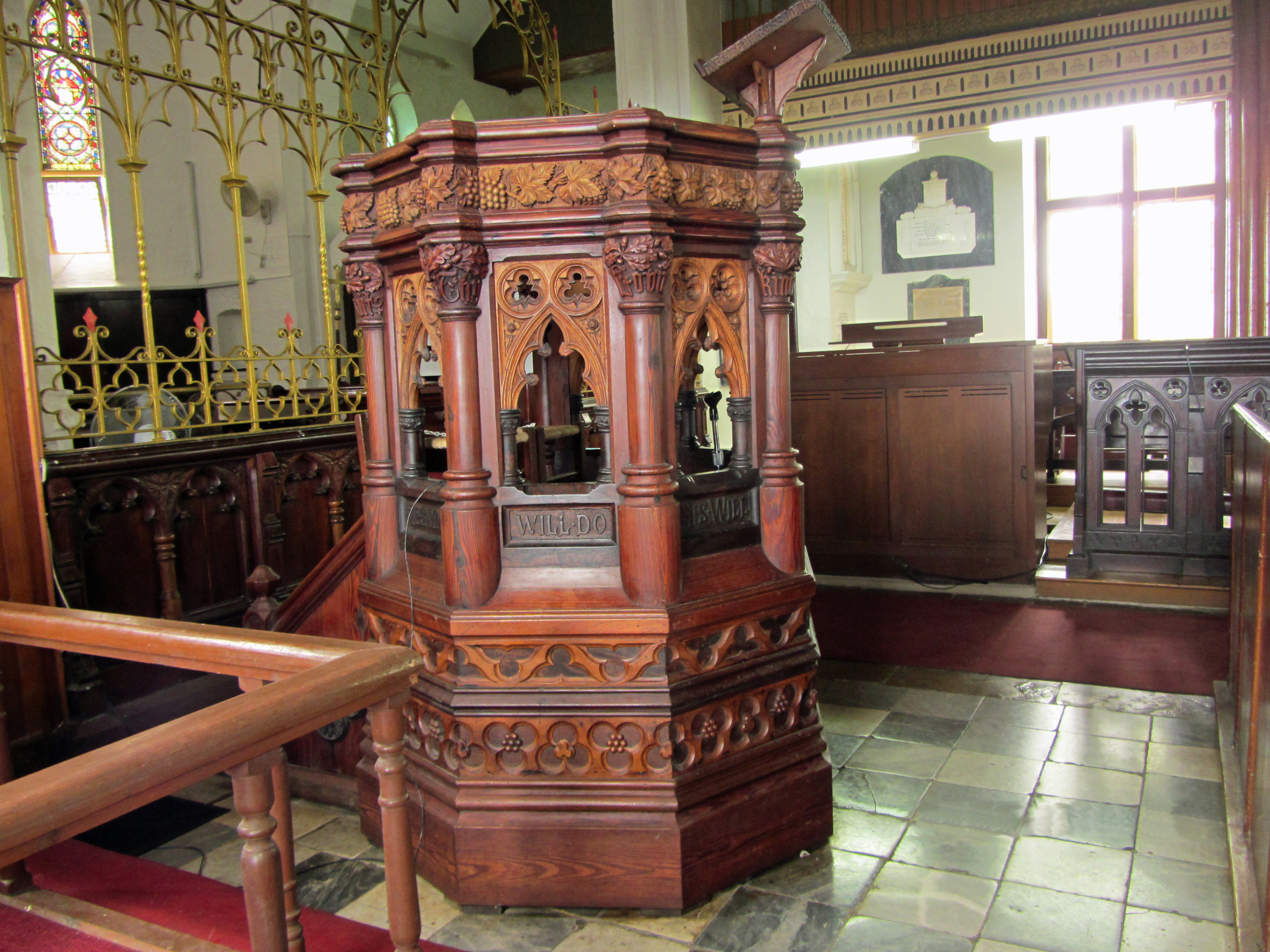
Pulpit 2012

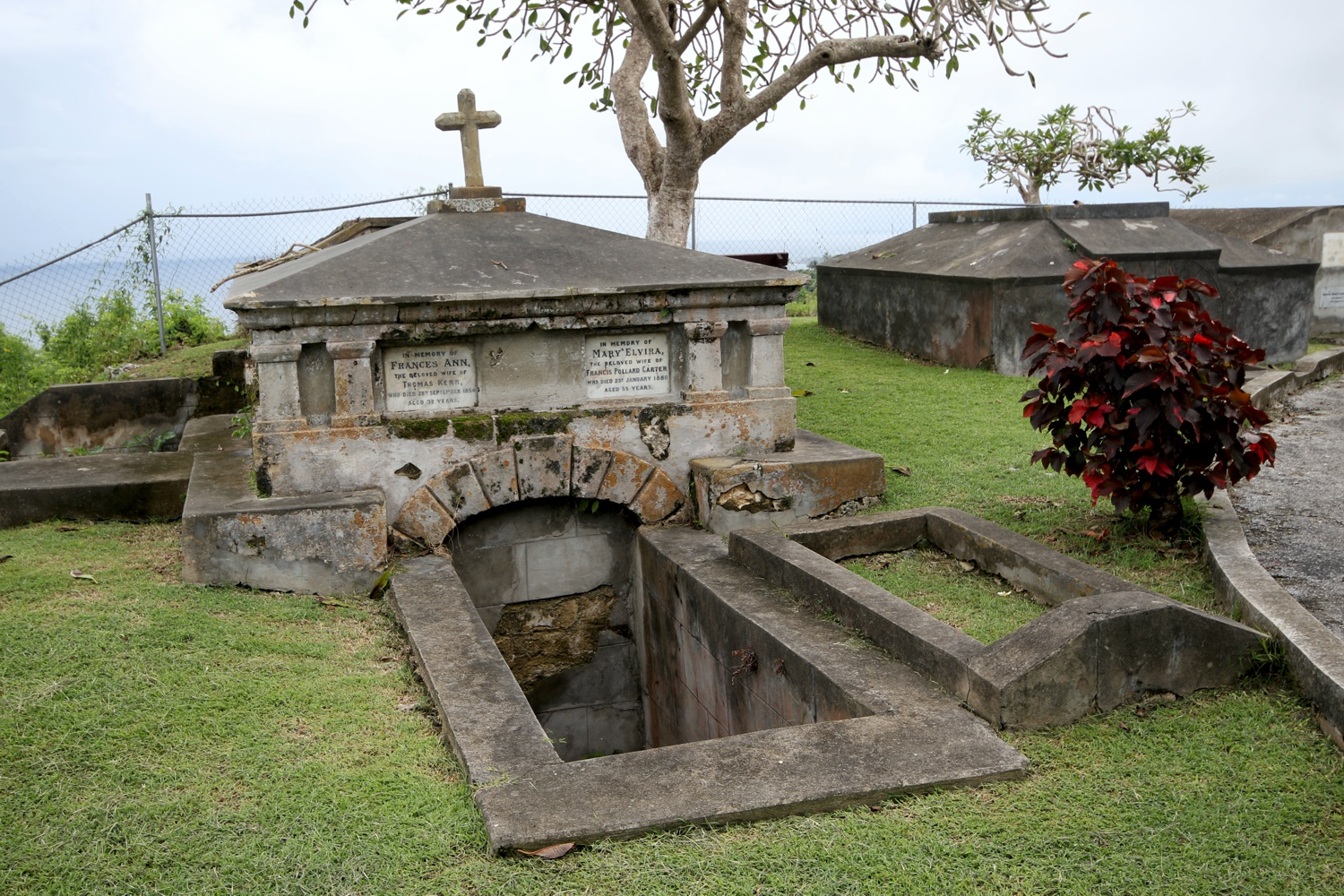
Cemetery 2016
