= Alessandro Antelminelli =

Italian diplomat (1572–1657)

- Born: November 19, 1572; Lucca, Republic of Lucca
- Died: July 10, 1657 (aged 84); London, Kingdom of England
- Burial place: St Bartholomew-the-Great; 51°31′7.92″N 0°05′58.77″W
- Other names: Amerigo Salvetti
- Office: Tuscan ambassador in London
- Term: 1618-1657
- Successor: Giovanni Salvetti Antelminelli
- Criminal charges: High Treason
- Criminal penalty: Death penalty
- Children: 6
- Father: Bernardino di Baldassarre Antelminelli
- Family: House of Antelminelli

Alessandro Antelminelli (19 November 1572 – 10 July 1657), also known by his pseudonym Amerigo Salvetti, was an Italian diplomat, adventurer and conspirator.

== Biography ==
Alessandro Antelminelli was born in 1572 into a wealthy and noble family of Lucca. The family of Antelminelli (or Interminelli as Wotton and others spelt the name) were collaterally descended from Castruccio Castracani, who was tyrant of Lucca in Dante's time. In 1596, whilst he was engaged in business in Antwerp, his father and his three brothers were first tortured and then executed on charge of high treason against the Republic of Lucca. Though Antelminelli had been absent during the time of the crime, he was nonetheless summoned to stand trial for his supposed complicity, but before his arrival he was condemned to death. A price was also set upon his head and assassins were hired to kill him. He learnt these facts whilst on his way to Lucca, to answer the charges brought against him, and then turned aside to Florence. For fifty years Alessandro was hunted by the spies and assassins of the Republic. After a brief stay at Florence he fled to London, which, however, he soon left, finding his life in danger from the emissaries of Lucca. In 1599 he took the name of Amerigo Salvetti, giving himself out to be a Florentine, and he travelled on the continent for a few years; but wherever he went he was pursued by agents of the government of Lucca seeking to kill him. As "Salvetti", Antelminelli became a comrade of the diplomat and poet Sir Henry Wotton. For some time he travelled with Wotton, but this intimacy, as the Archives of Lucca prove, did not prevent Wotton plotting in 1607 to give Antelminelli up to the Magistrates of Lucca in exchange for a Captain Robert Elliot whom King James I was anxious to get into his power. Ferdinando de' Medici frustrated Wotton's plot, and sent Elliot out of danger under a strong escort. Salvetti then came back to London, where he resided for the rest of his life. In 1618 he was appointed, by Cosimo de' Medici, the Tuscan Resident at the Court of Whitehall. His dispatches, of which there are transcripts in the British Museum, are a source of information, well known to historians about the times of Charles I and the Commonwealth.

The attempts of the government of Lucca to procure the assassination of Salvetti were repeatedly renewed for many years, and lasted at least until 1627, as is shown by letters preserved in the Archives of Lucca. The authorities at Lucca had first hired Marcantonio Franciotti to kill Antelminelli. Franciotti had been paid 200 pounds in advance, but had failed to track down Antelminelli and suggested that the authorities at Lucca commission a "more seasoned killer". Franciotti recommended Theodore Paleologus. At this point, Theodore Paleologus had established himself as an assassin, and seems to have had an impressive reputation. Like Franciotti before him, however, Paleologus also failed to kill Antelminelli. In 1620 Michele Balbani, a Lucchese spy in London who had undertaken to procure the assassination of Salvetti, wrote to Lucca that he had found willing agents for that purpose but that, one after another, they all excused themselves from making the attempt in London "where every citizen was policeman."

The story of Salvetti's life is set out in detail in a privately printed pamphlet by Salvatore Bongi, Keeper of the Archives of Lucca. Salvetti continued to act as the Tuscan representative at the English Court until his death in London, at the age of 85, on July 2, 1657. He is buried in Priory Church of St Bartholomew the Great. His son, Giovanni Salvetti Antelminelli, was appointed to succeed him, as Tuscan Resident at the Court of Whitehall, and held that post until the commencement of the year 1679.

Antelminelli's letters are preserved in the National Central Library at Florence. Copies of the original have been made for the British Museum. A translation of Antelminelli's diplomatic letters by Charles Heath Wilson has been published in London in 1887.

== Works ==
- H. B. Tomkins (ed.), The Manuscripts of Henry Duncan Skrine, Esq: Salvetti Correspondence (HMC, 11th report, appendix, part I, 1887. online)

== Bibliography ==
- Calendar of State Papers and manuscripts existing in the Archives and collections of Venice (1603-1607), X, London 1900, n. 600, 601, 602.
- Bongi, Salvatore (1864). Storia di Lucrezia Bonvisi lucchese, raccontata sui documenti. Lucca. pp. 66–73, 162–182.
- Orrell, John, 'Inigo Jones and Amerigo Salvetti: A Note on the Later Masque Designs', Theatre Notebook, 30/3 (1976), 109–14.
- Villani, Stefano (2004). "Antelminelli, Alessandro [alias Amerigo Salvetti]". Oxford Dictionary of National Biography. Vol. 2. pp. 285–286. doi:10.1093/ref:odnb/64774.
- Villani, Stefano (2004). "Per la progettata edizione della corrispondenza dei rappresentanti toscani a Londra: Amerigo Salvetti e Giovanni Salvetti Antelminelli durante il "Commonwealth" e il Protettorato (1649-1660)". Archivio Storico Italiano. 162 (1): 109–125. JSTOR 26231157.
- Hall, John (2015). An Elizabethan Assassin: Theodore Paleologus: Seducer, Spy and Killer. Stroud: The History Press. ISBN 978-0750962612.
- Miani, Gemma (1961). "ANTELMINELLI, Alessandro". Dizionario Biografico degli Italiani (in Italian). Vol. 3: Ammirato–Arcoleo. Rome: Istituto dell'Enciclopedia Italiana. OCLC 883370.
