= Louisa Ulrika of Prussia =

Queen of Sweden from 1751 to 1771

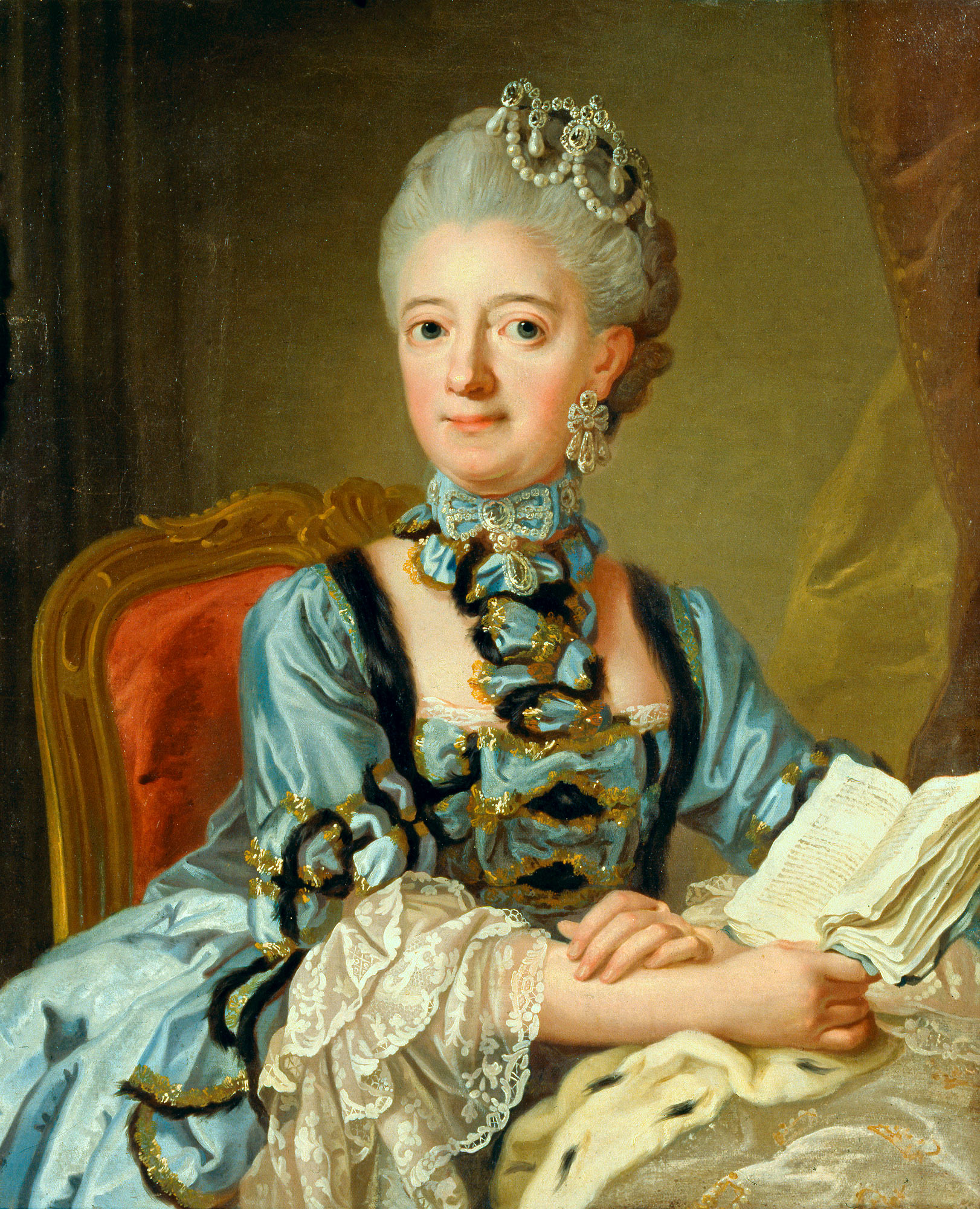
- Portrait by Lorens Pasch, c. 1768

Queen consort of Sweden
- Tenure: 25 March 1751 – 12 February 1771
- Coronation: 26 November 1751
- Born: 24 July 1720; Berlin, Kingdom of Prussia
- Died: 16 July 1782 (aged 61); Svartsjö, Sweden
- Burial: Riddarholmen Church
- Spouse: Adolf Frederick, King of Sweden (m. 1744; died 1771)
- Issue: Gustav III, King of Sweden; Charles XIII, King of Sweden; Frederick Adolf, Duke of Östergötland; Sophia Albertina, Abbess of Quedlinburg
- House: Hohenzollern
- Father: Frederick William I of Prussia
- Mother: Sophia Dorothea of Hanover

Louisa Ulrika of Prussia (Swedish: Lovisa Ulrika; German: Luise Ulrike; 24 July 1720 – 16 July 1782) was Queen of Sweden from 1751 to 1771. She was married to king Adolf Frederick and she was queen mother during the reign of king Gustav III.

== Early life ==
Louisa Ulrika was born in Berlin as the daughter of Frederick William I of Prussia and his wife Sophia Dorothea of Hanover, and was thus a younger sister of both Wilhelmine of Bayreuth and Frederick the Great. She was given the Swedish name Ulrika because Queen Ulrika Eleonora of Sweden had been her godmother. She exchanged letters with her godmother, and it was thought that she would marry a future son by Ulrika Eleonora, as Ulrika Eleonora herself had once been considered as a consort for Louisa Ulrika's father. However, Ulrika Eleonora remained childless.

Louisa Ulrika was described as beautiful, intelligent, with a fierce temperament and a strong will. She was given an advanced education in accordance with the French Age of Enlightenment by the governess Marthe de Roucoulle and the governor Maturin Veyssiére la Croze, both French Huguenots. Her intellectual interests were not opposed by her father who, while disapproving in her brothers interest for learning, did not do so in the case of Louisa Ulrika, who was reportedly a favorite of her father. She and her eldest brother, the future Frederick the Great, had a reasonably good relationship, sharing their interest in science and culture. Her favorites among her siblings were her younger brother Prince Augustus William of Prussia and her sister Princess Sophia Dorothea of Prussia. At the court of her mother, she was introduced to Voltaire, with whom she engaged in a lifelong correspondence, and Maupertuis.

=== Marriage negotiations ===
Several dynastic marriages were considered for her from 1732 onward, including Frederick Lewis, Prince of Wales, Charles III of Spain and Louis of Hesse-Darmstadt, but none came to fruition. She was appointed co-adjutrix of Quedlinburg Abbey with the prospect of becoming a reigning princess-abbess in 1743, a future of which she did not approve.

In 1743, an election was held to appoint a crown prince to the Swedish throne, as Frederick I of Sweden was childless, and the French de facto regent, Cardinal Fleury, suggested a marriage between Louisa Ulrika and the French candidate: Christian IV, Count Palatine of Zweibrücken. This plans discontinued when Christian lost the election to the Russian candidate, Adolf Frederick of Holstein-Gottorp. When negotiations were made to arrange a marriage for the newly elected crown prince Adolf Frederick of Sweden, the first candidate for the match was Princess Louise of Denmark.

These plans were revoked when a decision was made to create a triple alliance between Sweden, Russia and Prussia through dynastic marriage. The heir to the Swedish throne was therefore to marry a member of the Prussian royal house, while the heir to the Russian throne was to marry Sophie of Anhalt-Zerbst (the future Catherine the Great) who had been selected by Prussia. In accordance with this agreement, Louisa Ulrika or her sister Princess Anna Amalia of Prussia were to be selected for the Swedish match. The Swedish envoy in Berlin, Carl Rudenschöld, inspected them and recommended that the proposal be made to Louisa Ulrika. Frederick the Great himself preferred Anna Amalia for the Swedish marriage: he described Anna Amalia for the Swedish representatives as goodhearted and more suitable for Sweden, while Louisa Ulrika was arrogant, temperamental and a plotting intriguer. It has been suggested that Fredrick's judgment was given because he believed that Anna Amalia would be easier to control as a Prussian agent in Sweden than the strong willed and dominant Louisa Ulrika. After having consulted Adolf Frederick, however, the Swedes chose Louisa Ulrika, and her brother gave his consent on 1 March 1744. She was given tuition about Sweden, was advised not to get involved in politics, and converted to Lutheranism on 28 June.

== Crown Princess ==
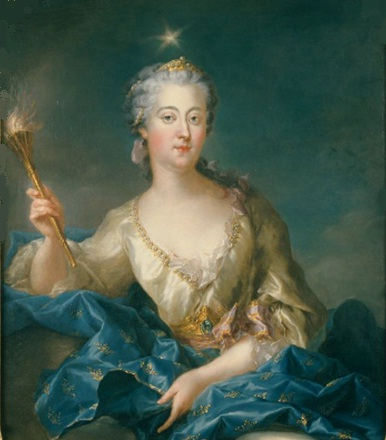
Louisa Ulrika of Prussia as the goddess Aurora by Francois-Adrien Latinville (1747).

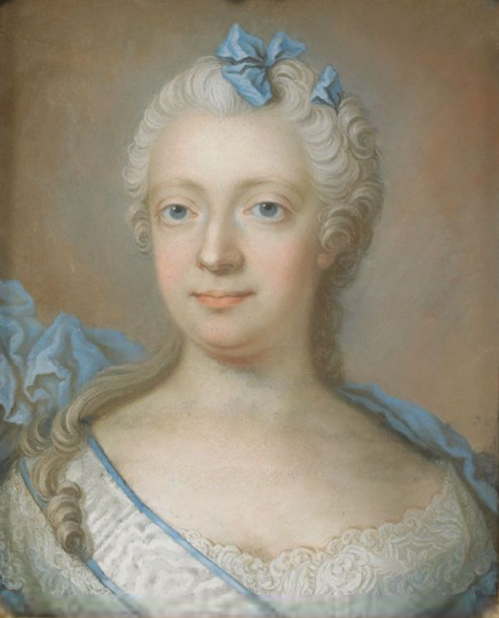
Lovisa Ulrika by Gustaf Lundberg.

=== Wedding ===
On 17 July 1744, Louisa Ulrika and Adolf Frederick were married per procura in Berlin, with her favorite brother August Wilhelm as proxy for the absent groom. She was escorted from Berlin to Swedish Pomerania by the Swedish envoy count Carl Gustaf Tessin, his spouse Ulla Tessin and his wife's niece Charlotta Sparre, who was appointed her maid of honor. In Swedish Pomerania, the entourage was welcomed by the Swedish General Governor of the province and the court of the late queen under the leadership of her Mistress of the Robes, countess Hedvig Elisabet Strömfelt: she kept only her lady-in-waiting Wilhelmine von der Knesebeck and a couple of footmen of her Prussian entourage.

The entourage left from Rügen and arrived in Sweden in Karlskrona, where she was officially welcomed by her spouse, Crown Prince Adolf Frederick of Sweden. On 18 August 1744, they were welcomed by King Frederick I at Drottningholm Palace, where their second wedding ceremony was performed the same day, followed by a ball, a court reception and the consummation of the marriage. Louisa Ulrika and Adolf Frederick reportedly had a mutually good impression of each other at their first meeting, and their personal relationship is described as mutually happy and harmonious. Adolf Frederick is described as introverted, gentle, and submissive. Reportedly, Louisa Ulrika was pleased with him because she immediately felt secure in the fact that she was his superior. Already during their first day together, she informed him that her brother Frederick the Great had plans for the alliance between Sweden, Russia and Prussia, and asked him to raise the subject with the Prussian envoy, which he also agreed to.

=== Cultural activity ===
Louisa Ulrika was received with enthusiasm in Sweden as the hope for the salvation of succession crisis. At the birth of her first child in 1745, no children had been born in the Swedish royal house in over 50 years and she gained initial popularity with her beauty, wit and interest in science and culture. Carl Gustaf Tessin described her as "the wisdom of a god in the image of an angel",. Despite French being her native language, she was tutored in Swedish by Carl Jesper Benzelius and mastered it well after only two years. She studied Swedish literature and gathered a Swedish language library, she corresponded with the Royal Swedish Academy of Sciences and created a nature scientific collection. Her arrogant and haughty demeanor, however, eventually made her less popular outside of the royal court.

Upon her arrival, she was granted Drottningholm Palace as her summer residence, where the "Young Court", as it was called, amused themselves with picnics, masquerades and French language amateur theater. The Crown Prince's court was dominated by Carl Gustaf Tessin, who escorted Louisa Ulrika to Sweden and remained an influential favorite during her years as Crown Princess. Adolf Frederick never cared much for Tessin, but Louisa Ulrika had him appointed marshal at court and eventually royal governor of her son Prince Gustav. Tessin was behind many amusements in the circle of the Crown Princess, and it was said that he was only too eager to please Louisa Ulrika in any way possible. There were unconfirmed rumors that Tessin was the lover of Louisa Ulrika during her tenure as Crown Princess. Her son Gustav III later addressed these rumors, that although Count Tessin had been in love with her, his feelings were one-sided and not answered by his mother, as a love affair with a noble contradicted the "natural contempt" which Louisa Ulrika herself as a royal felt for every subject, noble or not. Her circle at court included Henrika Juliana von Liewen, who immediately became her favorite among her ladies-in-waiting; the intellectual Cathérine Charlotte De la Gardie, the scientist Eva Ekeblad, and the witty Anders Johan von Höpken.

=== Political activity ===
From the moment she arrived in Sweden, Louisa Ulrika engaged in political activity. Her political ideal was absolute monarchy, and she disliked the Swedish constitutional monarchy from the moment it was explained to her. She also disliked the system of legal justice. When she, at one point, thought herself exposed to a plot, she wrote: "The laws are so strange, and one does not dare to arrest someone on mere suspicion without proof, which benefit the individual more than the Kingdom." She respected the political ability of Carl Gustaf Tessin, and identified him as an ally in her wish to increase royal power. At Christmas 1744, she visited Tessin and gave him a lantern in the guise of the goddess Diana with the inscription: "Made only to shed light on the political system of the day".

In the circle of her own court, she was surrounded by sympathizers of the Hats. Her favorite Henrika Juliana von Liewen was a prominent sympathizer of the Hats, as was Claes Ekeblad, Hans Henrik von Liewen, Anders Johan von Höpken and other members of her personal circle of friends, and through her court connections, she made an alliance with the Hats (party). Her strategy was to affect the votes in the parliament of the Riksdag through bribes. After the birth of her eldest son in 1746, she accompanied the Crown Prince on an official tour through the country, during which she gathered agents among members of the Caps through bribes. At the visit of the Cap's parliamentary Kalsenius, she described him as: "The biggest villain in the world, but I will not leave until I have bribed him. That is the only means by which one can reach the goal one has in mind." Kalsenius is also confirmed to have voted with the Hats party in the exactly the issues interesting to Louisa Ulrika during the votes in the Riksdag. Her goal was to overthrow the constitution and reintroduce the system of absolute monarchy with enlightened absolutism in Sweden. Her plans were internationally noted already by her creation of the L'Ordre de l'Harmonie, with the motto of unity. Her plans were opposed by Russia and Great Britain, who in 1746, allied with the Caps (party), attempted to stage a coup through their agents in Sweden against the royal house.

In February 1748, Louisa Ulrika prepared her first coup d'état to deposed parliamentary rule in favor of absolute monarchy. At that point, the king had taken ill and Russia was engaged in the War of the Austrian Succession. With the support of Tessin and Frederick the Great, Louisa Ulrika and the Hats party agreed to change the constitution in favor of more royal power, should the king die when the Russians were engaged in the war and unable to react. Louisa Ulrika agreed to let the Riksdag keep their power over the laws, while the monarch should be given power of the army, treasury and the foreign policy. The coup was aborted with the peace of the war and the recovery of Frederick I. In foreign policy, she was loyal to Prussia. Her brother Frederick the Great had given her the task to break the alliance between Sweden and Russia in favor of an alliance with Prussia: she made an alliance with Tessin, the Prussian ambassador and the Hats party, convinced Adolf Frederick to state his support for a Prussian alliance, and though she failed in the 1745 vote, the parliament voted for an alliance between Sweden, Prussia and France in 1747.

== Queen ==
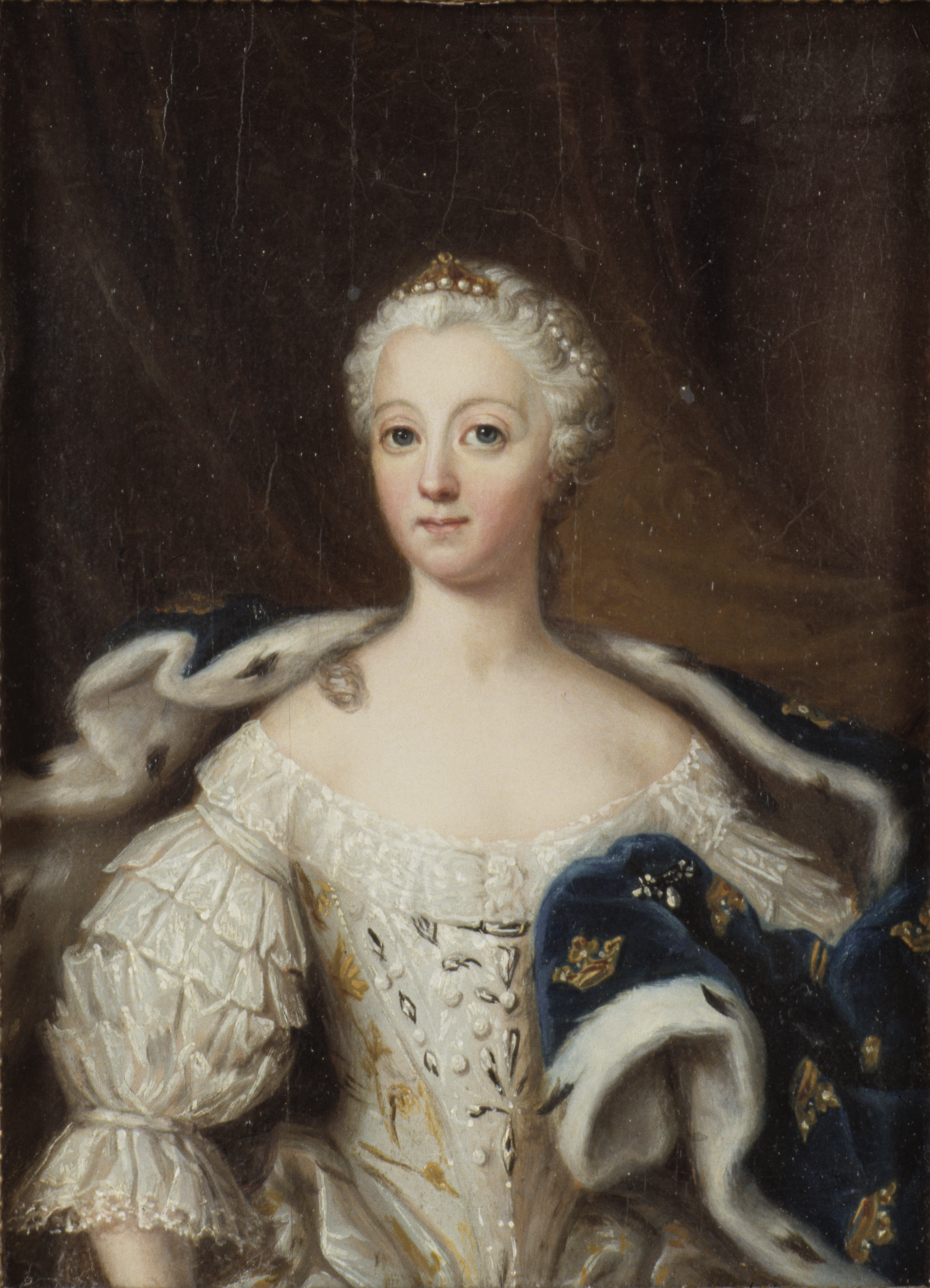
Louisa Ulrika of Prussia by Ulrika Pasch.

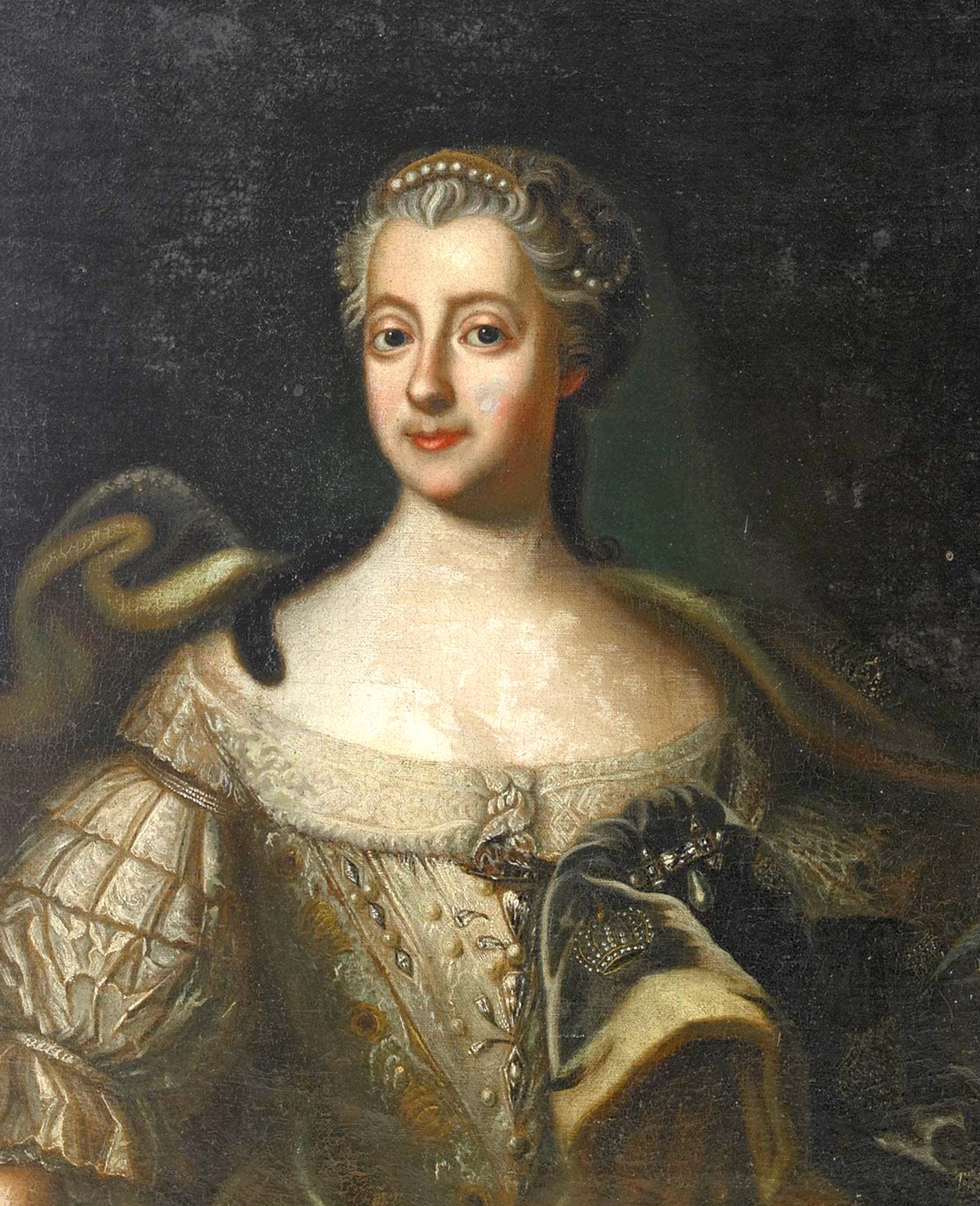
Louisa Ulrika of Prussia by Carl Fredrich Brander.

=== The Royal Court Party ===
In 1751, the night before the death of King Frederick I, Louisa Ulrika prepared a coup d'état with Crown Prince Adolf Frederick and Hans Henrik von Liewen. The plan was, that rather than being confirmed as monarch by the Riksdag of the Estates after having made the royal oath to respect the constitution, Adolf Frederick was to take the initiative and, immediately after the King's death, take control of the royal council and declare himself monarch by inheritance rather than to be elected as such by the Riksdag.

To investigate the preparations of the Royal Council, Louisa Ulrika personally contacted her favorite, Councillor Carl Gustaf Tessin, in his bed chamber that night. However, Tessin refused to inform her of the plans of the council, and further refused to support her plans of a coup Upon the moment of the King's death on 25 March, Tessin instead presented Adolf Frederick with a statement of a royal oath to sign before being acknowledged as king. On 26 March 1751, Adolf Frederick made an oath to the Riksdag of the Estates to respect the constitution before being acknowledged as king, in the presence of Louisa Ulrika. Prior to their coronation, Louisa Ulrika, in collaboration with her brother Frederick the Great, tried to prove that the constitution allowed the monarch more power than what the Riksdag had stated, and made clear that she was considering to refuse to allow Adolf Frederick sign the oath. On the day before the coronation, she was eventually forced to allow Adolf Frederick to sign it.

Adolf Frederick and Louisa Ulrika were crowned King and Queen of Sweden at Storkyrkan in Stockholm 26 November 1751. As Queen, Louisa Ulrika had some significance as a patron of culture and science. In 1753, she founded the Royal Swedish Academy of Letters, History and Antiquities, and acted as patron of Carl von Linné, who was given the responsibility for the nature scientific collection at Drottningholm Palace. Her "adoption" of Gustav Badin was, in fact, intended as a form of scientific experiment. She also acted as patron for artists such as Hedvig Charlotta Nordenflycht, Olof von Dalin, Jean Erik Rehn and Johan Pasch. She also had the Drottningholm Palace Theater and the Confidencen theater built: however, being a Francophile, as was the fashion, she did not benefit but rather interrupted the development of the Swedish theater, as she evicted the newly founded Swedish language theater at Bollhuset and replaced it with a French Theatre, the Du Londel Troupe, which was only a benefit for those who could speak French.

Immediately after the coronation, Louisa Ulrika prepared a new coup in favor of absolute monarchy. Queen Louisa Ulrika strongly dominated her husband and the court, and she would likely had been the real ruler during her spouse's reign had Sweden been an absolute monarchy: at this point, however, the King was a mere decoration. This greatly displeased the Queen, herself born in an absolute monarchy. She could not understand nor condone the Swedish parliament, the Riksdag. For her, it was not acceptable for a royal person to have to receive peasants in the royal salons, as she was forced to do with the peasant's representatives from the Riksdag. She was further enraged when the Riksdag forced the King to give up his claims on the throne of Holstein-Gottorp. To display her contempt, she humiliated the representatives of the Riksdag by using the etiquette of the royal court: she stopped their carriages at the Palace gates, forced them to wait for hours while she let those who arrived after them be received, and let them sit on smaller chairs to humiliate them. In the court theatres, the French theatre troupe and the Italian opera company performed plays encouraging the King to take control of his kingdom.

Tessin was no longer in her favor as a political ally, as he wrote in his diary that she no longer discussed politics with him and "claimed that she took no part in politics". She also broke her earlier alliance with the Hats, which opposed her plans of an absolute monarchy. Instead, she formed a new party among the opposition in the Riksdag by promising rewards to her followers in case of a successful coup in favor of royal power. This group was called Hovpartiet (English: 'The Royal Court Party'), the leading members being Carl Gustaf Löwenhielm, Adam Horn, Nils Adam Bielke, Erik Brahe, Eric Wrangel and Gustaf Jacob Horn. In 1753, she planned to stage a coup against the royal council to overthrow the constitution in collaboration with Anders Johan von Höpken, Carl Fredrik Scheffer and Claes Ekeblad, but the plan was aborted when Ekeblad refused. She unsuccessfully tried to convince France to retract their support of the Hats to deprive them of French support in the future conflict she and the Hovpartiet expected with the Hats in the constitution issue by claiming that she did not wish to change the constitution, merely attempting to prove that it did in fact allow for greater royal power than the Riksdag was willing to admit.

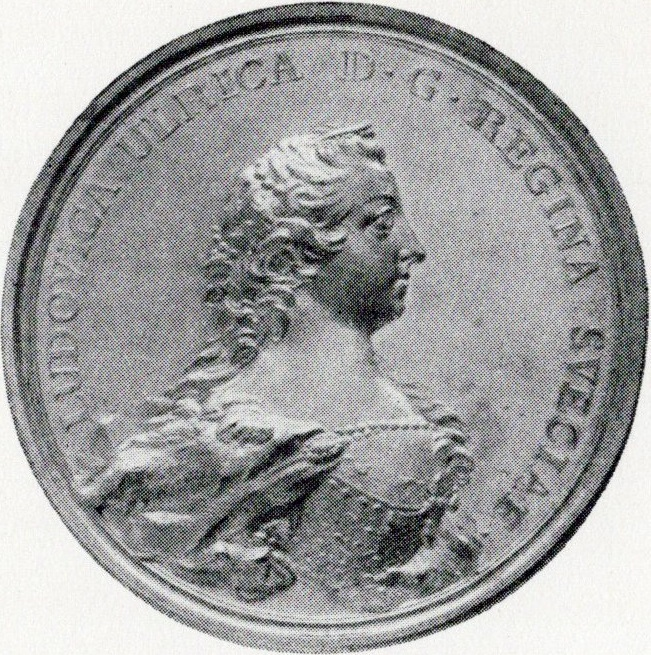
Medal of the queen in 1751

The year 1754 was the year of the alienation of Tessin. His favor with the Queen had deteriorated since 1750-51: first, when he used the Riksdag to force her to agree to the engagement between Crown Prince Gustav and Sophia Magdalena of Denmark, when she herself had wished to engage her son to Margravine Philippine of Brandenburg-Schwedt; and second, when he had betrayed her plans of a coup at the accession of her spouse. The relation between Louisa Ulrika and Tessin was never well seen by Adolf Frederick. Contemporary witnesses state the Tessin was in love with her and "was not always able to conceal his feelings for the Crown Princess". It is unknown whether there was ever any physical relationship between the Queen and Tessin, but Louisa Ulrika herself mention in her memoirs that she had been offended somehow in that aspect. According to Crown Prince Gustav wrote in 1769, that Tessin had made Louisa Ulrika "suggestions far from the reverence one is expected to show toward a sovereign." The Queen felt her pride offended and informed the King, who surprised Tessin on his knees before the Queen. This incident led to the King's animosity toward Tessin and the exile of Count and Countess Tessin from court. The queen only remarked that she missed Countess Tessin.

=== Revolution of 1756 ===
The question on the replacement of Tessin as the governor of the Crown Prince placed the Queen in conflict with the Riksdag. Tessin was replaced as governor of the Crown Prince with Carl Fredrik Scheffer, a candidate selected by the Riksdag, an appointment which was enforced even after the candidate had been refused by the Queen. In 1755, the Riksdag presented their decision to rectify the loop holes in the constitution which Louisa Ulrika had used to claim that the King had greater constitutional power than the Riksdag had allowed him to practice. They stated that the loop holes in the constitution allowing for royal power would be removed, and that the monarch would no longer be allowed to refuse his signature: if he did so, a stamp with his name would be used. At the same time, a commission of the state begun to investigate political crimes. This resulted in a persecution of the followers of Louisa Ulrika within the Hovpartiet, one of whom, Eric Wrangel, fled to Norway to avoid arrest. Reportedly, this provocation triggered the Queen's plan of a coup d'état, known in history as Coup of 1756.

The first plan was for the royal couple to travel to Uppsala under the pretext of a visit to Drottningholm Palace. In Uppsala, they would summon the regiments of Närke, Värmland and potentially Uppland as well as the Life Guards and march toward the capital. This plan was aborted because of the King's illness in April 1755. To finance the coup, the Queen pawned parts of the Crown Jewels in Berlin. In the three months following her coronation, Louisa Ulrika removed 44 diamonds from the Queen's Crown and replaced them with glass, which she pawned in Berlin as security for a loan by the help of her brother August. At this point, rumors reached the Riksdag. A lady-in-waiting of the Queen, Ulrika Strömfelt, who was a loyal follower of the Hats and not a supporter of absolute monarchy, reportedly informed the Riksdag that parts of the Crown Jewels were missing.

In April 1756, the Riksdag demanded to inventory the Crown Jewels. The queen replied that she refused to allow them to see the Crown Jewels as she regarded them as her private property. At this point, the King was taken ill, and she was thereby given the time to send for the jewels from Berlin. She was finally forced to agree to present them to inventory on 22 June. To prevent this, she and her followers within the Hovpartiet, Hård, Horn and Brahe, planned to stage the coup before that day, despite the protests of king Adolf Frederick. The plan was to bribe members of the public to create riots in the capital. The supporters of Hovpartiet would then take control of the Stockholm guard and garrison, which were also to be prepared through bribes. When the military was called out to deal with the riots, it would seize control over the capital's military headquarters: the Riksdag would be closed and the opposition arrested and a new Riksdag would be summoned, which would be made to approve of a new constitution, reintroducing absolute monarchy.

The 21 June 1756, the royalist Ernst Angel was overheard talking about the plans of a royal revolution while drunk at a tavern. In parallel, one of the royalist officers, Christiernin, attempted to enlist Corporal Schedvin of the garrison in the coup who, however, informed the Hats. On 22 June 1756, the King and Queen left the capital for Ulriksdal Palace to avoid being present during the inventory of the Crown Jewels. That same day, Ernst Angel, Christiernin, Stålsvärd, Puke, Angel and a number of others were arrested. During the interrogation, Ernst Angel revealed the whole plot. When the King and Queen returned to the capital that night, the streets were patrolled by militia. The members of Hovpartiet were arrested or fled to avoid arrest. In July 1756, seven members of the Queen's followers were executed.

The Riksdag of the Estates was well aware that Queen Louisa Ulrika was responsible for the attempted coup d'état, and there were discussions as how to deal with the Queen's guilt. In the end, however, no action was taken against her, possibly with consideration to foreign powers. On 4 August 1756, a delegation from the Riksdag, led by the Archbishop of Uppsala Samuel Troilius, presented Louisa Ulrika with an note, which she was made to reply with a letter of regret. The declaration stated that "she had forgotten her duty to God, her consort and the Kingdom of Sweden and that she was responsible for the blood of the recently executed". She officially replied to the note from the Riksdag with gratitude for the reprimands on the behalf of the good of the nation and herself, and assured "that she had wished no evil upon the Kingdom". Troilius reported that "only God knows if it was said by heart, though one should hope for the best". The Archbishop reported, that he observed "tears of rage and sorrow" in her eyes. In private, Louisa Ulrika regarded the reprimand as a humiliating insult, and wrote to her brother Frederick the Great, that during the interview she attempted to display "all the coldness, all the contempt possible to make in a demonstration [...] In my hardest moments I remind myself that I am the sister of Frederick the Great", and that she regretted nothing but that her revolution had failed. At the same time the King also had a statement read for him by a delegation from the Riksdag, stating that he would be deposed if such an incident was ever to occur again.

=== Seven Years' War ===
In 1757, Sweden entered the Seven Years' War and declared war on Prussia, the birth country of Louisa Ulrika. The Queen opposed the act and regarded is as an insult, especially since she assumed that a Swedish victory over Prussia would result in the deposition of Adolf Frederick in favor of Christian of Zweibrucken-Birkenfeld. However, a potential Swedish defeat was seen by her as a good opportunity for a coup d'état in favor of absolute monarchy, as a defeat would discredit the Riksdag. Therefore, she successfully asked her brother Frederick the Great to ask for her as a mediator in future peace negotiations. When the moment arose in 1760, however, she could not use it, as she lacked necessary funds for bribes. In 1761, however, she managed to secure funds from Great Britain and Prussia, and made an alliance through bribes with the Caps (party) to affect the Riksdag in favor of peace with Prussia.

In January 1762, her suggestion of peace with Prussia was accepted in the Riksdag through her bought parliamentarians there, in exchange for a promise not to take revenge on the Hats (party). She was given the official assignment from the Riksdag to handle the peace negotiations with Prussia and secure that Sweden could keep Swedish Pomerania, a task she performed successfully, and she was officially thanked by the Riksdag for her service to the state in May. As a sign of gratitude for this act, the government paid her debts, which made it possible for her to use her money to affect the voting in the Riksdag through bribes.

=== The 1760s Riksdag ===
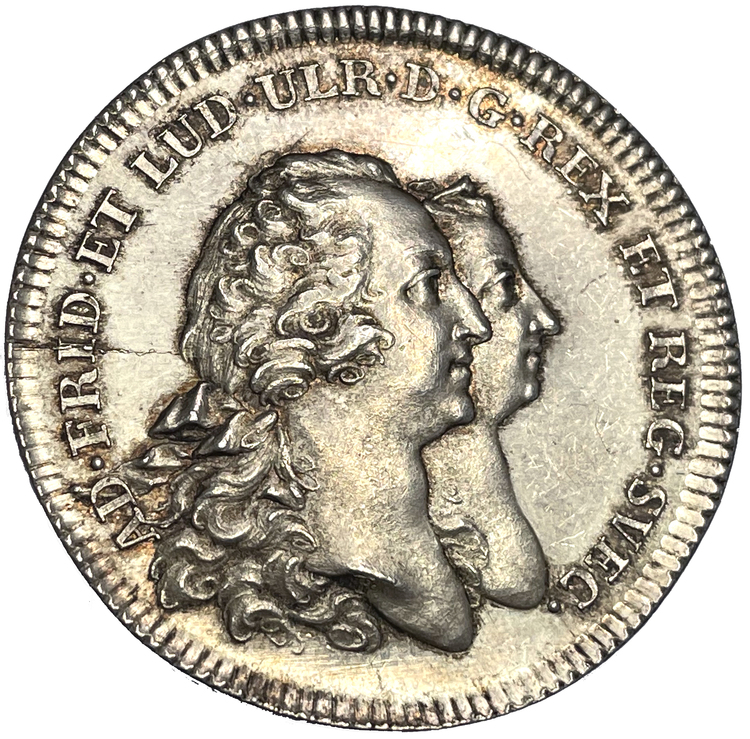
Medal of the king and queen 1762

In exchange for her service during the war, she demanded the 1756 reform of the constitution be retracted. It was decided that a special Riksdag of the states should be summoned to discuss a revised constitution: it was eventually set to take place in 1764. During the two years prior, Louisa Ulrika negotiated with members of both the Caps and the Hats to prepare for a successful reform in favor of absolute monarchy. She took the part of a mediator between to the two parties to unite them on which constitution to agree upon before the Riksdag was summoned. To prepare foreign powers for a new political system in Sweden, she founded a secret cabinet, Secret de la Reine, to handle her private foreign policy, appointing first Carl Wilhelm von Düben and then Nils Filip Gyldenstolpe in the position of her "foreign minister". She appointed Anders Rudolf Du Rietz as her informal ambassador to Catherine the Great in Russia, and she also had Carl Julius von Bohlen appointed official ambassador of Sweden in Prussia. She secured the support of Russia, France and Great Britain, but failed in securing the necessary funds for bribes to the coming Riksdag. In November 1764, the unity between the Caps and Hats parties was broken due to the suspicions of France (who supported the Hats) and Great Britain (who supported the Caps), which deprived Louisa Ulrika of her alliance with the Hats party.

During the Riksdag of 1765, the Queen attempted to balance the Caps and the Hats by creating a third party of her followers from both parties under her follower Malmstein, which she managed to have elected vice speaker. The election to the Riksdag of 1765 was won by the Caps party. By demonstrating how she could affect the votes in the parliament through her third party, she was able to secure her alliance with the Caps. She also summoned the Ambassador of Russia to Kina Slott to secure support from Russia and its ally Denmark. When the question of the Constitution was finally raised in the Riksdag in August, however, the Caps refused to accept an increased royal power and instead limited the power of the Crown even more. With this, her efforts failed once again.

=== Late years as queen ===
The powerful position of Queen Louisa Ulrika deteriorated with the declining health of her spouse, King Adolf Frederick, and the growing maturity of her son, Crown Prince Gustav. She recognized this threat, and when her son was declared an adult in 1762, she unsuccessfully opposed him taking a seat in the royal council. The tense relationship between her and her son, whom she viewed as a political rival, grew when he opposed her will by insisting to honor his engagement to Sophia Magdalena of Denmark, whom he finally married in 1766, instead of marrying a Prussian bride selected by her, which he viewed as a way for her to keep her influence over him and the family. After the Riksdag of 1766, it was no longer her, but her son the Crown Prince, who became the leader of the followers of absolute monarchy. In 1767, when the French ambassador sketched a suggestion of a Swedish coup d'état, it was, for the first time, the Crown Prince rather than the Queen who was regarded as the natural center figure of the coup.

During the December Crisis of 1768, the King refused to sign a state document, and a Riksdag was summoned to handle the situation. The royalists discussed a coup d'état to deposed the Riksdag and reintroduce absolute monarchy. Louisa Ulrika did not support a coup at that point, but her view was disregarded and the Crown Prince was instead seen as the leader of the opposition: the coup d'état was aborted because the Hats party broke an agreement rather than because of the Queen's opposition to it.

Her arrogance, her political views and her conflicts with the Riksdag made her less and less liked during her tenure as Queen. Carl Gustaf Tessin once said about her:

"It seems undeniable, that our Queen would have been the most staunch of republicans, had she been born a subject; but God has let her be born in a position, where one is protective of one's power".

== Queen Dowager ==
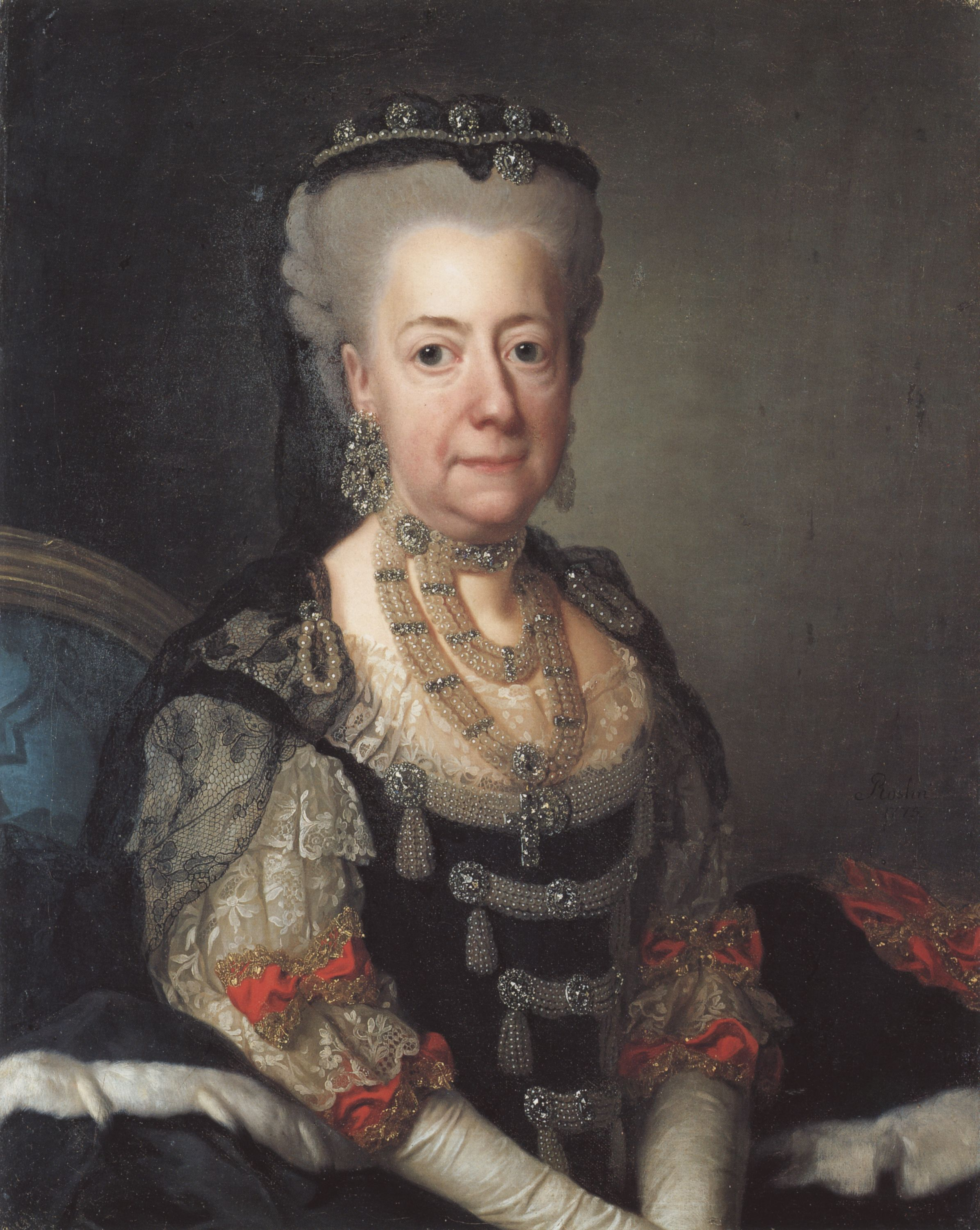
Louisa Ulrika as Queen Dowager

In 1771, the King died and she became Queen Dowager. By this time, Louisa Ulrika was immensely unpopular in Sweden. When the news of the old King's death reached her son, the new King Gustav III of Sweden, who was then in Paris, he wrote that the Queen Mother be protected, as "I know how little loved my mother is".

In the Revolution of 1772, her son succeeded where she had failed in 1756 by reinstating absolute monarchy, and his revolution was of great satisfaction to her. Louisa Ulrika wrote to Gustav III to congratulate him on the coup about which she said: "Yes, you are my son, and you deserve to be. I fly in to your arms and bless you. Perhaps I shall die of joy". At the time of the coup, she was in Berlin with her daughter. She was present in Swedish Pomerania when that province gave allegiance to the new constitution. When her brother, the King of Prussia, told her that the neighboring countries would now attack Sweden, she wrote to him that she would defend the province of Pomerania against him with her own blood.

Louisa Ulrika could, however, never settle with the position of Queen Dowager. She had expected to be the real ruler behind the throne, and when her son made it clear that he would rule independently from her, their relationship worsened. In 1772, he prevented her plans to marry off her second son Charles to Philippine of Brandenburg-Schwedt, and in 1774, Charles was married to Hedwig Elizabeth Charlotte of Holstein-Gottorp instead. Gustav III paid her debts with the condition that she established her own separate court at Fredrikshof Palace. In 1777, she was forced to sell Drottningholm Palace to her son Gustav.

In 1777–78, the conflict with her son erupted and she was a central figure in the great succession scandal regarding the legitimacy of the Crown Prince. In 1777, her two younger sons, Charles and Frederick Adolf, visited her. They claimed all women at court had lovers, and that with the exception of their mother, they could not think of even one who did not. Louisa Ulrika suggested that surely the Queen must also be an exception. In reply, her sons laughed and asked her if she had not heard of the rumors that Sophia Magdalena had an affair with Fredrik Munck. She became very upset and ordered Prince Charles to investigate if this were true, as his inheritance to the throne would be endangered by "the common offspred of a common nobleman". Charles talked to Munck, Munck talked to King Gustav, Gustav talked to Charles who claimed the whole thing was the fault of the Queen Mother, which resulted in a great conflict between mother and son. When the son of the King was born in 1778, rumours circulated that he was the son of Munck. Louisa Ulrika accused the King of having another man father his child. A great scandal erupted, during which the King even threatened to exile her to Pomerania. In the following conflict, her youngest children, Sofia Albertina and Frederick, who had always been her favourites, took her side against the King. Louisa Ulrika was forced to make a formal statement, during which she withdrew her accusation. The statement was signed by the entire adult royal family except the royal couple; two princes, the princess, the Duchess, and six members of parliament. The relationship with Gustav was not repaired until she was on her deathbed. She died in Svartsjö.

== Children ==
Adolf Frederick and Louisa Ulrika had five children:

1. Stillborn son (April 1745 – April 1745)
2. Gustav III of Sweden (24 January [O.S. 13 January] 1746 – 29 March 1792)
3. Charles XIII of Sweden (7 October 1748 – 5 February 1818)
4. Frederick Adolf (18 July 1750 – 12 December 1803)
5. Sophia Albertine (8 October 1753 – 17 March 1829)

== Ancestry ==
Ancestors of Louisa Ulrika of Prussia

8. Frederick William, Elector of Brandenburg
4. Frederick I of Prussia
9. Louise Henriette of Orange-Nassau
2. Frederick William I of Prussia
10. Ernest Augustus, Elector of Hanover (=12)
5. Sophia Charlotte of Hanover
11. Sophia of the Palatinate (=13)
1. Louisa Ulrika of Prussia
12. Ernest Augustus, Elector of Hanover (=10)
6. George I of Great Britain
13. Sophia of the Palatinate (=11)
3. Sophia Dorothea of Hanover
14. George William, Duke of Brunswick-Lüneburg
7. Sophia Dorothea of Celle
15. Éléonore Desmier d'Olbreuse

== Notes ==
Louisa Ulrika of Prussia House of Hohenzollern Born: 24 July 1720 Died: 16 July 1782
Swedish royalty
Vacant Title last held by Ulrika Eleonora of Sweden	Queen consort of Sweden; 1751–1771	Succeeded by Sophia Magdalena of Denmark
