= Economic history of Sweden's Age of Liberty =

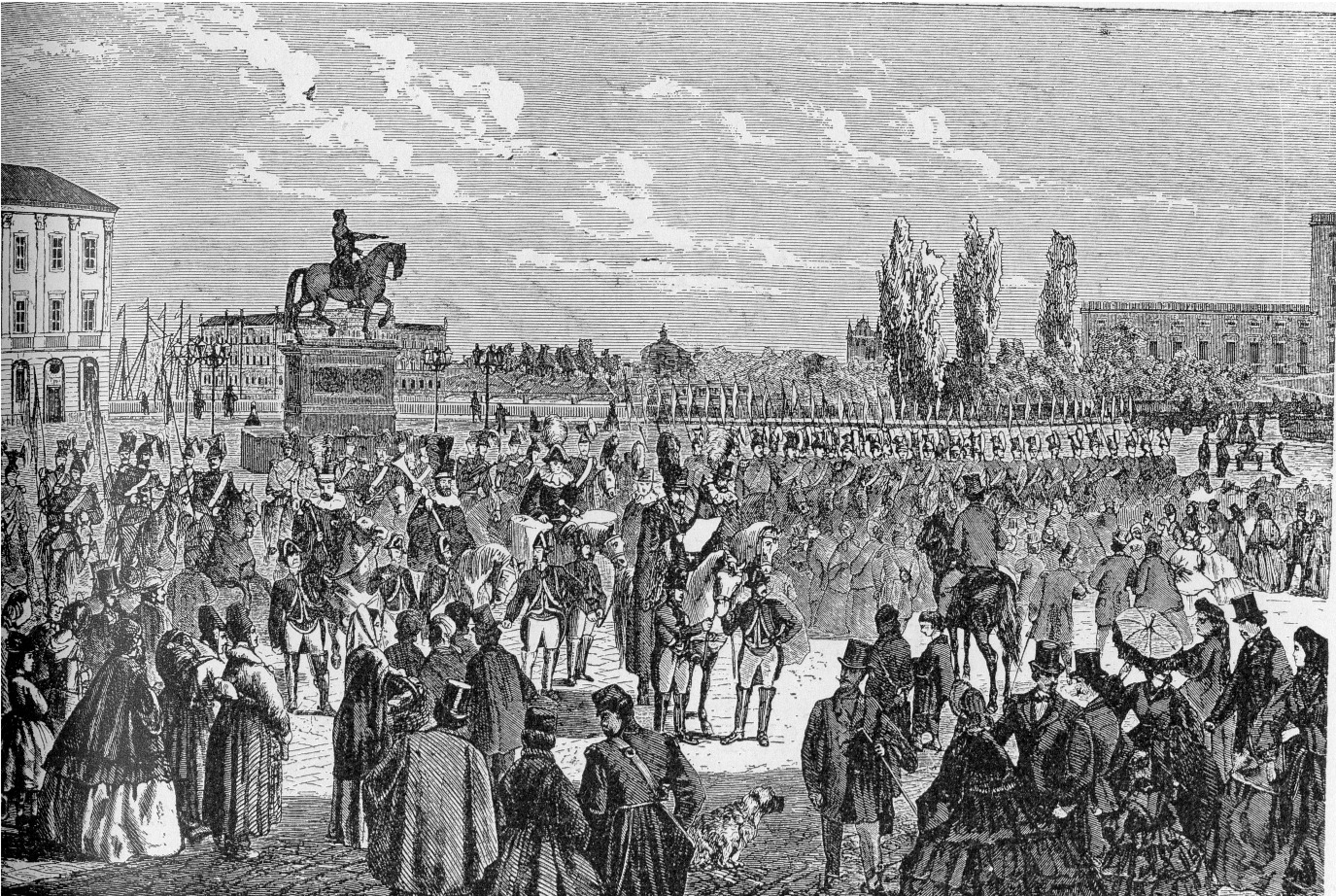
Stockholm after the end of Riksdag assembly

The economic history of Sweden's Age of Liberty examine the changes to the Swedish economy between 1718 and 1772. The economic factors that contributed to the fall of the Swedish Empire and the shift away from absolutism, as well as the legacy of the era in terms of the nation's economic history after 1772 are also noted.

The Great Northern War which lasted two decades left Sweden in a state of economic and demographic ruin. When King Charles XII died, the Riksdag of the Estates were convinced that it was the system of absolute monarchy, which reduced their power, that had brought the downfall of the country. Thus, after Charles' death, they established a system of quasi-democratic rule that ushered in the "Age of Liberty". This period would bring economic and social upheaval as well as industrial development; however, by the time the Age of Liberty had ended (as a result of a self-coup by King Gustav III) and the 19th century was at the doorstep, Sweden was by all objective measures a weaker nation than it was during its "Era of Great Power". Its land was diminished, its monopoly over the bar iron trade was gone, and it was lagging behind in the race towards early industrialization. This decline can be attributed both to fiscal, monetary and executive policy errors by the various Riksdag parties in power, as well as to technological and economic shifts which allowed Sweden's rivals and neighbours get ahead on the global stage. It was, however, the agricultural reforms, the early industrial developments, and the gradual change from mercantilism to free trade that occurred during this period which pioneered the path for Sweden's agricultural revolution in the 1790s and eventual large scale industrialization in the mid to late 19th century.

== Aftermath of the Great Northern War (pre 1718) ==
The Great Northern War spelled the end of Sweden's "Era of Great Power". Sweden's warrior-king was shot dead. Its empire waned as its many enemies pounced on the opportunity to attack it after Charles' decisive defeat at Poltava. Its once strong military was weakened. The humbled nation stepped into the 18th century firmly on the back foot.

Charles XII would be remembered as a tactician with a strong aptitude for warfare. It could be argued, however, that this trait is what brought the eventual downfall of the Swedish Empire. From an early age, he was taught to be wary of an aggressive war, but to never back down if Sweden were attacked. The young king took this advice to heart. When the coalition of Peter I, Frederick IV, and Augustus II attacked Sweden in 1700, Charles refused any and all peace offers after his initial string of victories in the first half of the war. Even after the failure at Poltava and consequent defeats, he refused peace deals that could have yet saved his empire. Between 1709 and 1716, Sweden's population had fallen from around 1,550,000 to under 1,400,000. Most of these losses were able bodied young men, leaving the population back home mostly women, children, and elderly. The constant levying of taxes for Charles' unyielding war effort, combined with bad harvests, meant a population that was perishing from hunger. To add to these issues, Charles' methods of paying for the war caused further strife. Georg Heinrich von Görtz, a Holstein statesman, was the minister of Sweden and a trusted advisor to the king. His monetary policy consisted of minting copper tokens which could be used to cheaply buy supplies and arms. The thought was that once the war was over, these tokens could be redeemed in silver, however, Charles went too far and flushed the economy with tokens to the point there was no chance they would be redeemable in silver once the time came. Merchants began demanding more for goods if they were paid in copper than in silver. This led to the king banning silver outright, demanding that all of it be handed into the government in exchange for copper.

These policies were largely unpopular with the Riksdag. They blamed absolutism for the state the country had fallen to. In their view, the ideology had allowed the young king to enact supreme rule and drive a nation to war with no regard for its people. Once the king died, shot by an unknown soldier during the Siege of Fredriksten in 1718, The Riksdag were quick to ensure that absolutism fell alongside its master. The new Queen, Ulrika Eleonora, would be allowed the throne only if she abolished the absolute monarchy and restored power to the Riksdag. In 1719 a new constitution was written. In the same year, the Riksdag enacted their first act of justice: the imprisonment and execution of Baron Görtz for his alleged betrayal of the country by his financial policy and his close association with the late king Charles. In 1721, individual peace treaties were signed with the belligerents of the Great Northern War. Thus began Sweden's Age of Liberty.

== Age of Liberty (1718 - 1772) ==
=== Political Background ===
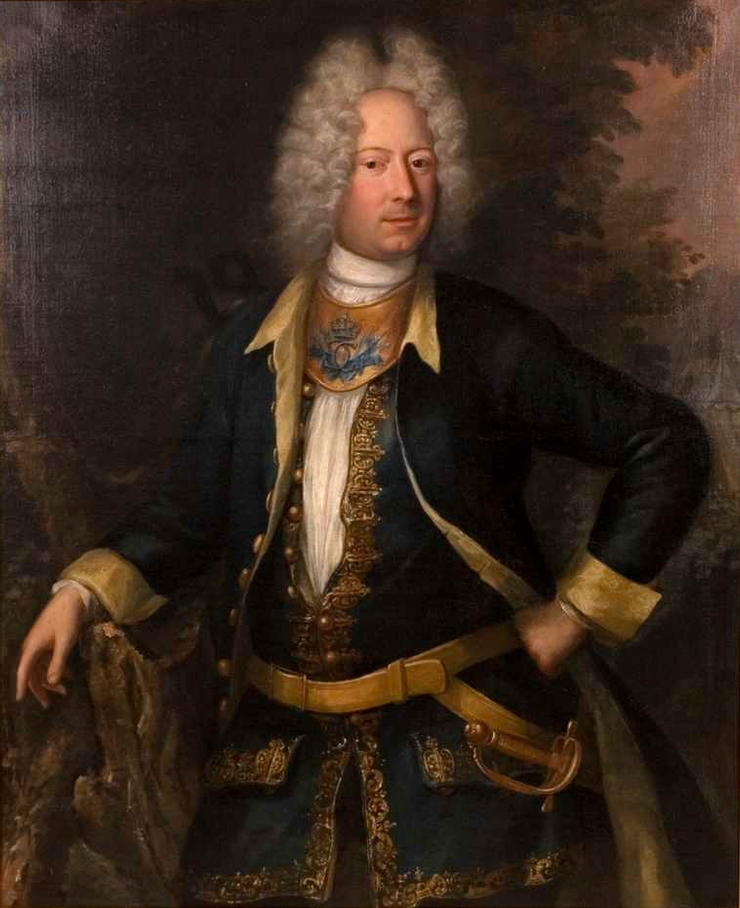
Arvid B. Horn

To understand the economics of the Age of Liberty it first necessary to understand how the new Riksdag worked, the different political parties that held power during the age, and their economic policies. Under the new constitution, the Riksdag alone had true executive and judicial power. The Riksdag elected council members and these members answered to the Riksdag. In this new system, all matters of importance were handled by a vote. Each of the 17 councillors had one vote, and the monarch had two. This mean the monarch had little in the way of real power.

The Old Caps under Arvid Horn wanted peace and neutrality to help rebuild the nation. Horn was a statesman and diplomat who had previously served as a confidant and trusted general of the late king Charles. He was elected President of the Privy Council, a role akin to a prime-minister, and served from 1710 to 1719 and then again from 1720 to 1738. Horn's economic policy sought moderate protectionism insofar as to secure Sweden's Baltic trade. He was opposed to the more robust tariffs and trade restrictions that occurred in the later part of his tenure, for he feared these policies would upset the foreign relations he wished to maintain. The Hats, who held power from 1738 to 1765 and then again from 1769 to 1772, were heavily in favour of mercantilist policy. The Younger Caps, who held power briefly between 1765 and 1769, represented the interests of smaller businesses who were in favor of free trade.

=== Agricultural Reform ===
In the early 18th century, Sweden's agriculture was based on a strip farming system where, in tiny villages, each farmer would have his own narrow strip to cultivate with his neighbour's strips beside him. This was inefficient as farmers would have to travel long distances from one strip to another to collect their crops. This also meant they had less time to attend to their animals. The demands of a rising population and the political push towards self-sufficiency meant this inefficiency was not feasible.

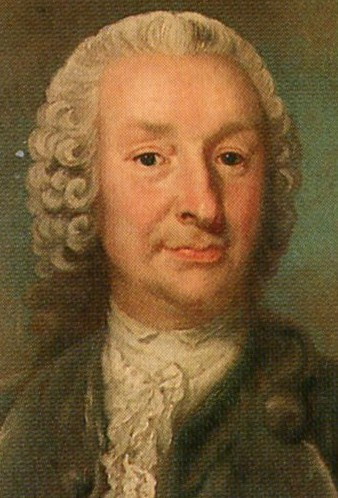
Jacob Faggot

One of the main figures of early agricultural reform was Jacob Faggot, a scientist who served as director of the Land Survey Office. In his 1746 publication "Swedish Agriculture's Obstacles and Assistance" (Svenska landtbrukets hinder ock hjälp), he advocated for redivision of crop fields so each worker would have his own fields consolidated in one space. The reformation came slowly, and for the most part, it occurred only in the province of Skåne. During this age, the consolidation was rarely more than 43 strips to 6 or 30 strips to 6, but efficiency did increase. Faggot also advocated for abolition of domestic harvesting restrictions, better field maintenance, and establishment of state warehouses for stockpiling grain during good harvest seasons. Some of the laissez-faire ideas he promoted in this book preceded future free-trade advocates, such as Anders Chydenius. These pioneering efforts, along with the liberalization and commercialization of land plots, laid the groundwork for the nationwide agricultural reform that would follow in the 19th century.

Another key innovation was the introduction of the potato, which was partly responsible for population growth. Jonas Alströmer was responsible for popularizing the potato in Sweden. While farmers were initially unconvinced of the new crop's value, failure of other crops in 1771-1773 eventually persuaded them. Eva Ekeblad should also be credited for the rise of the new crop. In 1748 she discovered a method of creating flour and distilling akvavit from potatoes, reducing the risk of famine in Sweden.

=== Industrial Development ===
The Age of Liberty saw the development of Sweden's first industries. A leading figure amongst Swedish industrialists was Jonas Alströmer. Born into poverty, Alströmer found work as an assistant to a Swedish merchant in London. During this time, he noted how Swedes would export raw materials only to import back the produced goods at a markup. Alströmer wanted to bring these industries to Sweden so they could produce their own finished goods. His first goal was establishing a textile industry, which he did by encouraging selective breeding of sheep and by creating Sweden's first textile mill in 1721, in his hometown of Alingsås. The factory failed to turn a profit, but it paved the paths for others to innovate and also introduced new techniques. Alströmer's industrial endeavours were also encouraged by the Hats once they came into power. He was provided various loans and grants to continue the expansions of his industrial works. The industrial developments of this time cannot be compared to large scale industrialization of later eras. Even in 1759 industries employed only 18,000 workers, fewer than a percent of the population. Furthermore, economic specialization, a sign of industrialization, did not occur in Sweden during this time. A major indicator of specialization is rural populations moving closer to urban centres. While Swedish population grew by over 50% between 1738 and 1805, the ratio of urban population to overall population remained roughly the same.

=== Economic Policies ===
==== The Commodity Act ====
Like other European states the during the early 18th century, Sweden followed a mercantilist trade policy. This dictated that economic success of a nation was derived from strong state control over the economy, having more exports than imports, and striving for self-sufficiency. In the Swedish Empire, foreign trade was prohibited in all inland towns. Goods had to be first sold to "staple towns" before they could be traded internationally. In Sweden there were over 20 such towns, the most active being Stockholm and Gothenburg, while in Finland only Helsinki, Turku, and Hamina had the same rights. Critics of this system called it "Bothnian trade prohibition" (bottniska handelstvånget). The Riksdag wanted to expand Sweden's merchant marine, and they sought this through the Commodity Act (produktplakatet) which was signed in 1724. This set of laws was similar to the English Navigation Acts. It decreed that a foreign nation could export to Sweden only those products that were produced domestically by said nation. Arvid Horn was not involved in drafting this law, as his party was against trade policy that would upset international relations. Besides the obvious aim of creating a trade surplus, the Commodity Act had another protective measure specifically to reduce exports of timber so they could be secured for iron production, which was Sweden's main export and where they had historically held a strong monopoly.

==== Hats in power - Government subsidized manufacturing industries ====
Once the Hats came into power, there was a stronger push towards mercantilism. Prime among their goals was establishing a strong Swedish manufacturing industry. The Riksdag established a Manufacturing Office in 1739. They also legislated free land for factories, tariff exemptions of specific imported raw materials and machines, and tax exemptions for factory owners and employees. For instance, in 1741 they wrote off a loan worth 413000 myntsedlar (equivalent to approximately 10,000,000 US Dollars in 2015) for Jonas Alströmer's Alingsås factory. They also encouraged home production, as merchants co-ordinated with peddlers to organize merchandise of homemade products. This push for manufacturing came at a cost, however, mostly to the consumers who were paying higher taxes to receive goods that were of lower quality than imported ones.

==== Anders Chydenius ====
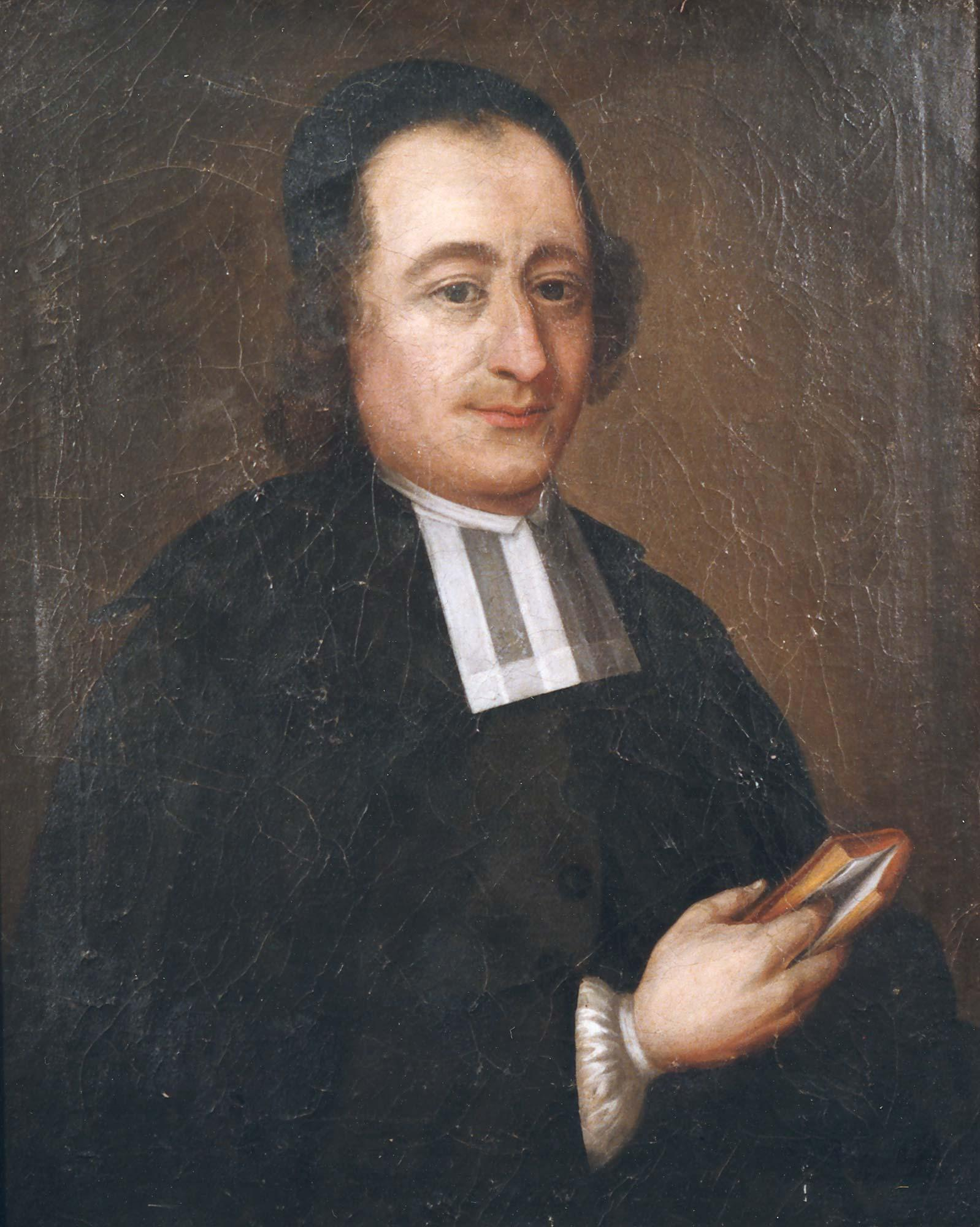
Anders Chydenius was a pioneer of trade policy reform during the Age of Liberty

There were opponents to mercantilism in the Riksdag, most famous of whom was Anders Chydenius. Chydenius, a member of the clergy, considered himself a pupil of Anders Nordencrantz, the classical liberal who preceded him. Chydenius made his first formal critique of the old mercantilist system as a written response to a prize question put forth in 1763 by the Royal Swedish Academy of Sciences: "The cause of so many people annually emigrating from this country". His essay included attacks on, among other matters, the staple towns policy, rural trade prohibitions, manufacturing subsidies, and government export policies. This work was considered so radical and controversial that the Academy refused to publish it. In heated debates at Riksdag assemblies, Chydenius advocated free trade and laissez-faire economics a decade before Adam Smith penned The Wealth of Nations. At the Riksdag assembly of 1765-1769 Chydenius published "The Source of the Nation's Weakness" (Källan till Rikets Vanmakt), a scorching critique of mercantilism. The main subject of his criticism was the Commodity act. Chydenius argued the law created a monopoly which concentrated wealth into the hands of rich merchants based in the largest staple towns at the expense of the rest of the country. In his view, Sweden was struggling to pay for its necessary imports of salt and grain since the only nations that could export these goods as domestic produce were farther away, increasing freight costs which in turn increased prices for Swedes. On the other side of the trade balance, the value of bar iron, Sweden's most valuable export, fell as its main customers, the British and the Dutch, were unable to conduct profitable trade. He also lambasted manufacturing subsidies which diverted farmers from fields to factories. In a nation that was yet to experience a true agricultural revolution, this meant a shortage of food in towns exacerbated by the aforementioned rise in grain prices.

Chydenius' assertions line up with statistics on foreign trade from the period. Between 1738 and 1809, Sweden's total trade doubled, but exports slightly decreased due to a decrease in price of bar iron. Sweden's monopoly over the bar iron trade meant they could sell their exports at high markup; this, however, drove competition as other nations were able to undersell Sweden. The main purchaser of Sweden's iron was England. The English, no longer wanting to be dependent on Sweden's iron, sought other markets. After 1765, England imported more iron from Russia than they did from Sweden, spelling the end for Sweden's monopoly over bar iron.

Sources of British bar iron in percentage of total bar iron import
Year	Sweden	Russia	Other Countries
1699	80	-	20
1700-1709	88	-	12
1710-1719	65	-	35
1720-1729	76	2	22
1730-1739	74	13	13
1740-1749	75	16	9
1750-1759	64	27.5	8.5
1760-1769	49	44	7
1770-1779	38	57	5
1780-1789	34.5	63	2.5
1790-1799	40	58	2

==== Caps in power - Cancellation and collection of all state loans to industries ====
The Hats' grandiose financing of industry and their constant involvement in wars forced them to take several loans, amounting to a total debt of 60,000,000 kroner. Once they could no longer take loans, they flushed the economy with paper money in the hopes of redeeming it later. As it was with Baron Gortz's copper tokens, this did not work. It caused wild price fluctuation and consumers started buying durable goods to deal with the uncertainty. This financial mismanagement meant the end of the Hats, as they were ousted from government in 1765 and the Caps then took power. The Caps were in favour of deregulation and encouraging free trade, however, they went swiftly to the other economic extreme. They immediately cut off state loans to industries and forced the Riksbank collect all their credits. This led to economic downturn as industrialists were forced to sell off their machinery to pay off debts, and workers suddenly lost their jobs. Many of them had no choice but to leave the country, resulting in a small scale brain drain. It is a matter of debate whether or not the Caps' economic policy was warranted. The immediate economic effects were severely negative, but the industries swept away were mainly ones propped up by government subsidies. Older and larger factories made it through the crisis.

== The Return of Absolutism (post 1772) ==
After Gustav III reclaimed monarchic power in 1772, a new constitution was written that effectively began a second age of absolutism in Sweden. Under the laws of 1772, the king held the majority of the power and only had to consult with the Riksdag on the most pressing of matters. In the early parts of his reign. Gustav could be considered a king of his time, a so-called enlightened despot. During his reign he abolished torture and granted religious freedoms. The first of his financial reforms was fixing an error left over by the Age of Liberty. The Hats' monetary policy and the Caps' sudden borrowing restrictions had caused extreme price fluctuations. To correct this, Gustav's government bought all the old currency in its devalued state and injected the new silver riksdaler in its place. Gustav's other financial reform was continuing the progress made during the Age of Liberty in regards to trade freedoms. He further removed restrictions to trade and reduced the influence of mercantilism. Agricultural reform would follow from the early inroads made during the Age of Liberty, led this time by Rutger Maclean, leading to widespread population growth which preceded urbanization and industrialization in the mid to late 19th century.

== See also ==
- Economic History of Sweden
- History of Sweden
- Age of Liberty
- Absolute Monarchy
- Riksdag of the Estates
- Anders Chydenius
- Enlightenment
- Industrial Revolution
