= December Crisis (1768) =

Political crisis in Sweden

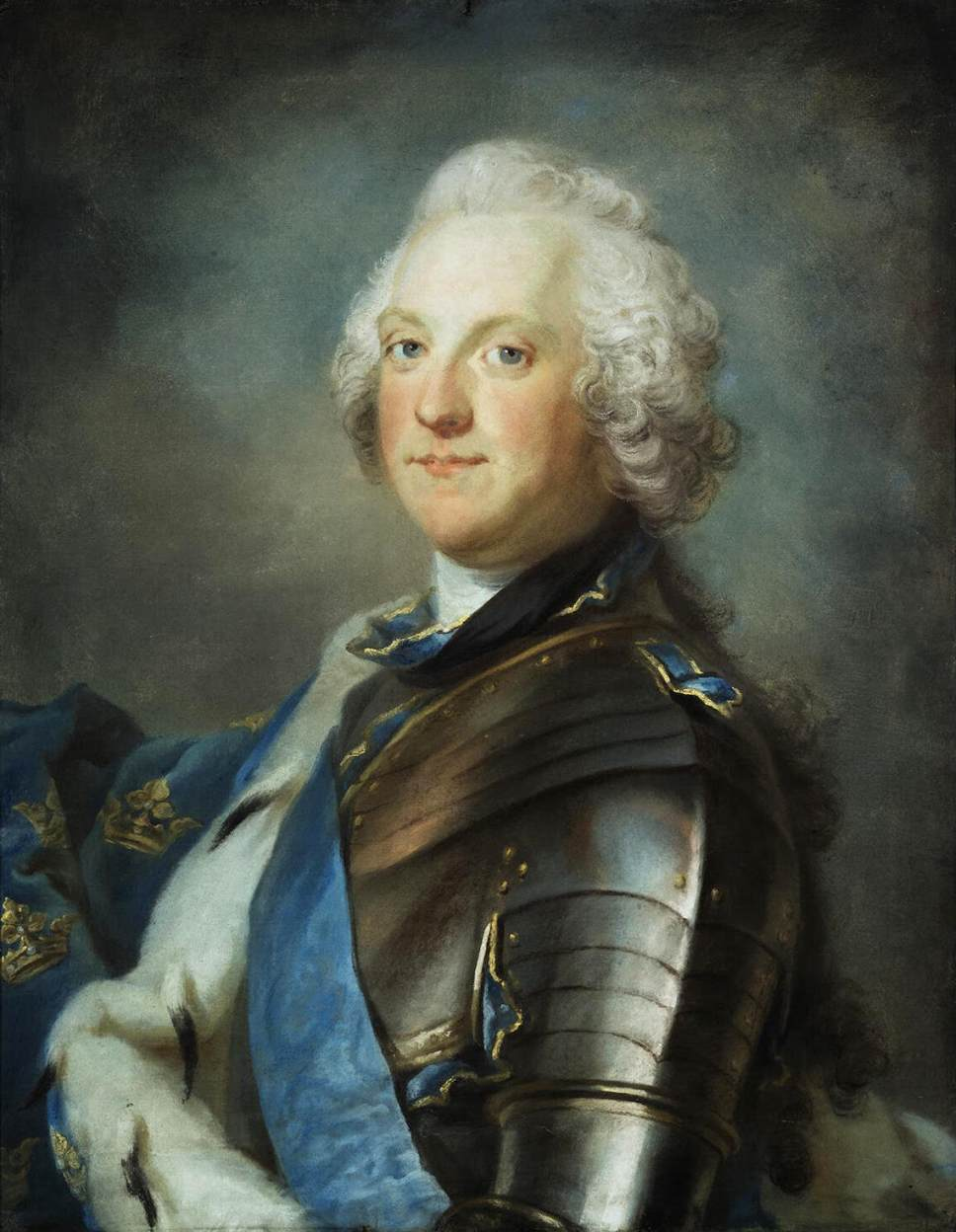
Gustaf Lundberg - Portrait of Adolf Frederick, King of Sweden - WGA13779

December Crisis (1768) (Swedish: Decemberkrisen) was a political crisis which occurred in Sweden in December 1768 when Adolf Frederick, King of Sweden, demonstrated against his limited powers by refusing to sign state documents, thereby paralyzing the government and bringing about a new Riksdag of the Estates.

== Background ==
The December Crisis is described as the only occasion when the king himself attempted to assert his power; previous attempts had always been staged by his queen, Louisa Ulrika of Prussia. In 1767, French envoy Louis Auguste Le Tonnelier de Breteuil suggested a coup to increase royal power to the Hovpartiet.

== Crisis ==
In December 1768, the king refused to sign state documents in protest to his limited power and on 15 December, the king formally resigned his throne in order to bring about the gathering of a new Riksdag, during which a reform to increase his capacity could be introduced. This created a difficult political situation, as he had thereby technically abdicated and the nation was in interregnum. The Hovpartiet suggested that the crisis could be used to stage a coup to establish absolute monarchy. The queen opposed because she did not consider the time right for such a step and advocated negotiation with the Hats (party) and the Caps (party), but at this point, the Hovpartiet for the first time turned to the Crown Prince rather than the queen; however, the crisis could not be used for a coup because the Caps party broke an agreement.

== Results ==
On 20 December the government agreed to assemble the Riksdag and promised new reforms, and the king thereby agreed to retake the throne, and thereby, the crisis was averted and the government could function again.

The Riksdag was however not assembled until 1769, and it did not give the royal house more than an increased allowance.

== See also ==
- Coup of 1756
- Revolution of 1772
