= Hovpartiet =

18th century political party in Sweden

Royal Court Party Hovpartiet
- Leaders: King Frederick I, Queen Louisa Ulrika, King Gustav III
- Founded: 1723
- Dissolved: 1772
- Headquarters: Stockholm
- Ideology: Ultra-royalism; Conservatism
- Political position: Right-wing

Louisa Ulrika of Prussia, Queen of Sweden: leader of the Hovpartiet in the mid 18th-century

Hovpartiet (Swedish: The Royal Court Party) was the name for a political group in Sweden during the Age of Liberty. Its stated objective was to strengthen the influence and power of the monarchy against the Riksdag of the Estates. It is most known in history as the force behind Queen Louisa Ulrika's Coup of 1756, but it did in fact exist in some form or another from 1723 until Gustav III's Revolution of 1772, when its unstated objective of reinstating an absolute monarchy was finally realized.

== History ==
=== First Hovpartiet ===
The first Hovparti was formed during the Riksdag of 1723, and consisted of those supporting king Frederick I of Sweden in his attempt to increase royal power and authority. The complete fiasco in this attempt, however, efficiently crushed the party.

=== Second Hovpartiet ===
After the succession of Adolf Frederick of Sweden to the throne in 1751, the royalist absolutists found a new leader in the new queen, Louisa Ulrika of Prussia, who wished to overthrow the Swedish constitution and reinstate absolute monarchy. Previously allied with the Hats (party), she broke her alliance with them in 1751 and formed a new Hovparti among her followers.

The party consisted largely of members of the aristocracy and personal friends of the royal couple and did not have a broad support among the public. They had no specific policy other than their opposition to the constitutional monarchy of 1719 and the belief in the absolute monarchy of the 17th-century Swedish Empire. There were, however, some variations among the members as to whether the change of the constitution should truly be that of an absolute monarchy or simply reforms to add more royal power within the existing constitution.

The party managed to have moderate success during the Riksdag of 1751-52. Hovpartiet participated in several attempted coups staged by queen Louisa Ulrika, the most famous one being the Coup of 1756. The failure of 1756 saw the execution of several of its leading members and offered the Hats party an opportunity to persecute its followers.

=== Third Hovpartiet ===
During the 1760s, Hovpartiet allied with the Caps (party). After the election of 1765, it allied with the defeated Hats (party). At this point, it had only followers among the nobility in the Riksdag of the Estates. During this time, it was led by Fredrik Carl Sinclair in parliament. Queen Louisa Ulrika had lost her leading position within the party after 1766 in favor of crown prince Gustav. In 1769, following the December Crisis (1768), it suggested reforms to the constitution to balance the power between monarch and parliament through an increase of royal power.

The Riksdag of 1771-72 was a great success of Hovpartiet, which was able to use the scandals of the established parties of the time, and many members of the Hats party left their party to become members of Hovpartiet. The Revolution of 1772 of Gustav III was a victory for Hovpartiet, but it also resulted in the abolition of both it and the rest of the parties of the Riksdag.

== See also ==
- Gustavian Party
- Holstein Party
- Court Party
