= National Board of Trade (Sweden) =

Agency of the Swedish Ministry of Foreign Affairs

The National Board of Trade (Swedish: Kommerskollegium, lit. 'College of Commerce') is a government agency in Sweden that answers (from 1983) to the Ministry for Foreign Affairs. The agency is located in Stockholm.

The National Board of Trade deals with foreign trade, the internal market and trade policy. The board provides the Swedish government with analyses and recommendations. It was founded in 1651.

== History ==
In 1651, Lord High Chancellor Axel Oxenstierna oversaw the establishment of Sweden's national board of trade. It drew inspiration from the English Navigation Acts. Oxenstierna also translated English economic writings that emphasized manufacturing and seafaring as means of increasing national wealth. Despite Sweden's great-power status during the period, low productivity and widespread poverty increasingly constrained its ability to finance its military ambitions.

== See also ==
- Board of Trade – Committee of the United Kingdom Privy Council
- Economic history of Sweden's Age of Liberty
- Swedish Levant Company
