= Carl Fredrik Scheffer =

Swedish count, diplomat, privy counsellor, politician and writer

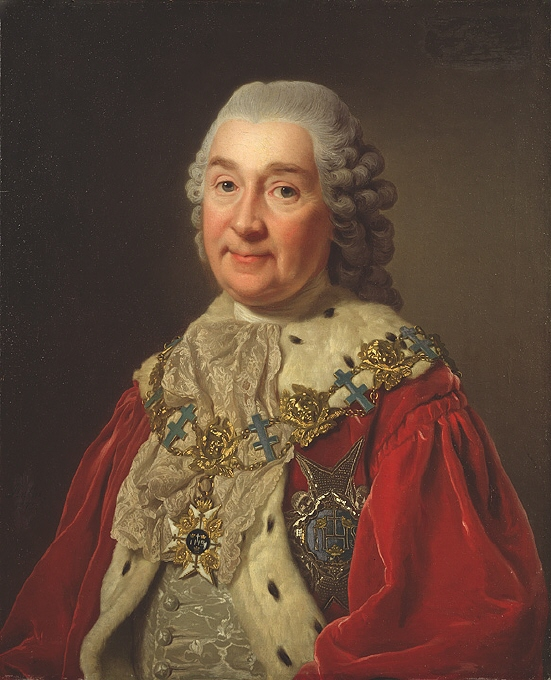
Carl Fredrik Scheffer by Alexander Roslin.

Carl Fredrik Scheffer (28 April 1715 – 27 August 1786) was a Swedish count, diplomat, privy counsellor, politician and writer. He was a Knight of the Royal Order of the Seraphim, and a Commander of the Royal Order of the Polar Star.

== Life ==
Scheffer's father Peter Scheffer was a governor. His mother was Helena Maria Ehrenstierna. He had a younger brother called Ulrik Scheffer. When he was sixteen, Carl began working in the royal office as an unpaid employee. Within a year he had begun to record the minutes of the councilors' meetings. He then left his job to travel and spent four years abroad. After returning, he became a member of the Hats party and won a seat in the Riksdag in 1738.

Scheffer was elected a member of the Swedish Academy; he was one of the 13 people who were personally appointed by Gustav III when the Academy was created, but he died before he had been formally installed as a member.

Together with his brother, he had their estate Stora Ek Manor modernised and rebuilt after French ideals.

== Works ==
- King, William (1732). The toast, an epic poem. Written in Latin by Frederick Scheffer, done into English by Peregrine O Donald, Esq; vol.I.. Dublin: printed in the year. Libris 11079733
- Minne af kongl. svenska patriotiska sällskapets ... uti en medaille, tillegnad hans excellence herr grefve Carl Fredric Scheffer ... Öfverlemnad på Töresö genom sällskapets deputerade, d. 30 august. 1777.. Stockholm, printed by Johan Georg Lange, 1777.. 1777. Libris 10560989
- Lettres particulières à Carl Gustaf Tessin 1744-1752. Handlingar / Kungl. Samfundet för utgivande av handskrifter rörande Skandinaviens historia, 0347-8505; 7. Stockholm: Samf. för utg. av handskrifter rörande Skandinaviens historia. 1982. Libris 7745554. ISBN 91-85104-09-4

== Bibliography ==
- Lettres inédites de madame Du Deffand, du président Hénault et du comte de Bulkeley au baron Carl Fredrik Scheffer, 1751-1756. Genève. 1959. SELIBR 904457
- Wolff, Charlotta (2003). "Carl Fredrik Scheffers brevväxling med franska fysiokrater". Historisk tidskrift för Finland 2003(88):2,: p. [184]-201. ISSN 0046-7596. SELIBR 9401293

Cultural offices
Preceded by First holder	Swedish Academy, Chair No 2; 1786	Succeeded by Abraham Niclas Edelcrantz
