= Age of Liberty =

Period of Swedish history from 1719 to 1772

- 1719–1772
Swedish Empire	Gustavian era
- Location: Sweden
- Monarch(s): Ulrika Eleonora; Frederick I Adolf Frederick
- Leader: Arvid Horn
- Key events: Instrument of Government (1719); Great Northern War; Russo-Swedish War; Pomeranian War

In Swedish history, the Age of Liberty (Swedish: Frihetstiden) was a period that saw parliamentary governance, increasing civil rights, and the decline of the Swedish Empire that began with the adoption of the Instrument of Government in 1719 and ended with the Revolution of 1772, Gustav III of Sweden's self-coup. This shift of power from the monarch to parliament was a direct effect of the Great Northern War.

Suffrage under the parliamentary government was not universal. Although the taxed peasantry was represented in the Parliament, its influence was disproportionately small, and commoners without taxed property had no suffrage at all.

== Great Northern War ==
Following the death of Charles XI of Sweden, his young son Charles XII became king, and in 1697, when he was only 15 years old, he was proclaimed to be of age and took over the rule from the provisional government. The states which Sweden's expansion into a great power had primarily been at the expense of, Denmark and Russia, formed a coalition with Saxony two years later with the aim of partitioning Sweden. After initial successes, Sweden's army was eventually reduced while the list of enemies grew. In a Swedish siege of Fredriksten Fortress in Norway in 1718, Charles XII was killed, after which most hostilities in the West ended. At the beginning of 1719, peace overtures were made to Britain, Hanover, Prussia, and Denmark.

By the Treaties of Stockholm on 20 February 1719 and 1 February 1720, Hanover obtained the Duchies of Bremen and Verden for herself and Southern Swedish Pomerania with Stettin for the confederate Brandenburg-Prussia. Northern Swedish Pomerania with Rügen, which had come under Danish rule during the war, was retained by Sweden. By the Treaty of Frederiksborg on 3 July 1720, peace was also signed between Denmark and Sweden. Denmark returned Rügen, Further Pomerania as far as the Peene, and Wismar to Sweden in exchange for an indemnity of 600,000 Riksdaler; in return, Sweden would pay the Sound tolls and give up her protectorate over Holstein-Gottorp. Peace with Russia was achieved in 1721. By the Treaty of Nystad, Sweden ceded Livonia, the Finnish province of Kexholm, and Viborg Castle to Russia, Ingria, and Estonia. Finland west of Viborg and north of Käkisalmi was restored to Sweden. Sweden also received an indemnity of two million Riksdaler and a solemn undertaking of non-interference in her domestic affairs.

== Age of Liberty ==
Early in 1720, Charles XII's sister, Ulrika Eleonora, who had been elected queen of Sweden immediately after his death, was permitted to abdicate in favor of her husband Frederick, the prince of Hesse, who was elected king 1720 under the title of Frederick I of Sweden. Under the new constitutional settlement, Sweden became the most liberal power on the European continent, second only to Great Britain in the assertion of Parliamentary sovereignty. All power was vested in the people as represented by the Riksdag, consisting, as before, of four distinct estates: nobles, priests, burgesses, and peasants. The conflicting interests of these four independent assemblies, who sat and deliberated apart and with their mutual jealousies, made the work of legislation exceptionally difficult. No measure could now become law until it had obtained the assent of at least three of the four estates.

Each estate was ruled by its talman, or speaker, who was now elected at the beginning of each Diet, but the Archbishop of Uppsala was, ex officio, the talman of the clergy. The lantmarskalk, or speaker of the House of Nobles, presided when the estates met in congress and also, by virtue of his office, in the secret committee. This famous body, which consisted of 50 nobles, 25 priests, 25 burgesses, and, very exceptionally, 25 peasants, possessed during the session of the Riksdag not only the supreme executive but also the supreme judicial and legislative functions. It prepared all bills for the Riksdag, created and deposed all ministries, controlled the foreign policy of the nation, and claimed and often exercised the right of superseding the ordinary courts of justice. During the parliamentary recess, however, the executive remained in the hands of the Privy Council (riksrådet), which was responsible to the Riksdag alone. The King's political role was limited to being the chair of the sixteen-member Privy Council, where he had two votes and the casting vote in the event of a tie.

== Hats and Caps ==
The policy of the Hats party was a return to the traditional alliance between France and Sweden. Chancery President, and member of the rival Caps party, Count Arvid Horn acted with the recognition of Sweden's unequal status in this alliance. The Hats, however, aimed to restore Sweden to its former position as a great power. France supported the efforts of their ally to become a stronger military power and thus provided financial support to the Hats.

The Hats initiated war with Russia. The unstable European political situation due to the almost simultaneous deaths of Charles VI, Holy Roman Emperor and Empress Anne of Russia seemed to favor the Hats' schemes. Despite the protests of the Caps, a project for the invasion of Russian Finland was rushed through the premature Riksdag of 1740. On 20 July 1741, war was formally declared against Russia; a month later, the Diet was dissolved, and the lantmarskalk set off to Finland to take command of the army. The first major battle occurred six months after the declaration of war when the Russians routed the Swedes in Finland at Lappeenranta and captured the fortress. Neither side had major offensive achievements in the following six months, during which time the Swedish generals made a "tacit truce" with the Russians through the mediation of the French ambassador at Saint Petersburg. By the time that the "tacit truce" had come to an end the Swedish forces were so demoralized that the mere rumor of a hostile attack prompted a retreat to Helsinki. By the end of the year, the majority of Finland was held by Russia. The Swedish fleet was struck by an epidemic, and thus contributed little to the war.

The Hats avoided a motion for an inquiry into the conduct of the war by shifting the focus of the Riksdag to the issue of succession. Queen Ulrike Eleonora of Sweden had lately died childless and King Frederick was old. Negotiations were thus opened with the new Russian empress, Elizabeth of Russia, who agreed to restore the greater part of Finland if her cousin, Adolph Frederick of Holstein, were elected successor to the Swedish crown. The Hats took the opportunity to recover the lost lands, as well as a bit of their own prestige. By the Treaty of Åbo on 7 May 1743 the terms of the empress were accepted and only the small part of Finland which lay beyond the Kymi River was retained by Russia.

=== Arvid Horn ===
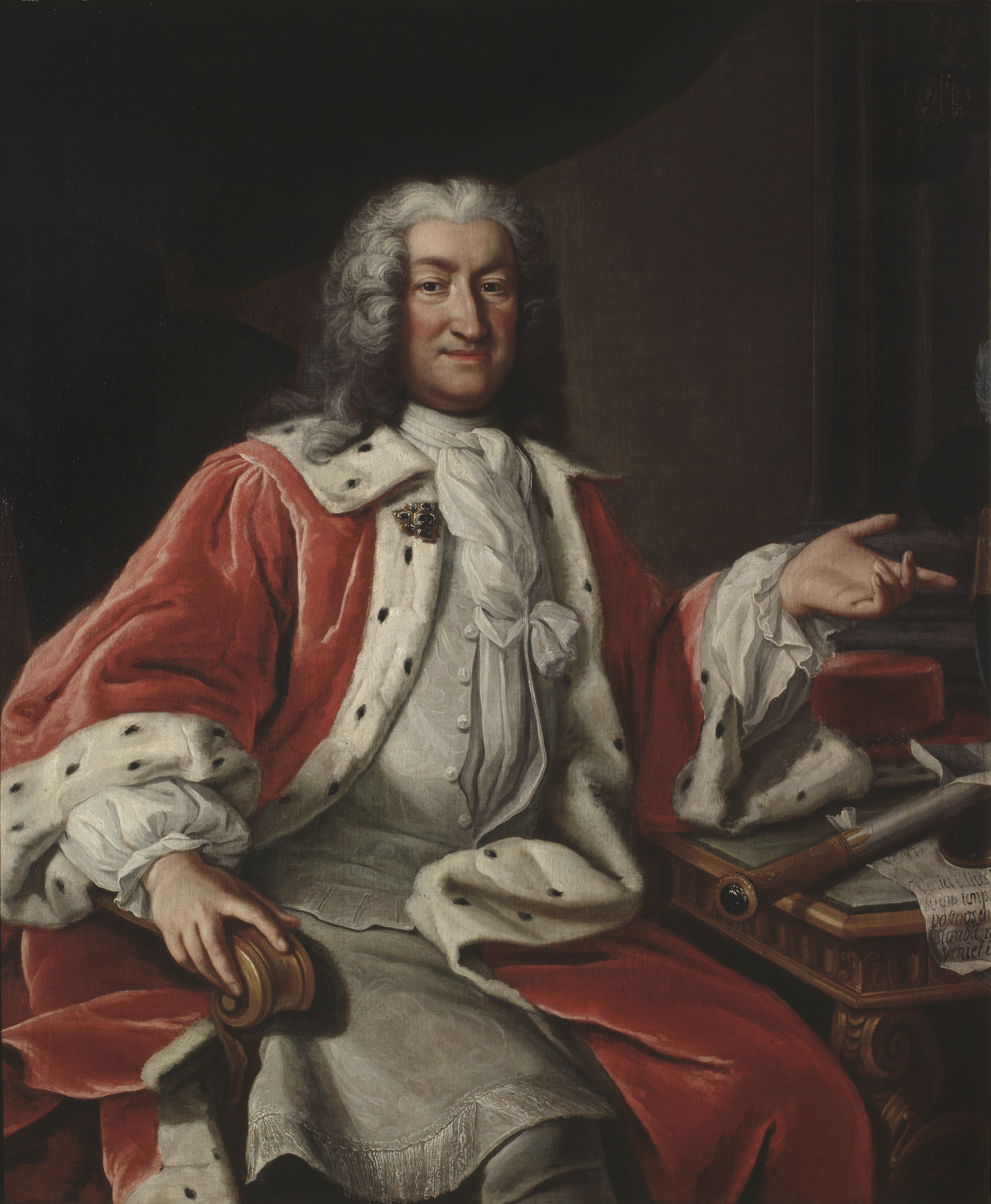
Arvid Horn, President of the Privy Council Chancellery

Since 1719, following the decline of dominant territorial families, the nobility increasingly comprised smaller landholders who formed a political opposition. Led by figures such as Count Carl Gyllenborg and Count Carl Gustaf Tessin, this group opposed the cautious foreign policy of the governing administration, which prioritized maintaining peace. The opposition labeled the government's supporters "Night-caps" (later shortened to "Caps")to criticize their perceived timidity. In response, members of the opposition adopted the term "Hats," referencing the three-cornered hat worn by officers, to symbolize their stance.

These epithets instantly caught the public fancy and had already become party badges when the estates met in 1738. This Riksdag was to mark another turning-point in Swedish history. In the War of the Polish Succession between 1733–1738 Sweden supported Stanisław Leszczyński against August III of Poland. The Hats carried everything before them, and the aged Horn, who had served thirty-three years, was finally compelled to retire from the scene.

== Pomeranian War ==
Encouraged by Louisa Ulrika of Prussia, Frederick the Great's sister, King Adolf Frederick of Sweden (reigned 1751–1771) supported a rebellion to restore the privileges of the monarchy. The attempted monarchical revolution, planned by the queen and a few devoted young nobles in 1756, was easily crushed, with Adolf Frederick nearly losing the throne in response.

That same year, the Hats saw a blow to their foreign policy. At the instigation of France, Sweden entered into the Seven Years' War, which proved disastrous. The French subsidies, which might have sufficed for a shorter, six weeks campaign (it was generally assumed that the king of Prussia would give little trouble to a European coalition), proved inadequate. After five unsuccessful campaigns, the Hats were forced to make peace, with Sweden having lost approximately 40,000 men. When the Riksdag met in 1760, Hat leaders managed to avoid impeachment after a session lasting twenty months, and the Hat government was bolstered for an additional four years. However, the Caps soon seized power in a meeting of the estates in 1765. The Cap leader, Ture Rudbeck, was elected marshal of the Diet over Frederick Axel von Fersen, the Hat candidate, by a large majority; and, out of the hundred seats in the secret committee, the Hats succeeded in getting only ten.

The Caps quickly ordered a budget report to be made, finding fraud on the part of the Hat government resulting in a large increase in the national debt and a depreciation of the note circulation to one-third of its face value. This report led to an all-round retrenchment, earning the parliament the nickname "Reduction Riksdag". The Caps succeeded in reducing the national debt, reducing wealth of the nobility in order to replenish the empty exchequer, and establishing an equilibrium between revenue and expenditure. The Caps also introduced additional reforms, the most remarkable of which was the liberty of the press in 1766. In foreign policy, the parliament also allied Sweden with Russia to counter the influence of France.

Although no longer a great power, Sweden still took on many of the responsibilities of a great power, and, despite losing value, the prospect of a Swedish alliance still held weight. Sweden's particular geographical position made it virtually invulnerable for six months out of the twelve, and its Pomeranian possessions provided easy access to the Holy Roman Empire. Additionally, to the east, its Finnish frontier was close to the Russian capital at Saint Petersburg.

Neutrality, a relative commitment to defensive alliances, and commercial treaties with the maritime powers, became the basis of the older Caps' foreign policy. However, the Hats' relationship with France in the north drove the younger Caps to seek an alliance with Russia. This policy backfired, as France's distance to Sweden had left Sweden outside the territorial ambitions of France. Russia, on the other hand, saw Swedish land as a potential area of expansion. The 1772 Partition of Poland included a secret clause requiring the contracting powers to uphold the existing Swedish constitution as the swiftest means of subverting Swedish independence; and an alliance with the credulous Caps, or "the Patriots" as they were known in Russia, guaranteeing their constitution, was a corollary to this agreement.

The domination of the Caps was short-lived. The general distress caused by their drastic reforms had found expression in pamphlets criticizing the Cap government, which were protected under the new press laws. The senate retaliated with an order, which the king refused to sign, declaring that all complaints against the austerity measures of the last Riksdag should be punished with fine and imprisonment. The king, at the suggestion of the crown prince, urged the senate to quickly summon a Riksdag in order to relieve the national distress, but was refused, leading the king to abdicate. This resulted in the December Crisis (1768), leaving Sweden without a regular government between December 15–21, 1768. Eventually, the Cap senate yielded and the estates were called for 19 April 1769.

On the eve of the contest there was a general assembly of the Hats at the French embassy, where the Comte de Modêne furnished them with 6,000,000 livres in return for a promise to reform the Swedish constitution to increase the powers of the monarchy. On the other hand, a Russian minister became kingdom's treasurer and a counsellor for the Caps. In return, the Caps openly threatened to use Russian force to punish their detractors, and designated Norrköping, instead of Stockholm, as the place of meeting for the Riksdag due to the city being more accessible to the Russian fleet. It quickly became evident that the Caps had misstepped, and when the Riksdag met at Norrköping on 19 April, they found themselves in a minority in all four estates. In the contest for speaker of the Riksdag (Lantmarskalk), the leaders of the two parties were again pitted against each other. The results of the previous Diet were exactly reversed, with von Fersen defeating Rudbeck by 234 votes, despite Russia spending at least 90,000 Riksdaler to secure the election of the latter.

A joint note presented to the estates by the Russian, Prussian and Danish ministers protested the result, in menacing terms, against any "reprisals" on the part of the triumphant faction, hastened the fall of the government. The Cap senate resigned en masse to escape impeachment, and an exclusively Hat ministry took its place. On 1 June, the "Reaction Riksdag", as it was generally called, withdrew to the capital; and the French ambassador and the crown prince Gustav called upon the new Privy Councillors to redeem their promise to reform the constitution. When, at the end of the session, they half-heartedly brought the matter forward, but it did not proceed, with the Reaction Riksdag disbanding on 30 January 1770.

== Freedom of the press ==
As a result of the party system, demands for freedom of the press came from many quarters, usually inspired by Great Britain. The first proposal to abolish prior censorship was put forward in the Riksdag in 1727 and was followed by many more in the following decades. However, it was not until 1766, after careful preparation, that a freedom of the press ordinance was issued which not only abolished censorship but also provided clear legal protection for writings on political issues and other subjects. However, the Lutheran religion could not be questioned, and prior review of theological writings remained in place. The Freedom of the Press Act also brought with it extensive public access to official documents. All public documents, including government minutes, were now open to inspection and could be published, provided they did not concern secret foreign affairs.

== Economy ==
The Great Northern War left Sweden in a state of economic and demographic ruin at the start of the Age of Liberty. This period brought economic and social upheaval as well as industrial development. However, by the time the Age of Liberty ended in 1772, Sweden was by all objective measures a weaker nation than it was during its "Era of Great Power." Its land was diminished, its monopoly over the bar iron trade was gone, and it was lagging behind in the race towards early industrialisation. The decline can be attributed both to fiscal, monetary and executive policy errors by the various Riksdag parties in power, as well as to technological and economic shifts which allowed Sweden's rivals and neighbours get ahead on the global stage. However, the agricultural reforms, the early industrial developments and the gradual change from mercantilism to free trade which occurred during this period and pioneered the path for Sweden's agricultural revolution in the 1790s and eventual large scale industrialization in the mid to late 19th century.

== See also ==
- History of Finland
- History of Germany
- History of Russia
