= Stora Ek Manor =

Coordinates: 58°36′56″N 13°48′58″E

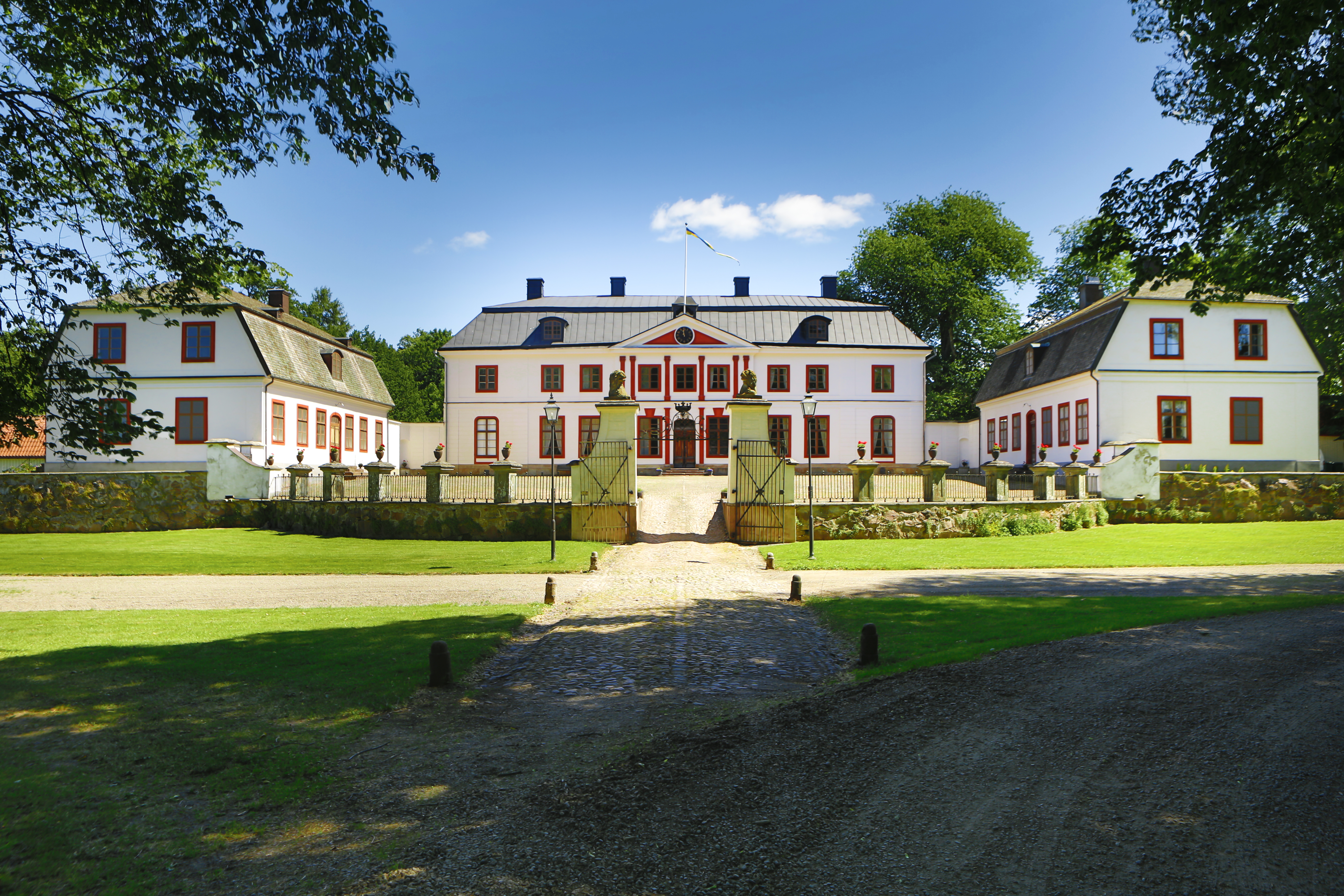
Stora Eks herrgård

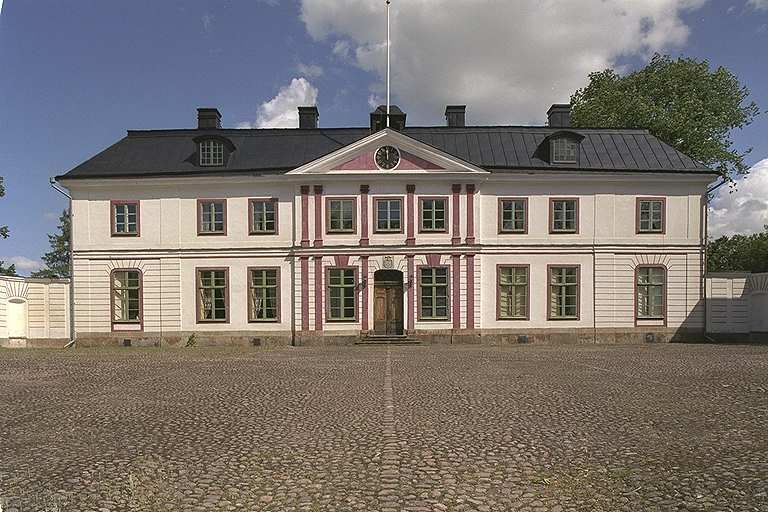
Manor House

Stora Ek Manor (Swedish: Stora Eks herrgård) is a manor house in Mariestad Municipality, Sweden. The manor is privately owned.

== History ==
The first recorded owner of the estate was a squire named Erik Tyrgilsson who owned Stora Ek during the second half of the 15th century. The estate was formed in the late 16th century. Until the 18th century the manor consisted of wooden structures. It derives its present appearance from reconstruction works carried out during the 18th century.

In 1724, Peter Scheffer (1657-1731), chief justice president and governor of Skaraborg County, became the owner of Stora Ek. In 1754, ownership pasted to his sons Carl Fredrik Scheffer (1715-1786) and Ulrik Scheffer (1716-1799). Both brothers also held high positions within the government. Planning and construction work for a new manor site was started around 1757. Subsequently rebuilt, the manor house became more representative of their social status. The main building and the kitchen wing were finished in 1768. Construction work was then halted until 1778, and the entire reconstruction scheme was not finished until 1782, when Ulrik Scheffer (who was the sole owner since his brother became part owner of Tyresö estate in 1766) erected a memorial stone in the park, celebrating the project.

Carl Fredrik Adelcrantz (1716–1796) is often highlighted as the architect, while some sources mention Jean Eric Rehn (1717-1793). Drawings and testimonies provide conflicting information. Quite possibly both contributed to the designs. The architecture and the gardens followed the prevailing French fashion.

== Gallery ==
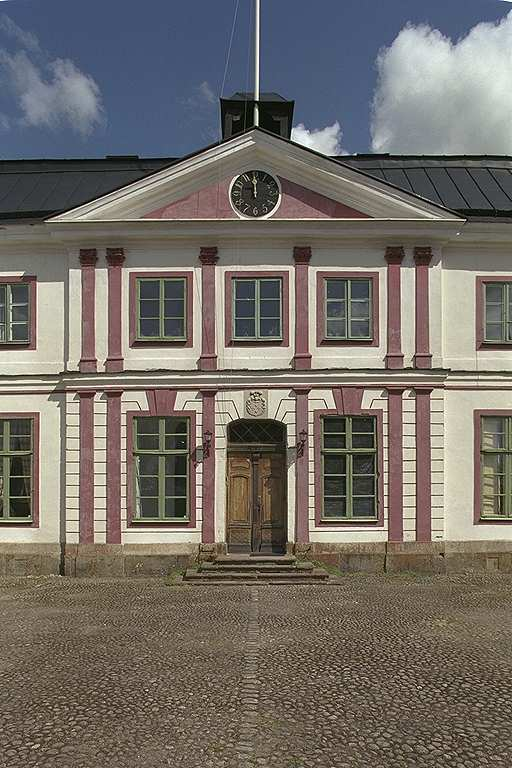

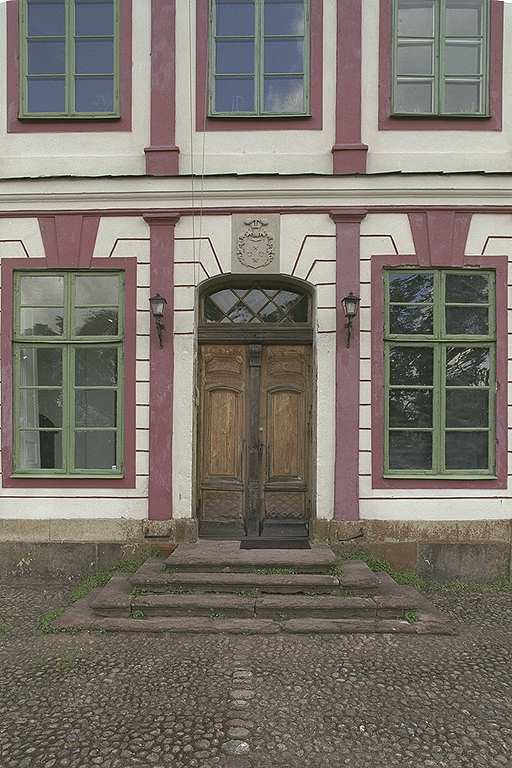

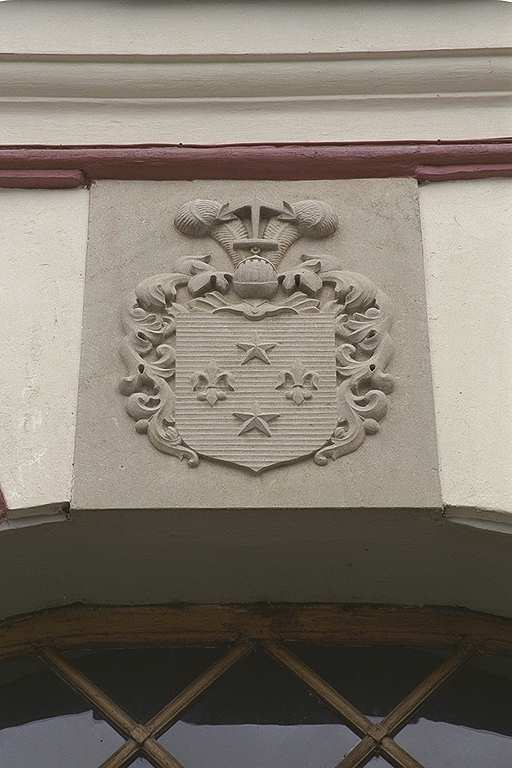

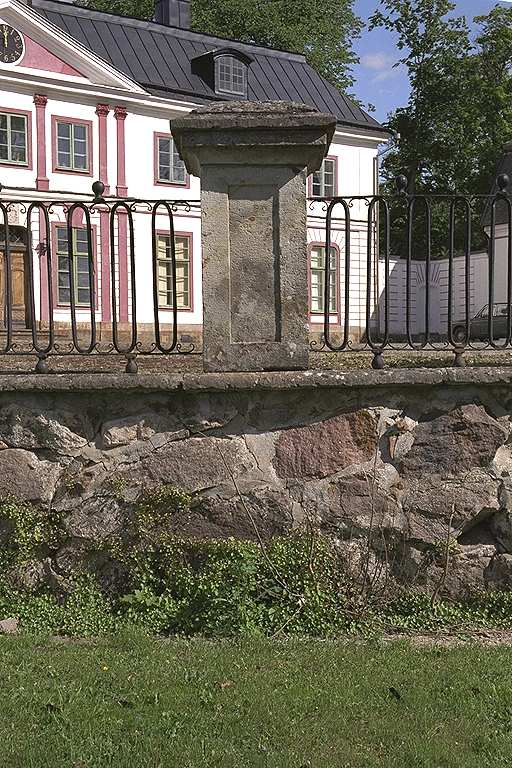
