= Anders Johan von Höpken =

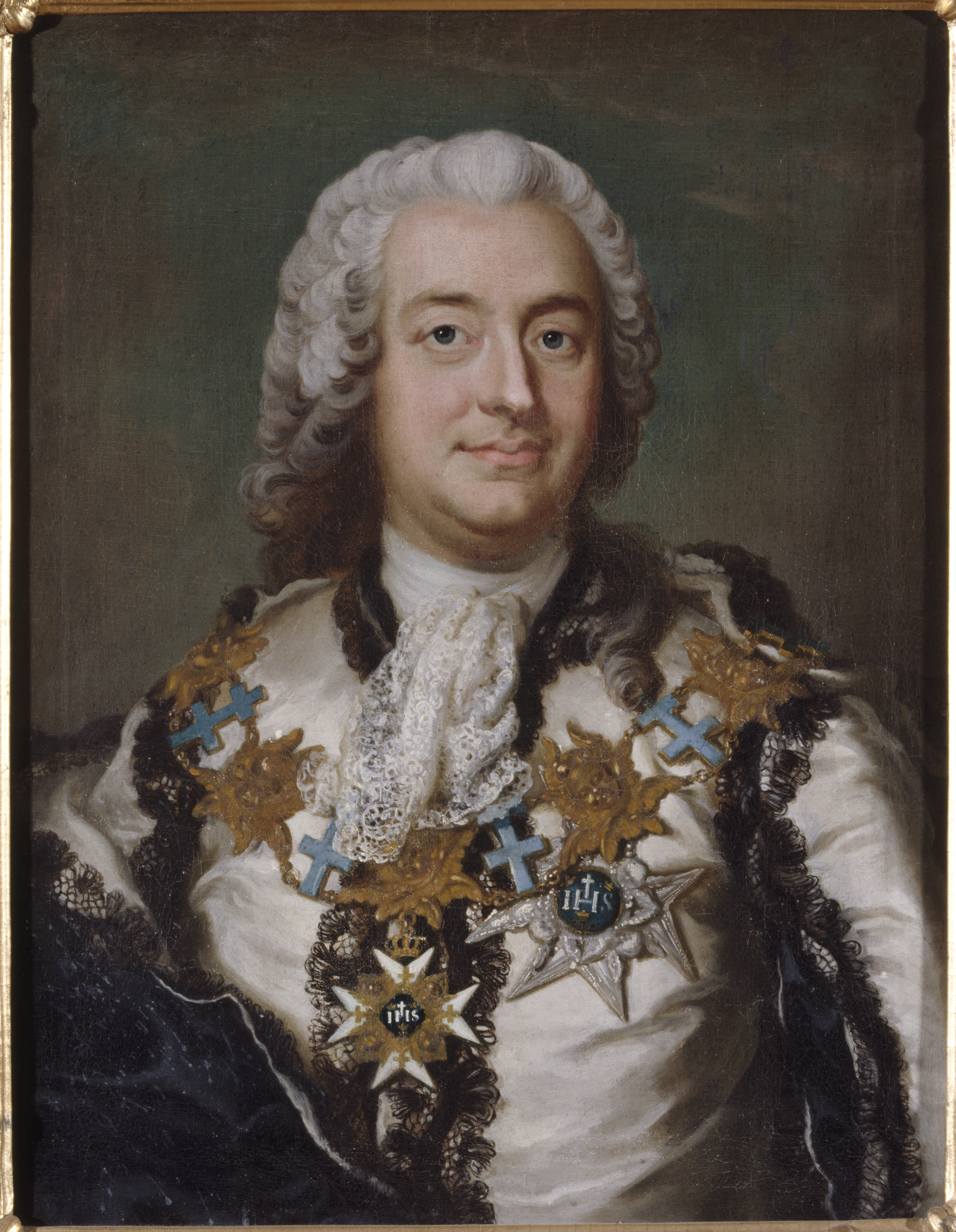
Anders Johan von Höpken

Count Anders Johan von Höpken (31 March 1712 – 9 May 1789), Swedish statesman, was the son of Daniel Niklas von Höpken, one of Arvid Horn's most determined opponents and a founder of the Hat party.

The younger Höpken was born in Stockholm. When in 1738 the Hats came into power he obtained a seat in the secret committee of the Riksdag, and during the Finnish war of 1741-42 was one of the two commissioners appointed to negotiate with Russia. During the Riksdag of 1746-1747 Höpken's influence was of the greatest importance. It was chiefly through his efforts that the estates issued a "national declaration" protesting against the arrogant attitude of the Russian ambassador, who attempted to dominate the crown prince Adolphus Frederick and the government. This spirited policy restored the waning prestige of the Hat party and firmly established their anti-Muscovite system.

In 1746 Höpken was created a Privy Councillor. In 1751 he succeeded Carl Gustaf Tessin as President of the Royal Majestys Chancellery, and controlled the foreign policy of Sweden for the next nine years. On the outbreak of the Seven Years' War, he contracted an armed neutrality treaty with Denmark (1756); but in the following year acceded to the league against Frederick II of Prussia.

During the crisis of 1760–1762, when the Hats were at last compelled to give an account of their stewardship, Höpken was sacrificed to party exigencies and retired from the Privy Council as well as from the premiership. On 22 June 1762, however, he was created a count. After the revolution of 1772 he re-entered the Privy Council at the particular request of Gustavus III, but no longer exercised any political influence. His caustic criticism of many of the royal measures was not welcomed, and in 1780 he retired into private life. He died in Stockholm.

Höpken's biographies and orations has earned for him the title of the Swedish Tacitus. He was one of six who founded the Royal Swedish Academy of Sciences in 1739, and when Gustavus III in 1786 established the Swedish Academy, he gave Höpken the first place in it.

Cultural offices
Preceded by First holder	Swedish Academy, Seat No.1; 1786–1789	Succeeded by Nils Philip Gyldenstolpe
