= Caps (party) =

Political party in 18th century Sweden

Caps mössorna
- Leaders: Arvid Horn, Magnus Beronius, Clas Frietzcky
- Founded: 1737
- Dissolved: 1772
- Headquarters: Stockholm
- Ideology: Liberalism; Whiggism; Agrarianism; Russophilia
- Political position: Centre-left
- Religion: Lutheranism

The Caps (Swedish: mössorna) were a political faction during the Age of Liberty (1719–1772) in Sweden. The primary rivals of the Caps were known as the Hats. The Hats are actually responsible for the Caps' name, as it comes from a contraction of Night-cap, a name used to suggest that the Caps were the soft and timid party. The Caps represented mostly peasants and clergymen.

== Policy ==
The foremost representative of the Age of Liberty, de facto leader of government and of the Caps from 1719 to 1738 was the Chancery President, Count Arvid Horn. Horn reversed the traditional policy of Sweden by keeping the Kingdom of France at a distance and drawing near to Russia. Thus a twenty years' war was succeeded by a twenty years' peace, during which the nation recovered so rapidly from its wounds that it began to forget them.

The Riksdag of 1738 was to mark a turning-point in Swedish history, the Hats carried everything before them, and the aged Horn was finally compelled to retire from a scene where, for thirty-three years, he had played a leading part. For the next twenty five years the Hats did dominate government, with disastrous results where the country was plunged into two costly and ill-advised wars.

At the Riksdag in 1765, the Caps returned to government and they struck at once at the weak point of their opponents by ordering a budget report to be made, and it was speedily found that the whole financial system of the Hats had been based upon reckless imprudence and the wilful misrepresentation and that the only fruit of their long rule was an enormous addition to the national debt and a depreciation of the note circulation to one third of its face value. This revelation led to an all-round retrenchment, carried into effect with a drastic thoroughness which has earned for this parliament the name of the "Reduction Riksdag". The Caps succeeded in reducing the national debt, half of which was transferred from the pockets of the rich to the empty exchequer, and establishing some sort of equilibrium between revenue and expenditure. They also introduced a few useful reforms, the most remarkable of which was the liberty of the press in 1766. However, their most important political act was to throw their lot definitely in with the Russian Empire, so as to counterpoise the influence of France.

== Majority leaders ==
These representatives of the Caps were elected as Lantmarskalk (speakers) of the Riksdag of the Estates, signifying a parliamentary majority.

- Arvid Horn (1720, 1726, 1731)
- Swen Lagerberg (1723)
- Mattias Alexander von Ungern-Sternberg (1742, 1746)
- Thure Gustaf Rudbeck (1765)

== See also ==
- Privy Council of Sweden
- Hovpartiet
