= Simonetti (surname) =

Simonetti is an Italian surname. Notable with this surname include:

- Members of the Simonetti family, an Italian noble Banking family with origins in Tuscany, including:
  - Annibale Simonetti, Prince, Roman nobleman from nineteenth-century
  - Antonio Hercolani Fava Simonetti (1183–1962), member of the Sovereign Military Order of Malta
  - Antonio Sanseverino (1477–1543), Italian Roman Catholic cardinal and bishop.
  - Claudio Simonetti (born 1952), Brazilian-born Italian musician and film composer
  - Fra' Gherardo Hercolani Fava Simonetti (born 1941), Grand Commander of the Order of Malta
- Achille Simonetti (sculptor) (1838–1900), sculptor in Australia
- Alfonso Simonetti (1840–1892), Italian painter, mainly of the Romantic-style
- Attilio Simonetti (1843–1925), Italian painter and Antiquarian
- Carlo Simonetti (1903 – unknown), Italian modern pentathlete
- Ellen Simonetti (born 1974), former American flight attendant
- Enrico Simonetti (1924–1978), Italian pianist, composer, conductor, and television and radio presenter
- Frank Simonetti (born 1962), retired American professional ice hockey defenseman
- Giacomo Simonetti (or Simoneta; 1475–1539), Italian Roman Catholic bishop and cardinal
- Giovanni Paolo Simonetti, a pseudonym of German composer Winfried Michel (born 1948)
- Jennifer Simonetti-Bryan, American wine educator, consultant and Master of Wine
- Lenny Simonetti (1919–1973), American football tackle
- Loredana Simonetti (1930–2026), Italian middle-distance runner
- Manlio Simonetti (1926–2017), Italian scholar of Patristics and the history of Biblical interpretation
- Mauro Simonetti (born 1948), Italian professional road bicycle racer
- Pasquale Simonetti (1926–1955), Italian criminal of the Camorra
- Ryan Simonetti, American professional skateboarder
- Vito Simonetti (1903–unknown), Argentine fencer

== See also ==
- Simone (surname)
- Simonini (surname)
