= Alessandro De Angelis =

Alessandro De Angelis may refer to:

- Alessandro De Angelis (Jesuit)
- Alessandro De Angelis (astrophysicist)
