= Simonetti family =

Italian noble family

Simonetti
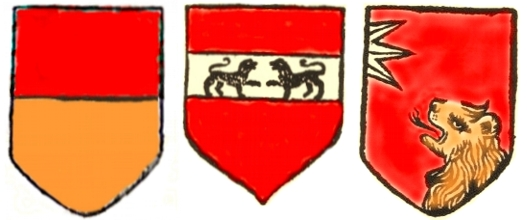
- Current region: Worldwide
- Earlier spellings: Syminetti, Siminetti, Simonecti, Simoneth, della Sannella, Simmonette, Simonette
- Origin: Tuscany
- Titles: Count, Baron, Prince, Consul (representative), Senator, Marquis

The Simonetti family is an Italian noble family with origins in Tuscany. During the 12th century different branches in Florence, Terni, Lucca, Pistoia and Pescia developed. Other famous branches of this family were established in Jesi, Palermo, Milan and Bologna.

Members of this family have held different titles since the Middle Ages, among them: Lords of Jesi, Princes of Musone, marquis, Barons in the kingdom of Naples and Rome, counts in the kingdom of Italy and Bologna, senators and Consuls of Rome and the Kingdom of Italy. The Simonetti also held positions in the Republic of Florence and the Republic of Lucca, among them priori of the signoria, gonfaloniere, captains, members of the council of the elders and the leadership of the Guelph party.

== Origin of the family ==
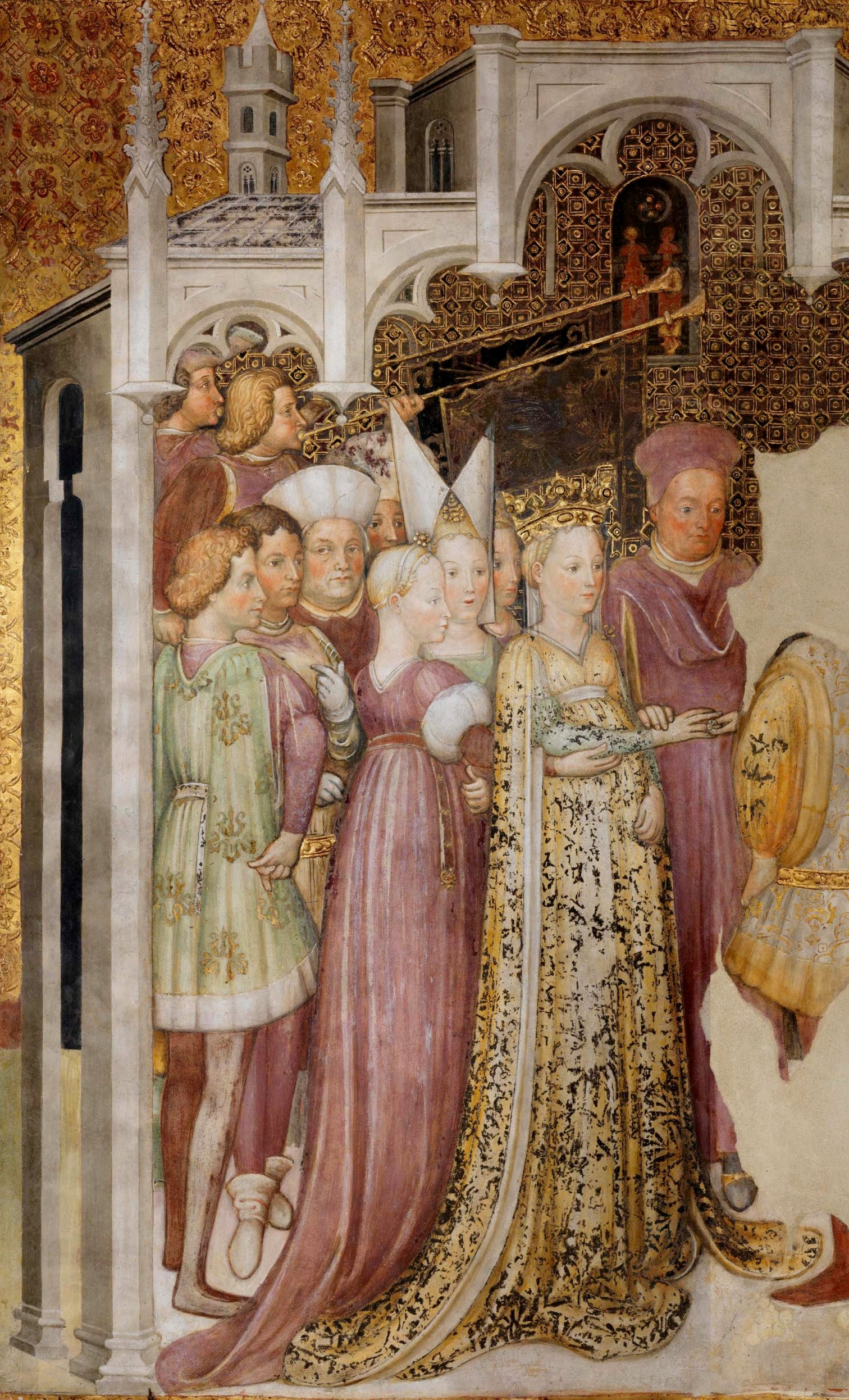
Theudelinda in a fresco by Zavattari. Theudelinda was the sister of Aripert I.

According to Eugenio Gamurrini and Ludovico Jacobilli the Simonetti from Terni, Milan, Florence, Jesi, Lucca, Osimo, Cingoli, had a single origin. Gamurrini linked the Florentine branch of the family to medieval Lucca but could not find the common ancestor that linked the Simonetti from Tuscany to the Simonetti from Jesi. He pointed to other facts that indicated the connection and the earlier research done by Jacobilli. According to Jacobilli the Simonetti branches were all descendants of a single line of Lombard barons that held fiefs in central Italy. Gamurrini in his Istoria genealogica delle famiglie nobili Toscane et Umbre studied manuscripts that linked the Simonetti of Milan, Lucca and Florence to Teuprando, a Lombard lord living in Lucca and a descendant of Aripert I, King of the Lombards (see Bavarian dynasty). Other noble families from Lucca also recognized Teuprando as their ancestor, including the Rolandinghi, Soffredinghi, and Opezinghi. All these families held control of vast areas in the Garfagnana region and held castles around the Lombard city of Barga.

Other historians such as Lord Vernon were more conservative in their studies and researched documentation up to the beginning of the 13th century, still older documentation survived including documents related to Ranerio Simonecti (Raniero Simonetti), a wealthy nobleman who was alive in 1188 and who was also mentioned by E. Gamurrini. Vernon also studied the family's lordship of parts of the Val d’ Elsa and the castle of Colle.

According to Villani the family was forced to renounce all its titles in Florence and was reduced to popolani (common citizens) for a short time. The same happened in Lucca, by the beginning of the 15th century they had temporarily lost all prerogatives of nobility in Lucca and Florence, however were still recognized as patricians.

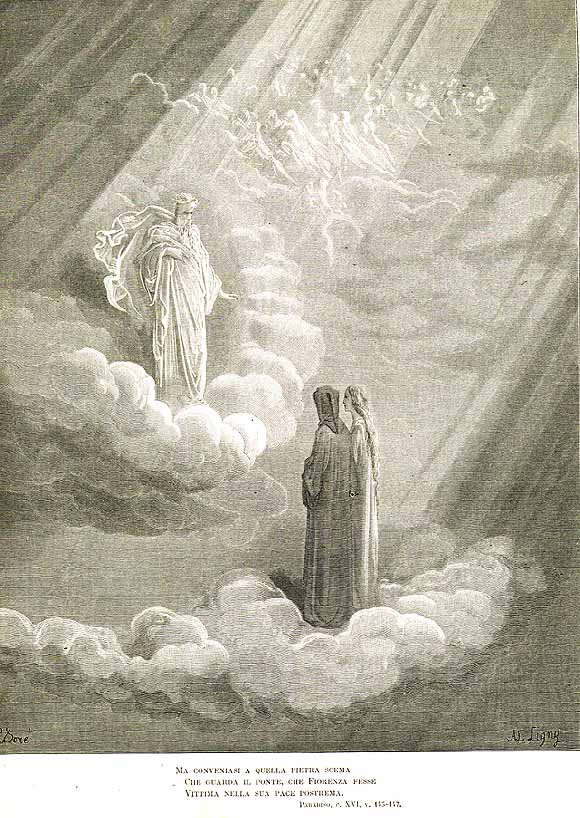
Paradiso XVI by Dore.

Dante mentions the family by della Sannella, one of the ancient names of the family. Dante placed the Simonetti family in Paradiso XVI, among the ancient noble families of Florence and Cacciaguida.

In Canto XVI of Paradiso, Dante says:

Therefore should not appear a marvellous thing
What I shall say of the great Florentines
Of whom the fame is hidden in the Past.

I saw the Ughi, saw the Catellini,
Filippi, Greci, Ormanni, and Alberichi,
Even in their fall illustrious citizens;

And saw, as mighty as they ancient were,
With him of La Sannella, him of Arca,
And Soldanier, Ardinghi, and Bostichi.

== Simonetti of Lucca ==
The Lucca branch of the family became private bankers to Edward I of England and the Pope. The family was also one of the three major banking family dynasties controlling the Riccardi Banks of Lucca. In the year 1308 the Simonetti, Quartigiani and other noble families were banned from holding public offices in Lucca. In 1317 the Quartigiani clan regained power and placed Castruccio Castracani in the office of captain-general of the Republic. After a few months in office Castruccio Castracani turned against his protectors and plotted against the Quartigiani clan, including the Simonetti branch of the family. Many members of the family were killed by Castruccio Castracani and the Simonetti family was banned from Lucca for the second time in a period of a few years. The Simonetti family returned to Lucca after the death of Castracani. Francisco Simonetti dei Quartigiani was pro Florence and influenced in the acquisition of Lucca by Florence in 1341. The Quartigiani and Simonetti were banned from holding office in Lucca for a third time after the reestablishment of the Republic in 1370. The palace and tower of the Simonetti and Quartigiani families were located in the center of Lucca, today called Quartigiani Tower or Torre delle ore (Clock Tower).

== Simonetti of Jesi ==
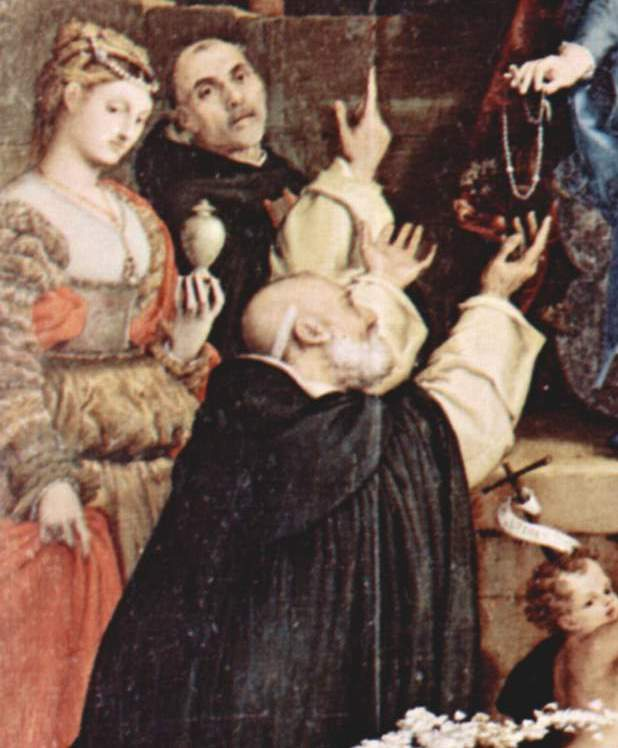
Detail of the painting Madonna del Rosario by Lorenzo Lotto. The lady in the painting is according to local tradition Sperandia Simonetti, a noblewoman from Cingoli.

The Simonetti first arrived in Jesi in the 12th century. According to Gamurrini, they were sent by emperor Barbarossa to govern Jesi as vicars. The first member of this family to appear in a document from Jesi was Raniero son of Capthio in 1201. Raniero was elected podestà of Jesi in 1216. He had four sons, named: Simonetto, Capthio, Gualtiero and Bartolo. The last three became lords of the castle of Castriccione around Cingoli. Bartolo later joined the Sylvestrines and became leader of the order. Simonetto was elected podestà of Cerlongo and was the ambassador of Jesi to the government of the Marche. Simonetto had seven sons; among them were Mercenario Simonetti, a famous condottiero, Muzzolo and Oddone Simonetti, the last two became Lords of Donazzano. By 1286 the family was very powerful. As a result, they attracted the attention of the Pope and other lords. They were at this time Lords of Castriccione, the castle of Sasso, near Serra San Quirico, the castle of Santa Maria Nuova and other possessions in the Marche. Some members of the family joined the ghibellines during the 13th century and caused a struggle with Rome. The guelphs took Jesi and confiscated the property of the Simonetti and expelled the family from Jesi. In 1298 Rinaldo Simonetti signed a treaty with other nobles swearing allegiance to pope Boniface VIII.

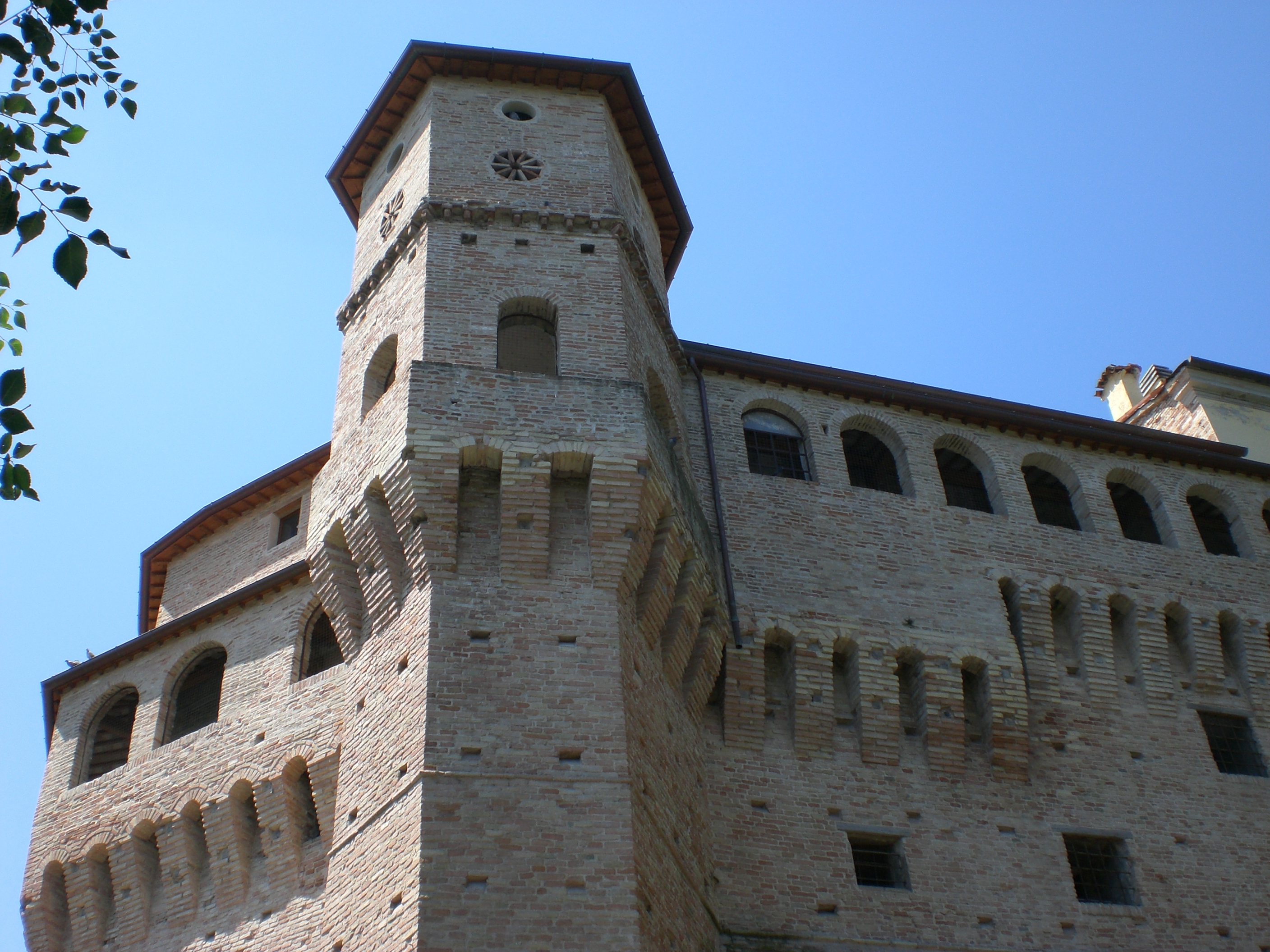
Walls of Jesi built in the 13th century.

After struggles with the Malatesta family, Tano di Baligano, and Rome, the family returned to Jesi in the 14th century where Filippo Simonetti and Lomo Simonetti were De facto Lords of Jesi. The Church later recognized the lordship of Jesi by the Simonetti and declared the family vicars of the Holy See. The lordship was confirmed a second time by Pope Boniface IX in a papal bull from May 6, 1397. The family was banished from Jesi for a second time in the 15th century. From this branch of the Simonetti originated the Simonetti from Osimo, Ancona and Cingoli. Some members of the Simonetti of Jesi migrated to Calabria, a famous member of this branch was Cicco Simonetta, secretary of Francesco Sforza. According to Crollalanza the name was modified to Simonetta in Calabria.

=== Princes of Musone ===
In a papal bull of August 9, 1805 Pope Pius VII created the title of Prince of Musone for Count Don Raniero Simonetti from Ancona and his descendants. From this branch was also Cardinal Raniero Simonetti, governor of Rome in the 18th century.

== People ==
Generic list of people named Simonetti:

From Tuscany:

- Dom Bindo Simonetti (Lucca)
- Francesco Simonetti dei Quartigiani (Lucca) - Nobleman from the house of Simonetti and Quartigiani. (14th century)
- Ser Azzolino Simonetti (Lucca) - Nobleman and banker of the English crown. (14th century)
- Ser Guido Simonetti (Lucca) - He was Podestà of Modena in 1299.
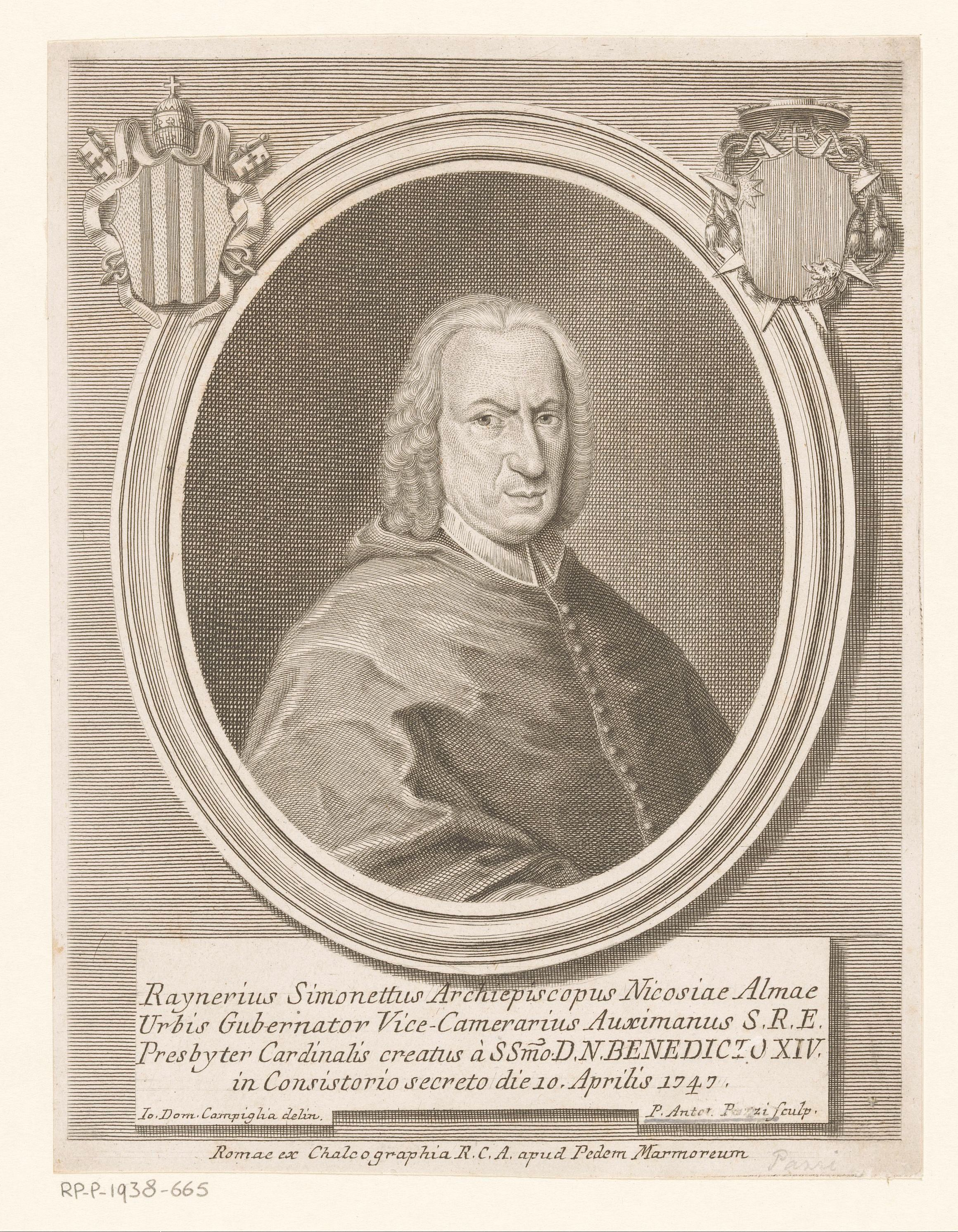
  Cardinal Raniero Simonetti from Cingoli, he used the ancient coat of arms of the Simonetti of Jesi.
- Dr. Francesco Simonetti (Castelnuovo di Garfagnana, Lucca) - Italian patriot jailed for 3 years in 1835, he was accused of being a member of Giovine Italia.
- Count Luigi Simonetti - Consul of Lucca to Russia from 1834 to 1836.
- Antonio Simonetti (Lucca)- Master goldsmith from the 18th century. He was known for his fine work using the baroque style.
- Bartolo Simonetti (Florence) - Patrician and chief of the Guelph party in Florence. He was executed by the Florentine people. (14th century)
- Raniero Simonetti - Podestà of San Gimignano and Pistoia (c. 1199–1200), was also council of Florence.

From Jesi, Osimo, Ancona and Bologna (same branch):

- Manetto Simonetti (Jesi) - Condotierro and medieval Podestà of Lucca.
- Ranieri Simonetti (Jesi) - Podestà and Captain of Bologna in 1381.
- Sciarra Simonetti (Jesi) - Podestà of Siena in 1381.
- Cardinal Raniero Simonetti (Governor of Rome, Noble of Cingoli)
- Captain-General Simonetto Simonetti (Jesi) - Commanded the papal troops and died in battle.
- Princess Isotta Simonetti (Bologna) - Princess of Musone
- Prince D. Raniero Simonetti (Bologna) - Italian senator and Prince of Musone, he was an important figure in the Italian unification.
- Prince Annibale Simonetti (Ancona)
- Antonio Hercolani-Fava-Simonetti (Bologna) - Lieutenant Grand Master of the Order of Malta (1951–1955)
- Fra' Gherardo Hercolani Fava Simonetti (b. 1941, Bologna) - He is the former Grand Commander of the Order of Malta

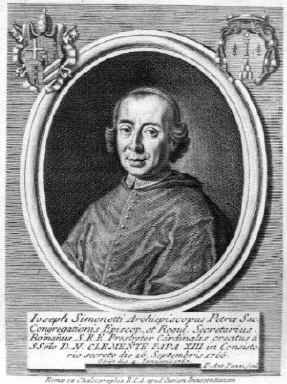
Cardinal Giuseppe Simonetti from Sabina, he used the coat of arms of the Simonetti of Sabina.

From Modena:

- Count Lorenzo Simonetti
- Cardinal Lorenzo Simonetti

From Rome:

- Marquis Alessandro Simonetti (1966-//) and daughter Valentina Simonetti (1999-//)
- Michelangelo Simonetti (1724–1781) - Papal architect, he designed numerous neoclassical buildings in Rome and the Vatican.
- Cardinal Giuseppe Simonetti (Rome)
- Marquis Filippo Simonetti (Sabina, Rome)
- Giacinta Simonetti (daughter of Marquis Simonetti, Rome. Mother of explorer Pierre Savorgnan de Brazza)

From Naples:

- Antonio Sanseverino, (ca. 1477–1543), Neapolitan branch; Cardinal Priest (1527-1537), Cardinal Bishop (1537–1543); Archbishop of Taranto (1528–1543).
- Marquis Saverio Simonetti (Napoli, Secretary of State - Sicily)

== Gallery ==
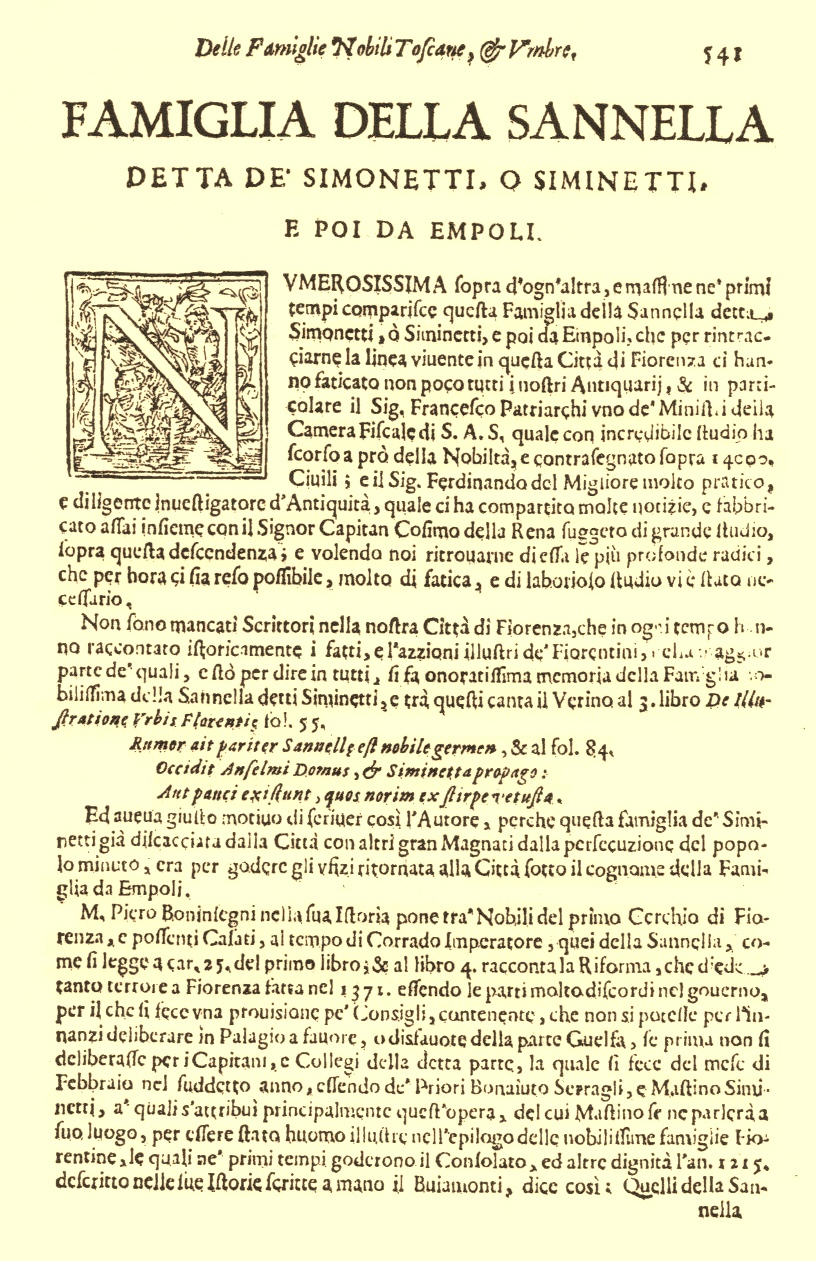
Simonetti della Sanella

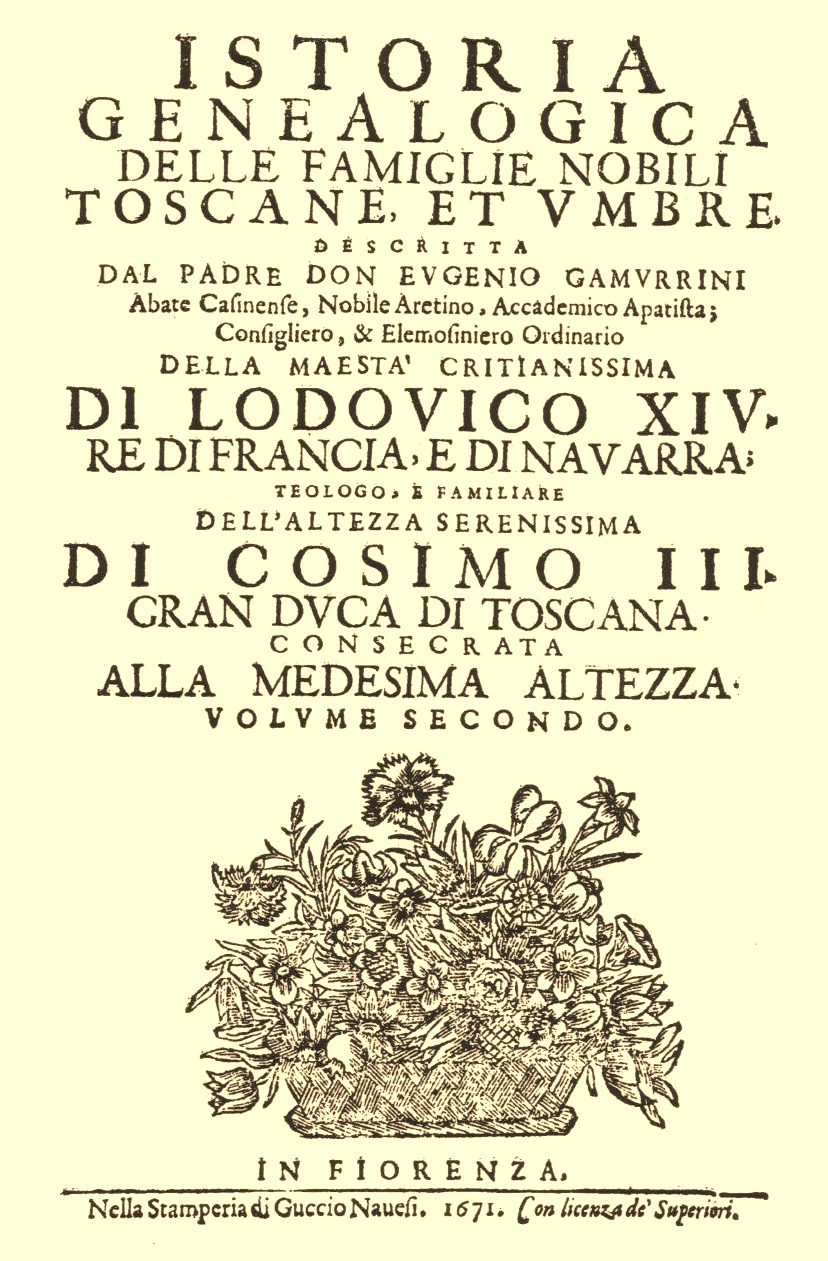
Gamurrini

Simonetti of Jesi

Simonetti of Florence

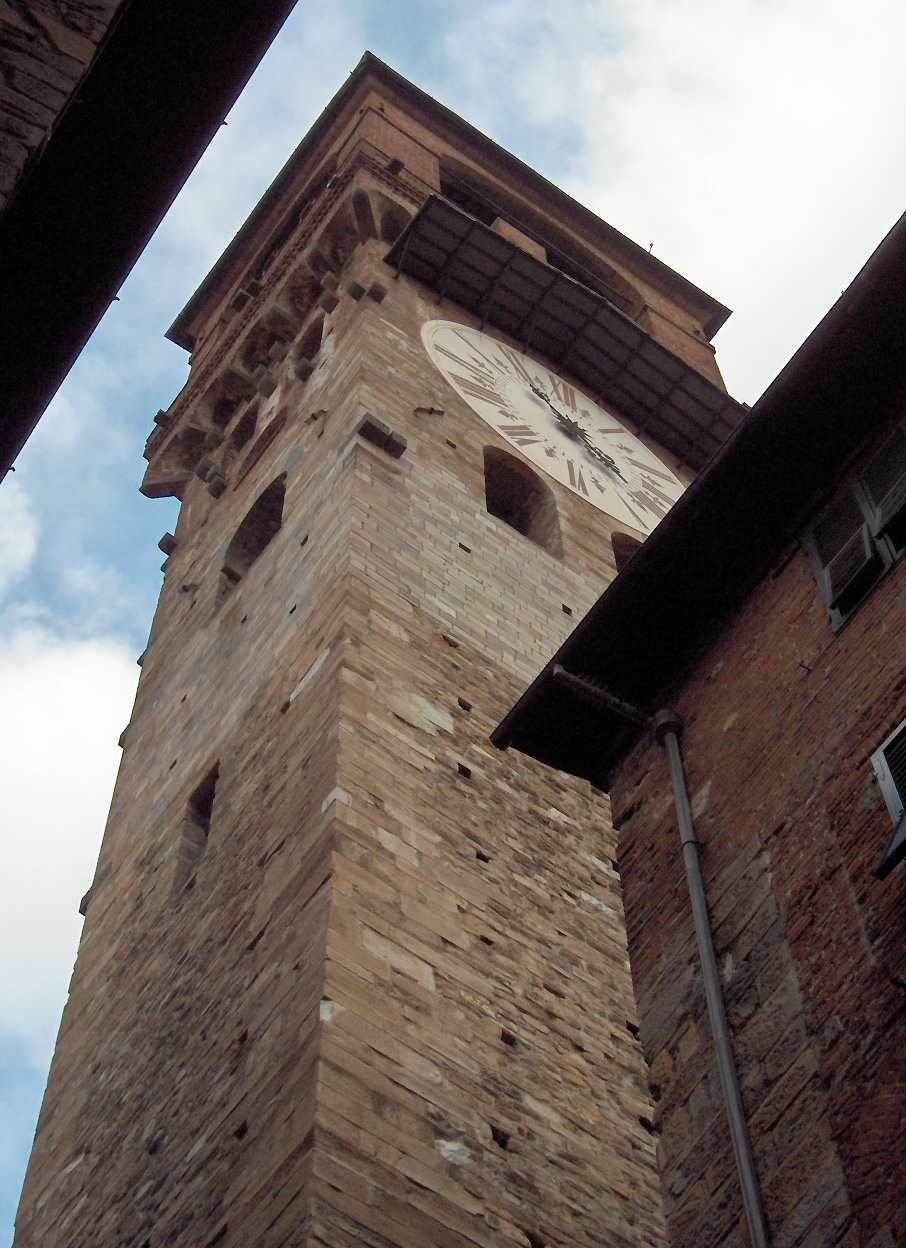
Quartigiani Tower - Lucca

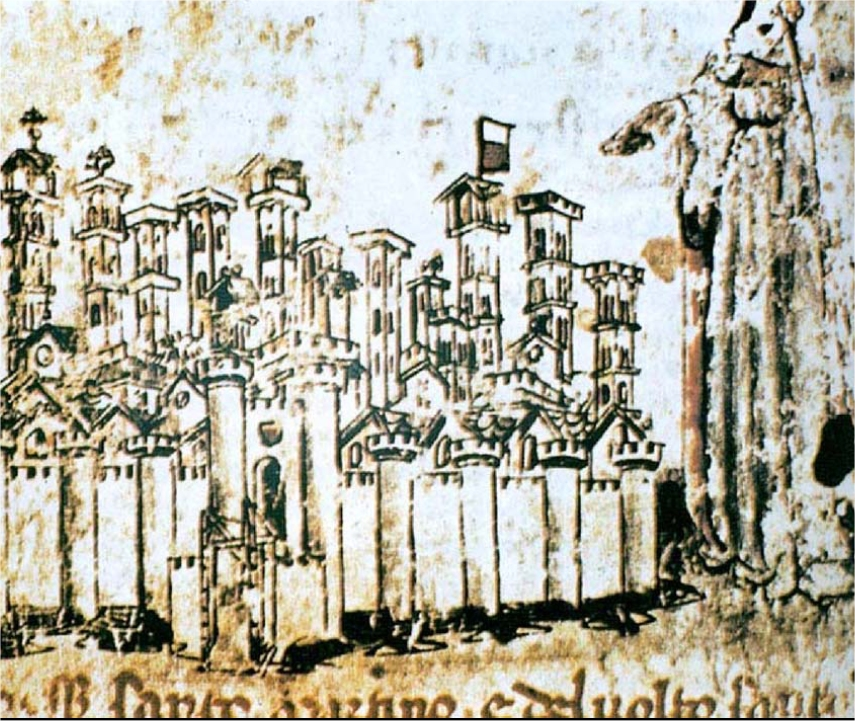
Sercambi - Medieval Lucca
