= Alessandro De Angelis (astrophysicist) =

Italian physicist

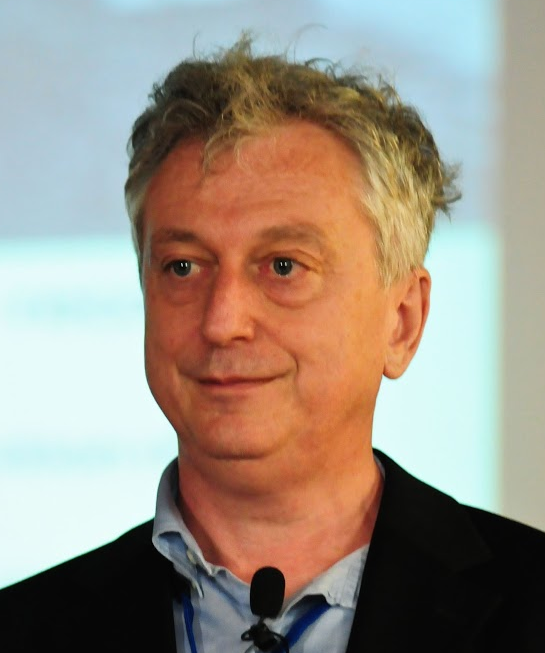
- Education: University of Padova
- Scientific career
- Workplaces: CERN; University of Udine; INFN; IST Lisboa; University of Padova

Alessandro De Angelis (born 16 August 1959 in Cencenighe Agordino, Italy) is an Italian and Argentine physicist and astrophysicist. A professor of Experimental Physics at the University of Padova and Professor Catedratico of Astroparticle Physics at IST Lisboa, he is mostly known for his role in the proposal, construction and data analysis of new telescopes for gamma-ray astrophysics. He is a member of Istituto nazionale di fisica nucleare (INFN), Istituto nazionale di astrofisica (INAF), Italian Physical Society (SIF), International Astronomical Union (IAU), Gruppo2003.

== Career ==
De Angelis graduated in physics from the University of Padova in 1983 studying charmed particles produced in the LExan Bubble Chamber at the European Hybrid Spectrometer. Had a post-doctoral activity at CERN ending as a staff member in Ugo Amaldi's DELPHI experiment. Back to Italy, since 1999 he works mostly to particle astrophysics. He participated to the design and construction of NASA's Fermi Gamma-ray Space Telescope and of the MAGIC Telescopes in the Canary Island of La Palma. He is principal investigator of the space project ASTROGAM and is among the proponents of the Southern Wide-field Gamma-ray Observatory (SWGO), a very-high-energy gamma-rays observatory to be constructed on the Andes. He proposed the mixing between gamma rays and axions in intergalactic magnetic fields.

From 2010 to 2011 he has been guest scientist at the Werner Heisenberg Max Planck Institute for Physics in Munich, and since 2014 has been for three years Director of Research at INFN.

He also works on popularization of science and on history and philosophy of physics, in particular in relation to cosmic rays and to the Galilei period. He is editor for Springer Nature in the area of History of Physics.

== Prizes ==
- Highly Cited Researcher, Thomson-Reuters/Clarivate, 2016
- Thomson-Reuters Award for belonging to the "top 1% researchers publishing in the field of Space Science over the [...] decade" 2001–2010, 2011
- American Astronomical Society's Bruno Rossi Prize with the Fermi LAT Team, 2011
- Highlight of the European Physical Society for the article "Nationalism and internationalism in science: the case of the discovery of cosmic rays", with P. Carlson, Eur. Phys. J. H 36, 309, 2010
- NASA Group Achievement Award, 2008

== Honors ==
ribbon for ordinary uniform

"Commendatore OMRI di iniziativa del Presidente della Repubblica"
— Roma, 19 dicembre 2018

== Books ==
- De Angelis, Alessandro (2024). Galileo e la navigazione satellitare (prefazione di William R. Shea) (in Italian). Roma: Castelvecchi.
- De Angelis, Alessandro (2023). Cosmic Rays (multimessenger astrophysics and revolutionary astronomy). Astronomers' Universe. Heidelberg: Springer Nature. doi:10.1007/978-3-031-38560-5. ISBN 978-3-031-38560-5. De Angelis, Alessandro (2024). L'Universo Nascosto (la nuova astronomia dei raggi cosmici e delle onde gravitazionali) (in Italian). Roma: Castelvecchi.
- De Angelis, Alessandro (2022). Galileo e la supernova del 1604 (con la traduzione del Dialogo de Cecco di Ronchitti da Bruzene) (in Italian). Roma: Castelvecchi. ISBN 978-88-3290-950-0. Archived from the original on 2023-02-02. De Angelis, Alessandro (2024). Galileo and the 1604 supernova (with the translation of the Dialogo de Cecco di Ronchitti da Bruzene). Heidelberg: Springer Nature.
- De Angelis, Alessandro (2021). I diciotto anni migliori della mia vita (Galileo a Padova 1592-1610) (in Italian). Roma: Castelvecchi. ISBN 978-88-3290-346-1. De Angelis, Alessandro (2023). Galileu em Pádua (in Portuguese). Lisboa: Gradiva. ISBN 978-989-785-192-6.
- De Angelis, Alessandro (2021). Discorsi e Dimostrazioni Matematiche di Galileo Galilei per il Lettore Moderno (in Italian). Torino: Codice. ISBN 978-88-7578-930-5. De Angelis, Alessandro (2021). Galileo Galilei's Two New Sciences for Modern Readers. Heidelberg: Springer Nature. ISBN 978-3-030-71952-4. De Angelis, Alessandro (2022). Les deux sciences nouvelles de Galilée: une version moderne (in French). Paris: EDP Science. ISBN 978-2-7598-2667-4. With prefaces by Ugo Amaldi and Telmo Pievani.
- De Angelis, Alessandro; Pimenta, Mario; Conceicao, Ruben (2021). Particle and Astroparticle Physics: Problems and Solutions. Heidelberg: Springer Nature. ISBN 978-3-030-73116-8.
- De Angelis, Alessandro; Pimenta, Mario (2018). Introduction to Particle and Astroparticle Physics: Multimessenger Astronomy and its Particle Physics Foundations. Heidelberg: Springer Nature. ISBN 978-3-319-78180-8. With a preface by Francis Halzen.
- De Angelis, Alessandro; Pimenta, Mario (2015). Introduction to Particle and Astroparticle Physics: Questions to the Universe. Heidelberg: Springer. ISBN 978-3-319-78180-8.
- De Angelis, Alessandro (2012). L'enigma dei raggi cosmici: le piu' grandi energie dell'Universo (in Italian). Milano: Springer. ISBN 978-88-470-2047-4. With a preface by Margherita Hack.
