= Filippo Diversi =

Luccan scholar and writer

Filippo Diversi, in Latin Philippus de Diversis de Quartigianis (fl. 1434–1444), was a Luccan scholar and writer. His life is known mostly from his own writings, the most important of which is his Descriptio of the city of Dubrovnik (Ragusa).

Filippo was born in Lucca in imperial Italy in the 1390s to Giovanni of the Quartigiani family. With the fall of the Republic of Lucca and the rise of Paolo Guinigi, his family was forced into exile. They went to Venice, where there was a large community of expatriate Luccans supported by organs like the Scuola dei Santo Volto. According to an appeal he lodged on 8 December 1444, his grandfather Nicolò and his great-grandfather Giovanni had also suffered exile for the sake of Luccan liberty.

In 1434, Filippo was invited by the Republic of Ragusa to teach grammar. He took up his post in the Sponza Palace, but he did not receive the promised remuneration. In Ragusa he wrote his most famous work, Situs aedificiorum, politiae et laudabilium consuetudinum inclytae civitatis Ragusii ad ipsius Senatum descriptio, a description of the city in fifty chapters dedicated to the senate, which probably commissioned it. He describes the city's geography and climate in Part I, architecture in Part II, church and constitution in Part III and customs in Part IV. He completely ignores the city's history.

Filippo was still in Ragusa in 1440 and thereafter his movements are hard to trace. Although elected on 22 October 1441 to a teaching position in Lucca, he does not seem to have taken it up. He would have taught grammar, rhetoric and moral philosophy for 100 florins. It is uncertain, therefore, if he ever returned to Lucca. He was in Venice when he lodged his appeal ad Lucenses ("to the Luccans") in 1444.

Besides his Descriptio of Ragusa, three speeches by Filippo have survived. Like the Descriptio they are rather flat and far from the tendencies and lexicon of the new humanism:

- Pro funere Serenissimi olim Romanorum Imperatoris semper Augusti ac Regis Illustrissimi Regnorum Unghariae et Bohemiae Sigismundi (eulogy of Sigismund, Holy Roman Emperor, delivered 20 January 1438)
- In laudem Serenissimi Unghariae et Bohemiae Regis electi, et coronati, ac Ducis Austriae inclyti, et Moraniae Marchionis Domini Alberti oratio (congratulations on Duke Albert of Austria's election and coronation as king of Hungary and Bohemia, delivered 26 February 1438)
- Pro morte Illustrissimi Regis Alberti Romanorum et Unghariae et Bohemiae et Ducis Austriae defuncti (eulogy of Albert, who died 27 October 1439)
