= Morykoni family =

Polish noble family

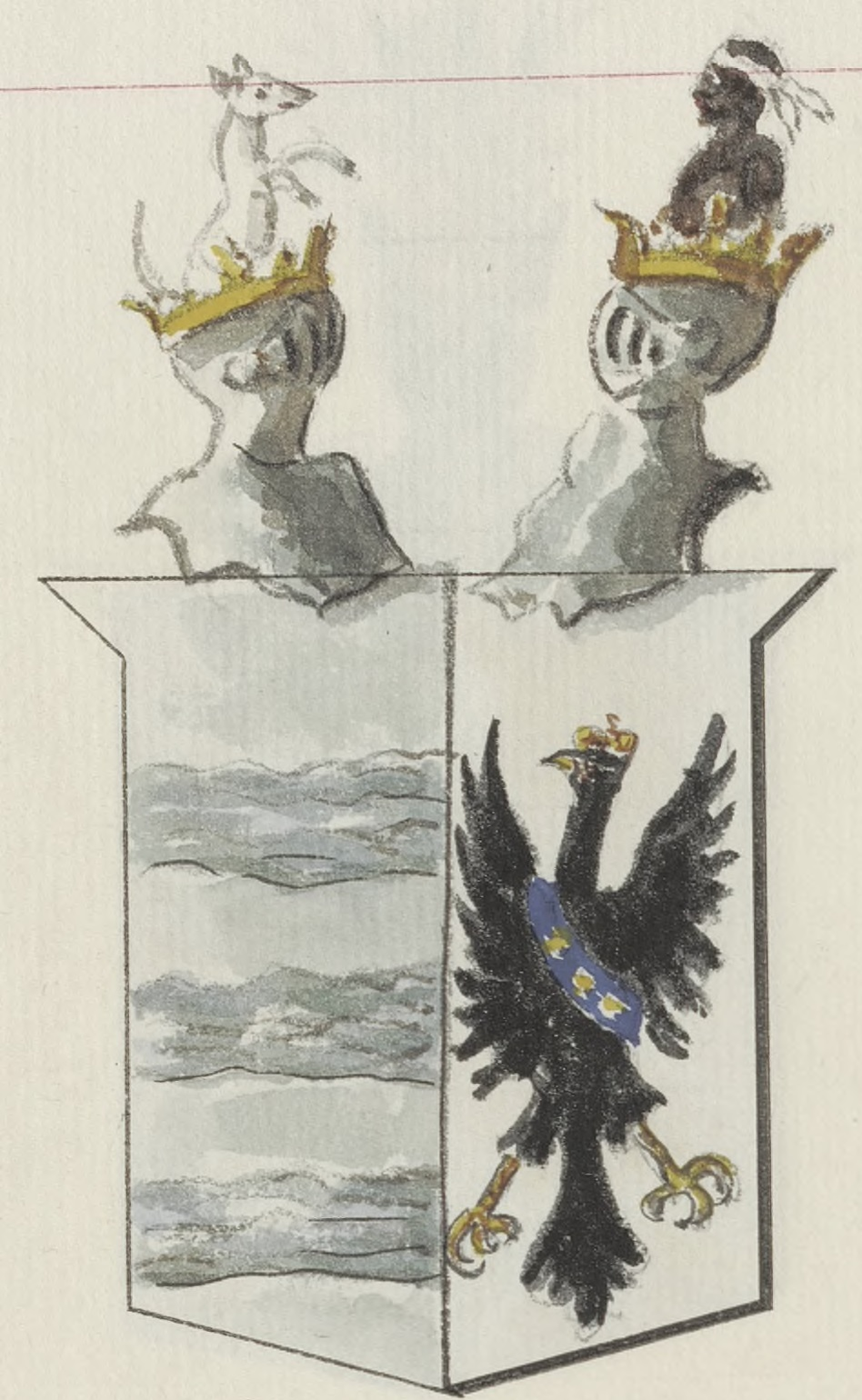
Morykoni coat of arms

The Morykoni family was a Polish-Lithuanian noble family, a branch of the Italian merchant family Moriconi from Lucca. They arrived in the Polish–Lithuanian Commonwealth in the 16th century and settled permanently in the 17th century, obtaining noble status and estates, mainly in the territory of the Grand Duchy of Lithuania.

== History ==
The progenitor of the Italian family was Ropaldo, who lived in the 11th century. His descendants built the family's position as one of the most powerful in the Republic of Lucca, based on silk production and trade, mainly with France. Access to the French market became significantly restricted in the second half of the 16th century. In this situation, the Moriconi sought new markets and turned their attention to the Kingdom of Poland, where the nobility was interested in luxury fabrics. Moreover, after the marriage of Sigismund I the Old to Bona Sforza, the country became particularly open to Italian merchants and newcomers.

The first Moriconi to settle permanently in Poland was Bartolomeo di Giovanni (born 1574), who received Kraków citizenship on May 28, 1616, followed by his son Giovanni on August 2, 1623. Another family member, Frediano di Lorenzo (born 1622), arrived in Poland in 1637 and amassed a vast fortune, becoming a creditor of the Polish king John II Casimir. In 1665, unable to repay a debt of 60,000 thalers, the king granted him noble status and estates in Lithuania.

Without direct heirs, Frediano summoned his nephews, Scipione (born 1642) and Giovanni Carlo (born 1647), to settle on his estates and become his successors. Both of them were also granted noble status in 1673. They also received the estates of Świadoście and Soły. They quickly assimilated into Polish society, and their surname was Polonized to Morykoni, although they maintained in the first generations ties with Lucca. The family quickly established itself as wealthy landowners, forming close ties with the powerful Radziwiłł family. The Morykoń family also used their own coat of arms, which featured, on the left side, waves on a silver background taken from the family crest used in Lucca. On the right side, however, there was a black eagle.

Of the two, only Scipione had children. Here are some of his notable descendants:

- Krzysztof Morykoni (born c. 1690), who owned the estates of Salos, Taujėnai, and Lyduokiai in the Ukmergė County.
  - Marcjan Franciszek Morykoni (born c. 1710, died 1784), colonel, starosta of Ukmergė
    - Benedykt Beniamin Morykoni (1740-1813), Lithuanian Grand Scribe, one of the leaders of Kościuszko Uprising
    - Ignacy Morykoni (died after 1822), starosta of Ukmergė
    - Hieronim Morykni (died 1832)
      - Lucjan Morykoni (1818-1893), participant of the January Uprising, scientist
  - Michał Tadeusz Morykoni (1720-1788), podkomorzy of Ukmergė
    - Józef Tadeusz Morykoni, general of the Grand Ducal Lithuanian Army, adjutant of Tadeusz Kościuszko
- Aleksander Morykoni (1683–1751), a Jesuit, teacher, and professor of theology and rhetoric

A member of the family was also Kajetan Morykoni (1774–1830), the rector of the Voivodeship School in Płock.

== Bibliography ==
- Tygielski, Wojciech (2015). Italians in Early Modern Poland. The Lost Opportunity for Modernization?.
