= James Primadicci =

James Primadicci (early 15th century, Bologna, Signoria of Bologna (Italy) – 1460, Bologna) was a Papal diplomat who was particularly charged with sensitive attempts to bring Eastern churches back into communion with Rome.
