= Ugo Amaldi =

Ugo Amaldi may refer to:

- Ugo Amaldi (mathematician) (1875–1957), Italian mathematician
- Ugo Amaldi (physicist) (born 1934), Italian physicist, grandson of the above
