= Simone (surname) =

Simone is an Italian surname. The surname was first recorded in the year 1346, and is believed to be the Italian equivalent of Simon.

== Origins and etymology ==
The name Simone ultimately originates as a variant of Shimeon which is Hebrew for "one who harkens".

== Variants and similar surnames ==
Popular variants of this surname include Simonetti, Simoni, Simioni, Desimone among several others.

== Popularity of name ==
According to United States Census data taken in the year 2000, there were approximately 7,040 people in the United States with this surname. Thus ranking Simone as the 4,607th in terms of most popular surnames.

== Notable people with the surname Simone ==
Some of the most notable people with the surname Simone include:

- Afric Simone (born 1939), a Mozambique singer and musician
- Albert J. Simone (born 1935), a former president of the Rochester Institute of Technology, Rochester, New York
- Andrew Simone (born 1938), a Canadian dermatologist
- Domonique Simone (born 1971), an American adult actress
- Eduardo Simone (born 1974), an Argentine rugby union player
- Franco Simone (born 1949), an Italian singer and songwriter, composer and television host
- Gail Simone (born 1974), an American comic book writer
- Hannah Simone (born 1980), a Canadian actress and television host
- Kirsten Simone (1934–2024), a Danish ballerina
- Marco Simone (born 1969), a former Italian football player
- Mercedes Simone (1904–1990), an Argentine singer and actress
- Nina Simone (1933–2003), an American singer and songwriter
- Simuna (or Simona), a Jewish Talmudist Savora sage
