= Alessandro De Angelis (Jesuit) =

Italian Jesuit philosopher (1559–1620)

Alessandro De Angelis S.J.
- Born: 1559; Spoleto, Papal States
- Died: 10 September 1620 (aged 60–61); Ferrara, Papal States
- Education: Collegio Romano
- Known for: In astrologos coniectores libri quinque (1615)
- Scientific career
- Fields: Astronomer, Theologist

Alessandro De Angelis joined the Society of Jesus in 1581, at the age of 22. He devoted himself to teaching at the Collegio Romano, reaching the highest level of the academic body between 1612 and 1617, in the period of the first dispute between Galileo Galilei and the Roman Church.

He taught, as customary at that time, various disciplines from humanities to theology and scientific disciplines ranging from logic to physics.

His only known work and for which he is remembered is In astrologos contiectores (Against astrological conjectures), published for the first time in Lyon and then also in Rome in 1615, containing astronomical, theological and historical arguments against astrologers and their conjectures. The book attacks in particular the theses of Gerolamo Cardano, and strongly supports free will. The work had several other re-editions in European cities including Antwerp. In this work De Angelis examines possible astral influences regarding the gestation and birth of a human being, denying any possible influence.

== Works ==
- De Angelis, Alessandro (1615). In astrologos coniectores libri quinque (in Latin). Roma: Bartolomeo Zannetti.

== Bibliography ==
- Moneta, Milena (1987). "Alessandro De Angelis". Dizionario Biografico degli Italiani (in Italian). Vol. 33: D'Asaro–De Foresta. Rome: Istituto dell'Enciclopedia Italiana. ISBN 978-88-12-00032-6.
- Jacobilli, L. (1658). Bibliotheca Umbriae sive de scriptoribus Provinciae Umbriae. Fulginae. p. 36.
- Villoslada, R. G. (1954). Storia del Collegio Romano. Roma. pp. 219, 323 s., 327, 329, 332.
- Sommervogel, C. Bibliothèque de la Compagnie de Jésus, I, p. 387; VIII, p. 1653
