= House of Burlamacchi =

Overview of the Burlamacchi family, an influential Italian family from Lucca

The House of Burlamacchi, with origins traceable to the early 13th century, derives its name from Buglione Burlamacchi. Throughout the medieval period, the family established prominence in the Republic of Lucca, a significant city-state in pre-unification Italy known for its political and commercial influence. As adherents of the Guelph faction, the Burlamacchi supported papal authority in opposition to the Ghibelline faction, which aligned with the Holy Roman Emperor.

During the 13th and 14th centuries, the Burlamacchi emerged as one of Lucca's most influential families, achieving distinction in the silk trade and holding prominent roles in the city's governance. Their primary residence, a substantial domus magna (great house) located in the parish of S. Alessandro Maggiore, was documented as early as the 14th century.

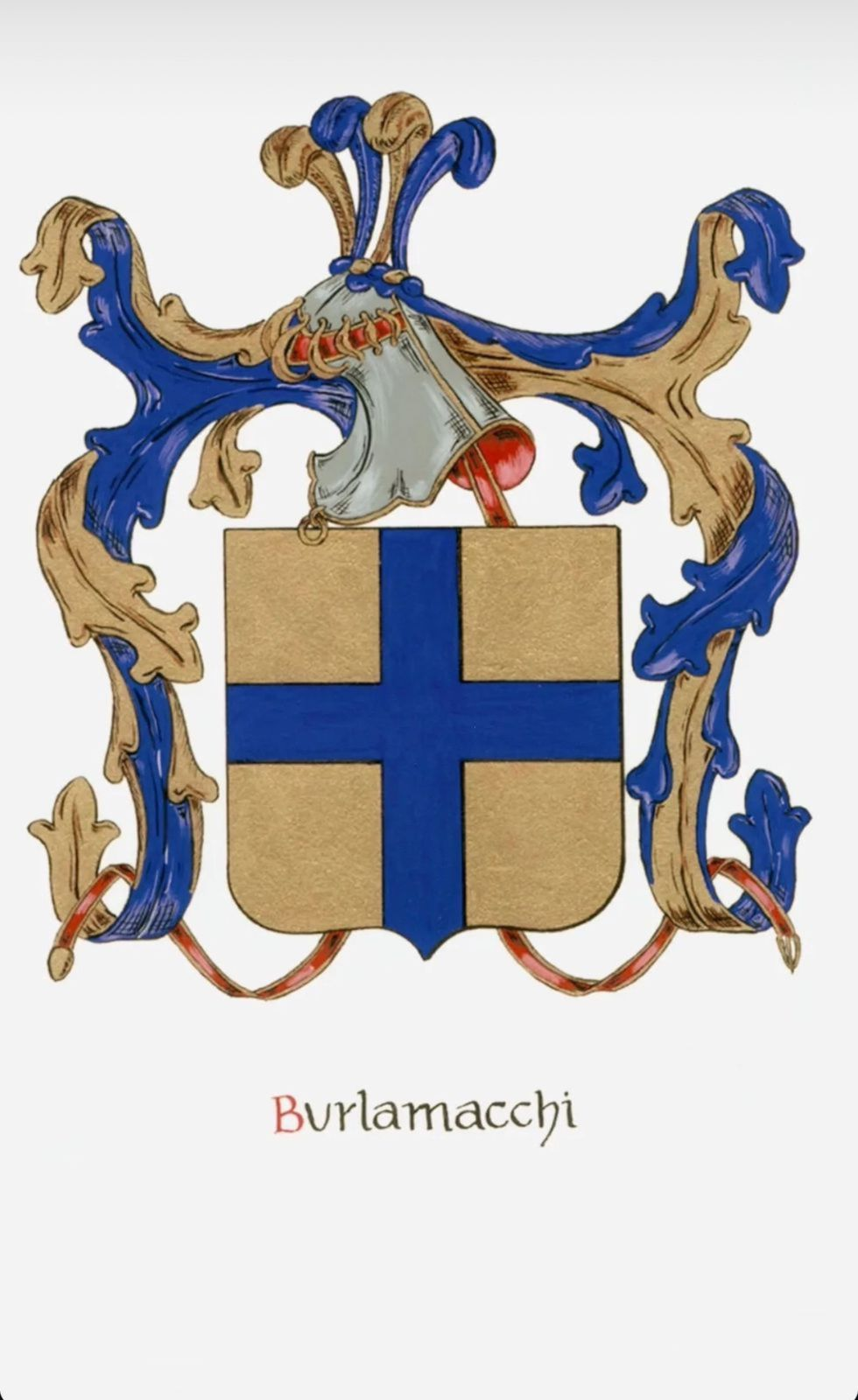
Coat of arms of the Burlamacchi family

== Francesco Burlamacchi ==
In the 16th century, Francesco Burlamacchi, a political leader and Gonfaloniere of the Republic of Lucca, played a pivotal role in the region's history. In 1549, he spearheaded an initiative to liberate Pisa from Florentine control, specifically targeting the dominance of the Medici family. Francesco envisioned a confederation of Italian states that would promote peace, unity, and independence from foreign powers, including Florence.

This ambitious plan, however, faced significant opposition. Cosimo I de' Medici, the ruler of Florence, and certain citizens of Lucca—wary of potential Florentine reprisals and the implications of a unified Italian state—rejected Francesco's proposal. Betrayed by his fellow citizens, Francesco was delivered to the tribunals of Emperor Charles V, one of the era's most powerful monarchs. Following his capture, he was tortured and beheaded in 1549, serving as a warning to those challenging Florentine and imperial authority.

Despite the failure of his movement, Francesco Burlamacchi's legacy endured. Four centuries later, he was recognized as the "first martyr" of Italian unification. In tribute to his contributions, the city of Lucca erected a marble monument in his honor in Piazza San Michele. Francesco remains a symbol of the struggle for liberty and the Unification of Italy.

== Migration ==
=== Brazil and Portugal ===
In the 18th century, Ippolito Burlamacchi and his brother Carlo relocated to Portugal to advance the family's commercial and political interests. Ippolito married Matilde Valentina Pedegache Brandão, a Portuguese noblewoman, and their union produced a son, Carlos César Burlamaqui. This marriage integrated Italian and Portuguese nobility, giving rise to the Brazilian branch of the Burlamaqui family, from which all Brazilian descendants originate.

The Burlamaqui family settled in the Brazilian state of Piauí, where they continued their tradition of political engagement, securing prominent offices during the 19th century. Carlos César Burlamaqui distinguished himself as a knight of the Order of Christ, a colonel, the governor of Piauí, and the inaugural governor of Sergipe. His nephew, Polidoro César Burlamaqui, furthered the family's legacy as a professor, jurist, and politician, serving as governor of both Piauí and Paraná and holding the titles of officer of the Order of the Rose and the Order of Christ.

=== France ===
Salvatore Burlamacchi, born in Lucca on November 9, 1602, pursued a career as a banker in Lucca, Amsterdam, and Lyon. He married Marguerite de Lumagne, daughter of banker Jean André Lumague and sister of Marie Lumague. In 1633, Salvatore received letters of naturalization in France. His son, François Burlamacchi, served as a page to Louis XIV and, in 1673, married Marie Picot, daughter of Jacques, Lord of Vivier and Motte de Coutevroult and steward to the French king.

A descendant, Jean François Burlamacchi, a captain in the Dauphin regiment, died in June 1734 during the Battle of Parma. His wife, Claude Gatian, was the daughter of a counselor and master of requests of the Parliament of Paris. Jean François’ sister, Catherine Isidore de Bourlamaque, served as abbess of the Pont-aux-Dames abbey from 1727 until her death in 1752.

From the union of Jean François and Claude Gatian was born François Charles de Bourlamaque, a distinguished 18th-century French general. His military career saw him rise from military engineer to brigadier general and major general. He was also honored as a commander of the Royal and Military Order of Saint Louis and served as governor of Guadeloupe.

== Notable figures ==
The Burlamacchi family and its branches, Burlamaqui and Bourlamaque, include several distinguished members:

- Eufrasia Burlamacchi – Italian miniaturist.
- Francesco Burlamacchi – Politician and patrician, recognized as the "first martyr" of Italian unification.
- Michele Burlamacchi – Italian merchant.
- Renea Burlamacchi – Italian writer.
- Philippe Burlamacchi – Financial intermediary for King Charles I of England.
- Jean-Jacques Burlamaqui – Jurist and writer whose works influenced the philosophy of law across Europe.
- François Charles de Bourlamaque – French general, governor of Guadeloupe, and commander of the Royal and Military Order of Saint Louis.
- Carlos César Burlamaqui – Brazilian politician, president of Piauí and Sergipe, knight of the Order of Christ.
- Polidoro César Burlamaqui – Brazilian jurist, professor and politician, president of Piauí and Paraná.
