= Signoria =

Medieval Italian governing body

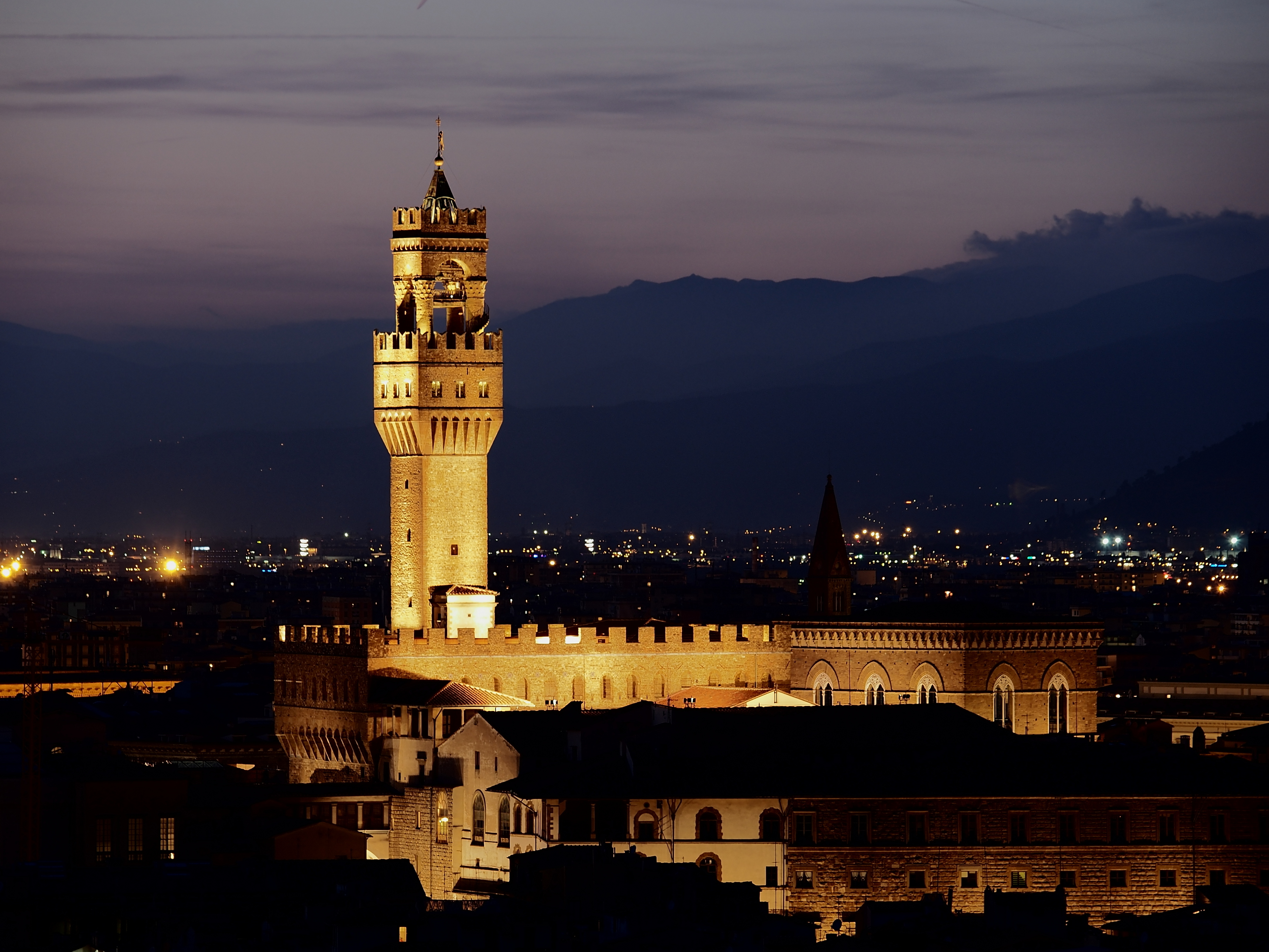
Palazzo Vecchio, the former seat of the Signoria of Florence

A signoria (Italian: [siɲɲoˈriːa]) was the governing authority in many of the Italian city-states during the Medieval and Renaissance periods. The word signoria comes from signore (Italian: [siɲˈɲoːre]), or "lord", an abstract noun meaning (roughly) "government", "governing authority", de facto "sovereignty", "lordship"; pl.: signorie.

== History of the Signoria ==
During the late 13th and early 14th centuries, a significant shift occurred in the governance of Italian cities. Whereas citizens had once chosen their own leaders, they began to entrust power to a single ruler. Such authority often spiraled out of control when the citizens could not depose rulers who had failed to govern wisely.

These figures were frequently labeled tyrants or despots. As the attempts of Frederick II to restore imperial control collapsed, forms of monarchy re-emerged on a local scale. Power first gathered around Frederick’s former political and military deputies, and later around prominent factional leaders. Though their authority was often unofficial as they ruled as masters rather than legally recognized lords, they succeeded in transmitting control to their descendants. In some cases, this dominance was later regularized through popular “elections” or formal grants of extraordinary powers, as occurred in Ferrara in 1264 and Mantua in 1299. Over time, several of these signorial regimes evolved into the principalities and regional powers that shaped Renaissance Italy, including the houses of Visconti, Este, Gonzaga, and Montefeltro. By the year 1300, signorial governments prevailed across most of northern Italy; the few cities that still retained communal autonomy (such as Padua, Parma, and Vicenza) soon came under similar kinds of rule.

In The Divine Comedy, Dante frequently depicted Italy as a land ruled by despots and condemned the rise of lordship, associating it with humanity’s most destructive impulses such as pride, which drove some individuals to assert dominance over their fellow citizens. Others defended the emergence of these rulers, believing that only a strong leader could end the internal strife that had long plagued their cities and restore stability.

Contemporary observers and modern historians see the rise of the signoria as a reaction to the failure of the comuni to maintain law-and-order and suppress party strife and civil discord. In the anarchic conditions that often prevailed in medieval Italian city-states, people looked to strong men to restore order and disarm the feuding elites.

Henry Hallam would remark that "I know not of any English word that characterises them, except tyrant in its primitive sense."

== Politics ==
By the beginning of the 14th century, a number of cities in northern Italy were ruled by signori: Milan by the Visconti family, Ferrara by the Este, Verona by the Della Scala, Padua by the Carrara. The earliest signori in Tuscany were the condottieri (mercenaries) Uguccione della Faggiuola at Pisa and Lucca (1313–16), and Castruccio Castracani, also at Lucca (1320–28).

Initially, some cities dismantled lordships once conflicts subsided. However, when a ruler maintained power across multiple wars, the likelihood of their continued rule increased. The hereditary transmission of power, as seen in 1264 when Azzo d'Este passed his position to his nephew Obizzo, contributed to the normalization of one-man rule. This precedent encouraged similar developments in other cities, solidifying the institutionalization of lordship in northern and central Italy.

In areas that were not under the rule of a prince, the name Signoria often refers to the ruling body of magistrates. In Florence, those who made up the signoria were often members of the most distinguished families.

== List of signorie ==
City	Family	Period	Allegiance	Notes
Monaco	Grimaldi	1287–1612	Guelph	Gained independence from Genoa in 1287. Titled Princes of Monaco since 1612.
Milan	Della Torre	1259–1277	Guelph	Deposed by Ghibelline party, led by Visconti.
Milan	Visconti	1277–1302	Ghibelline	Took over Milan after Battle of Desio in 1277. Deposed by Della Torre in 1302.
Milan	Della Torre	1302–1311	Guelph	Deposed and exiled by Emperor Henry VII.
Milan	Visconti	1311–1395	Ghibelline	Re-enthroned by Henry VII in 1311. Titled Dukes of Milan from 1395.
Mantua	Bonacolsi	1272–1328	Variable	Overthrown in a revolt backed by Gonzaga in 1328.
Mantua	Gonzaga	1328–1433	Ghibelline	Titled Margraves of Mantua from 1433.
Verona	Della Scala	1282–1387	Ghibelline	Overthrown by a Visconti-backed revolt in 1387.
Treviso	Da Camino	1283–1312	Guelph	Overthrown in a conspiracy in 1312.
Padua	Da Carrara	1318–1405	Guelph	Overthrown by the Republic of Venice in 1405.
Ferrara	Este	1209–1471	Guelph	Titled Dukes of Ferrara from 1471.
Modena	Este	1336–1471	Guelph	Titled Dukes of Modena and Reggio from 1471.
Modena	Pio	1336–1599	Unclear	Titled Lords of Carpi (1336-1527) and Sassuolo (1499-1599)
Bologna	Pepoli	1337–1350	Guelph	Overthrown by Visconti army in 1350.
Bologna	Bentivoglio	1401–1506	Ghibelline	Overthrown by Pope Julius II in 1506.
Ravenna	Da Polenta	1275–1441	Guelph	Overthrown and exiled by the Republic of Venice in 1441.
Forlì	Ordelaffi	1295–1359 (Interregnum); 1376–1480	Ghibelline	Declined due to conflicts inside city. Peacefully deposed in 1480.
Forlì	Riario	1480–1499	Guelph	De facto a satellite of Milan from 1488, under regent Caterina Sforza. Overthrown by Cesare Borgia in 1499.
Forlì	Borgia	1499–1503	Guelph	Ruled over all Romagna, with Cesare as Duke of Romagna.
Forlì	Ordelaffi	1503–1504	Ghibelline	Line extinct in 1504.
Pesaro	Malatesta	1285–1445	Guelph	Overthrown in a coup led by the Sforza in 1445.
Rimini	Malatesta	1295–1500	Guelph	Overthrown by Cesare Borgia in 1500.
Cesena	Malatesta	1378–1465	Guelph	Line extinct in 1465.
Urbino	Da Montefeltro	1213–1234	Ghibelline	Titled Counts of Urbino (the Dukes) from 1234.
Lucca	Quartigiani	1308–1316	Guelph	Overthrown in a coup led by the Antelminelli in 1316.
Lucca	Antelminelli	1316–1328	Ghibelline	Overthrown by Guelph party in 1328.
Lucca	Guinigi	1400–1430	Guelph	Deposed by the restoration of the Republic in 1430.
Florence	Medici	1434–1494 (Interregnum); 1512–1527 (Interregnum); 1530–1532	Guelph	Titled Dukes of Florence from 1532.
Pisa	Della Gherardesca	1316–1347	Ghibelline	Deposed and replaced by the Gambacorta family in 1347.
Pisa	Gambacorta	1347–1392	Guelph	Overthrown by a conspiracy in 1392.
Pisa	Appiano	1392–1399	Ghibelline	Overthrown by the Visconti in 1399.
Pisa	Visconti	1399–1406	Ghibelline	Overthrown by the Republic of Florence in 1406.
Siena	Petrucci	1487–1525	Ghibelline	Peacefully deposed by republican institutions in 1525.

== See also ==
- Seignory
- Signoria of Florence
- Signoria of Venice
- Forni della Signoria
