= Quartigiani =

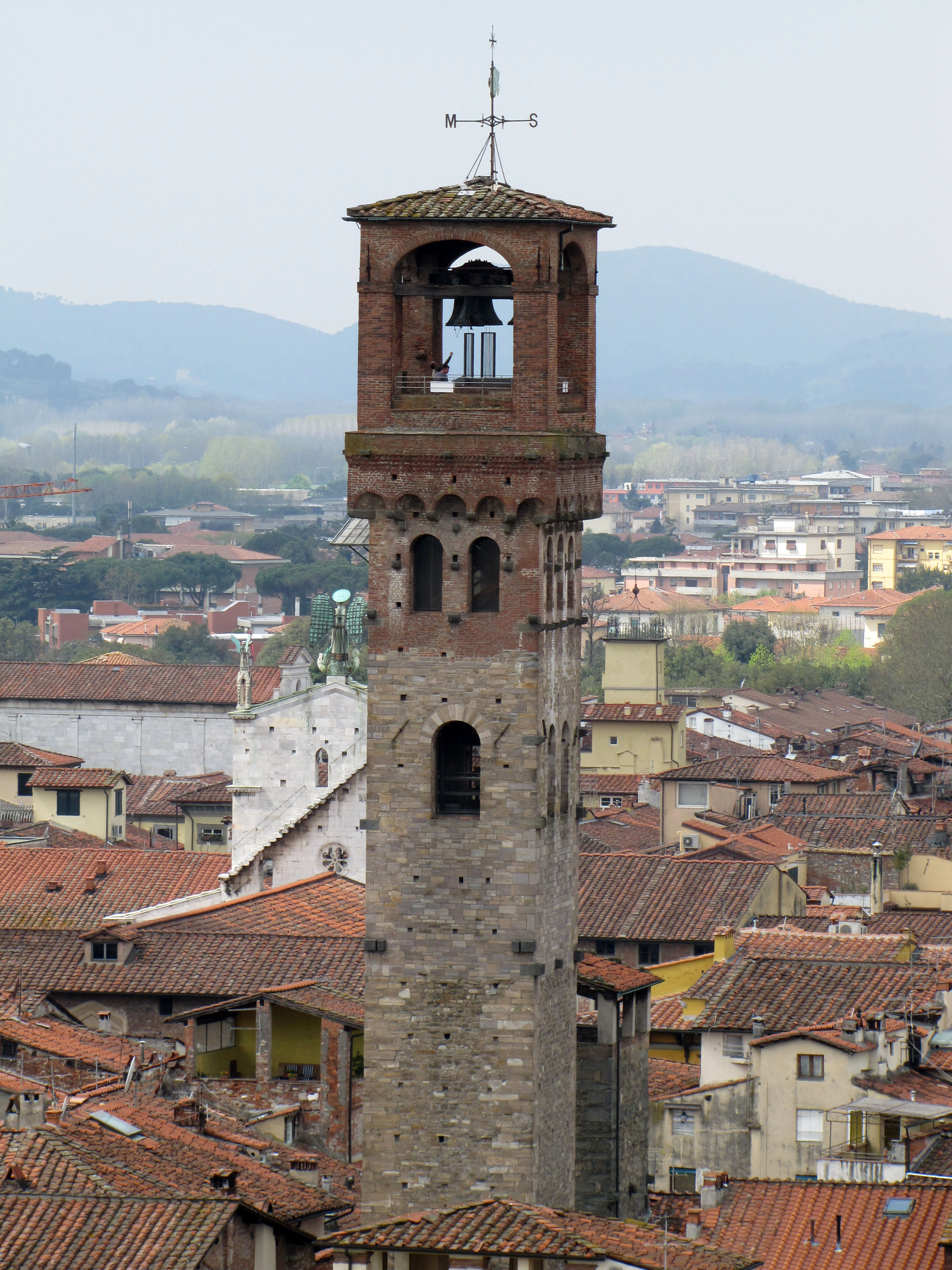
Torre delle Ore, Lucca, belonged to Quartigiani family

The Quartigiani family was an old Italian noble family from Lucca.

== History ==
The family was first mentioned as a noble one, in the Lucca statute of 1308. The family was united by means of marriage with the Simonetti and Antelminelli families. The Antelminelli and Quartigiani families united in 1317 in order to take power in Lucca. Castruccio Castracani, a member of the Antelminelli, did not share power with the Quartigiani as promised and agreed by the parties. The Quartigiani organized a plot to take power from Castruccio Castracani and assassinate him. The White Guelfs, the Florentines and the nobility from Lucca were involved in the plot. After finding out about the plot Castracani arrested and killed members of the Quartigiani and related clans and organized a military response against Florence.

== Members ==
- Filippo Diversi
