= Simonini (surname) =

Simonini is an Italian surname. Notable people with the surname include:

- Alberto Simonini (1896–1960), Italian politician
- Ed Simonini (1954–2019), American football player
- Francesco Simonini (1686–after 1753), Italian painter
- Peter Simonini (born 1957), American soccer player
