= House of Antelminelli =

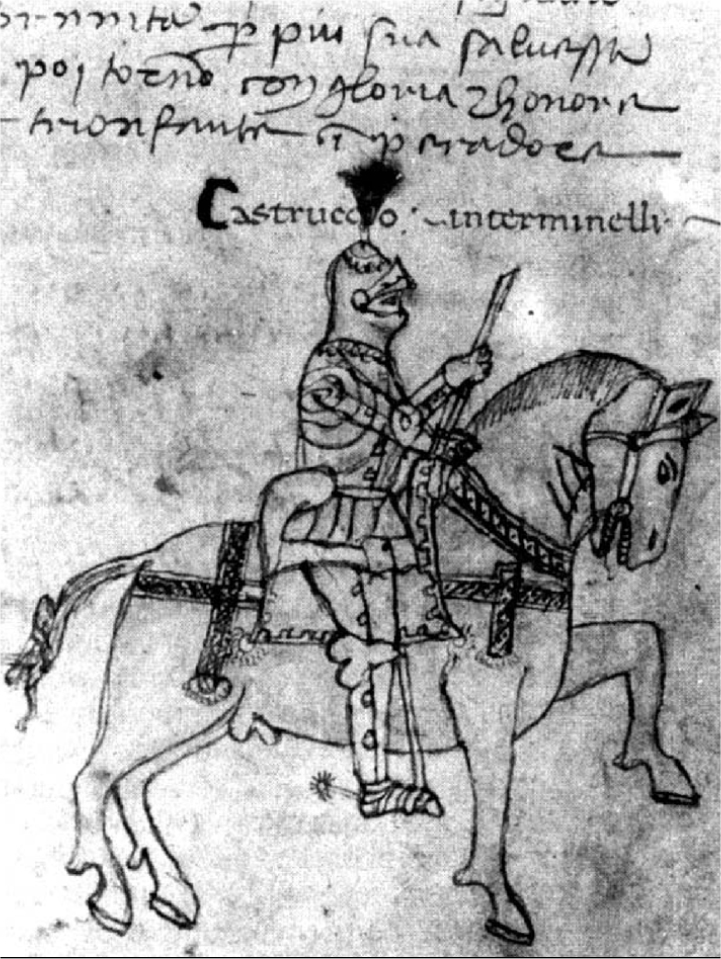
Castruccio Antelminelli, Duke of Lucca, (Biblioteca Statale di Lucca, Ms. 1661, f.82r)

The House of Antelminelli was a noble family from Lucca. The family was involved in the struggle between the Guelph and the Ghibellini parties in Tuscany. The leader of the family in the early 14th century was Castruccio Castracani a famous Ghibelline leader. Serving under the Ghibelline chief, Uguccione della Faggiuola, he was elected lord (as lifelong consul) of Lucca on 12 June 1316, displacing the Quartigiani family, and was appointed Duke of Lucca, Pistoia, Volterra and Luni by emperor Frederick of Austria. In the following generation the power of the family collapsed in the general success of the Guelfs. In 1596, the family was charged with high treason for allegedly conspiring with the Grand Duchy of Tuscany against the Republic of Lucca. Most of the Antelminellis were imprisoned or executed, save for Alessandro Antelminelli who fled to London and eventually became the Tuscan ambassador there under the alias "Amerigo Salvetti".
