= E-ASTROGAM =

ASTROGAM
- The payload of e-ASTROGAM (gamma-ray telescope)
- Mission type: Astronomy

The ASTROGAM concept consists in the use of a silicon tracker to record the Compton interactions and the pair production by gamma rays in the MeV-GeV region. The energy of the final state particles can possibly measured by a calorimeter.

e-ASTROGAM is a proposed space mission with the purpose of measuring gamma-rays from astrophysical sources in the energy range from 300 keV to a few GeV. e-ASTROGAM reaches a sensitivity one-two orders of magnitude larger than its predecessor, the detector COMPTEL on the Compton Gamma Ray Observatory (CGRO), and offers as a new feature the capability of fast triggers for astrophysical transients.

The mission will provide unique data of significant interest to a broad astronomical community, complementary to powerful observatories such as LIGO-Virgo-GEO600-KAGRA, SKA, ALMA, E-ELT, TMT, LSST, JWST, Athena, CTA, IceCube, KM3N, LISA. It will sample the right energies to explore the highest-energy electromagnetic counterparts of gravitational wave events, localizing possible corresponding gamma-ray bursts.

Multiwavelength and Multimessenger Science with e-ASTROGAM

e-ASTROGAM is made of 56 Silicon planes, about 1 m^2 each, which record Compton interactions and pair production events induced by cosmic photons, by an anticoincidence detector and by a calorimeter.

The international collaboration working to e-ASTROGAM involves more than 400 scientists working in institutions from Argentina, Brazil, Bulgaria, China, Croatia, Czech Republic, Denmark, Ireland, Italy, Finland, France, Germany, Japan, Mexico, Norway, Poland, Portugal, Russia, Spain, Sweden, Switzerland, United States.

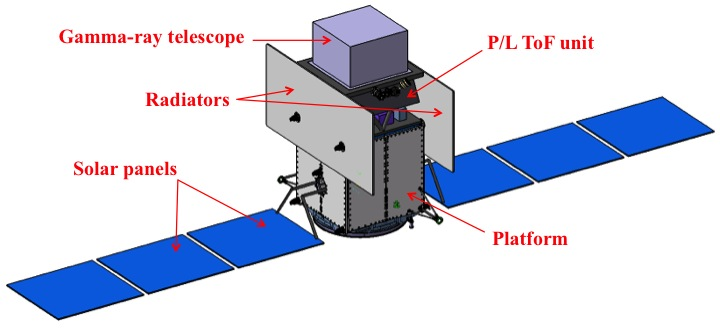
The e-ASTROGAM satellite deployed

Scheme for science topics and properties of the mission.
