= Southern Wide-field Gamma-ray Observatory =

Gamma-ray observatory in Chile

The Southern Wide-field Gamma-ray Observatory (SWGO) is an upcoming gamma-ray observatory planned for construction at the Atacama Astronomical Park in northern Chile. It is designed to detect air shower particles produced by gamma rays as they interact with the Earth's atmosphere. Construction of the observatory is scheduled to begin in 2026.

The SWGO Collaboration comprises more than 100 scientists from various countries, including Argentina, Brazil, Bolivia, Chile, the Czech Republic, Italy, Germany, Mexico, Peru, Portugal, South Korea, the United Kingdom, and the United States.

As the first high-altitude gamma-ray observatory providing wide-field coverage of a significant portion of the southern sky, SWGO is expected to complement existing and future instruments such as the High-Altitude Water Cherenkov (HAWC) observatory, the Large High Altitude Air Shower Observatory (LHAASO), and the Cherenkov Telescope Array (CTA).

The SWGO will contribute to the global multi-messenger astronomy effort aimed at studying extreme astrophysical phenomena. Its primary scientific goals include investigating both galactic and extragalactic cosmic accelerators, such as supernova remnants, active galactic nuclei, and gamma-ray bursts; testing theories in particle physics beyond the Standard Model; monitoring and analyzing gamma-ray bursts and active galactic nuclei flares; and characterizing the cosmic ray particle flux.
