= Prince Annibale Simonetti =

Nineteenth century Roman nobleman

Prince Annibale Simonetti was a Roman nobleman from nineteenth-century Italy. He was born in Ancona and was related to the Osimo-Jesi branch of the Simonetti. He was assistant to Pope Pius IX, member of parliament and member of the high council of Rome. As a young man in 1848 he was appointed Minister of Finance of Pope Pius IX.
