= Ludovico Jacobilli =

- Born: 13 June 1598; Rome, Papal States
- Died: 13 March 1664 (aged 65); Foligno, Papal States
- Alma mater: Pontifical Gregorian University; University of Perugia
- Occupation: Historian, presbyter

Ludovico Jacobilli ("Ludovicus Jacobillus" in Latin) was an Italian hagiographer and historian, a priest at Foligno. Jacobilli was born in Rome in 1598 into an illustrious family of Foligno and died in 1664. His work was mainly concerned with the saints and cities of Umbria.

In 1662 he donated over 5,000 books from his personal library to the Roman Catholic Diocese of Foligno to enhance the seminary library there. When he died, more than 3,500 books were added to that number. Today the library still bears his name.

== Works ==
- Jacobilli, Ludovico (1628). Vite de' santi, e beati di Foligno. Foligno: appresso Agostino Alterij.
- Jacobilli, Ludovico (1646). Discorso della città di Foligno, cronologia de' vescovi, governatori e podestà. Foligno: Forni.
- Jacobilli, Ludovico (1647). Vite de' Santi et beati dell'Umbria. Vol. 1. Foligno: appresso Agostino Alterij.
- Jacobilli, Ludovico (1656). Vite de' Santi et beati dell'Umbria. Vol. 2. Foligno: appresso Agostino Alterij.
- Jacobilli, Ludovico (1661). Vite de' Santi et beati dell'Umbria. Vol. 3. Foligno: appresso Agostino Alterij.
- Jacobilli, Ludovico (1658). Bibliotheca Umbriae, seu De scriptoribus provinciae Umbriae (in Latin). Foligno: apud Augustinum Alterium.
