= Ugo Amaldi (physicist) =

Italian physicist (born 1934)

Ugo Amaldi; born 26 August 1934, is an Italian physicist, mainly working in the fields of particle and medical physics.

== Biography ==
Amaldi studied at the University of Rome where he graduated in physics in 1957.

He started his career as a researcher at the Italian National Institute of Health (ISS), where he later became research director. Shortly after he took up the appointment, Amaldi led an ISS group of physicists carrying out nuclear physics experiments at the laboratory CERN in Geneva.

As of 1973 he became CERN staff member. From 1980 to 1993 he served as spokesman for the DELPHI Collaboration, which operated an experiment at the Large Electron-Positron Collider (LEP). Amaldi retired officially from CERN in 1999, when he reached the fixed retirement age of 65.

Between 1990 and 2006 Amaldi was physics professor at the universities in Florence and Milan.

Amaldi is founder and president of the TERA foundation—registered in Italy—since its creation in 1992. The foundation works within the field of tumour therapy with hadronic radiations. The foundation has played a central role in the design of the Italian National Centre for Oncological Hadrontherapy (CNAO). In 2016 the foundation engaged in a proposal to construct a facility for charged particle cancer therapy for the South Eastern European countries.

== Research and publications ==
In the early 1970s, Amaldi co-discovered the proton-proton rising cross-section through experiments carried out at the CERN accelerator Intersecting Storage Rings. In 1975 he founded with K. Winter the CHARM Collaboration, which performed many fundamental experiments on neutrino scattering. In 1991, using the first LEP data he gave a widely recognized contribution to the understanding of the unification of the electroweak and strong forces.

Amaldi co-authored in 1984, with his father and mother, an updated version of a well known physics textbook in three volumes for Italian high schools. The first edition, Corso di fisica by his parents only, was published in 1952 and was a rework of the original book authored by Enrico Fermi. After all these years, the book has continued to be published in new editions for years, in 2020 under the title Il nuovo Amaldi.

== Awards and honors ==
Commander (Commendatore Ordine) of the Order of Merit of the Italian Republic (2008).

Amaldi holds honorary doctorates from University of Uppsala (1993), University of Lyon (1997), University of Valencia (1999) and University of Helsinki (2000). He is a Fellow of the European Physical Society, a Distinguished Affiliated Professor at Technical University of Munich, member of the Accademia dei Lincei, and was awarded the inaugural Bruno Pontecorvo Prize by JINR.

== Personal life ==
Amaldi resides in Cologny in the canton of Geneva. He is the son of the first CERN secretary general Edoardo Amaldi and physicist Ginestra Giovene Amaldi, and the grandson of mathematician Ugo Amaldi.
