= Republic of Lucca =

Central Italian state, 1160 to 1805

Coordinates: 43°51′N 10°31′E

Most Serene Republic of Lucca Serenissima Repubblica Lucense (Italian) Res Publica Lucensis (Latin)
- 1160–1805
- Flag Coat of arms
- Motto: Luca potens sternit sibi quae contraria cernit (Latin for 'Luca is powerful and spreads to himself what he sees as the opposite')
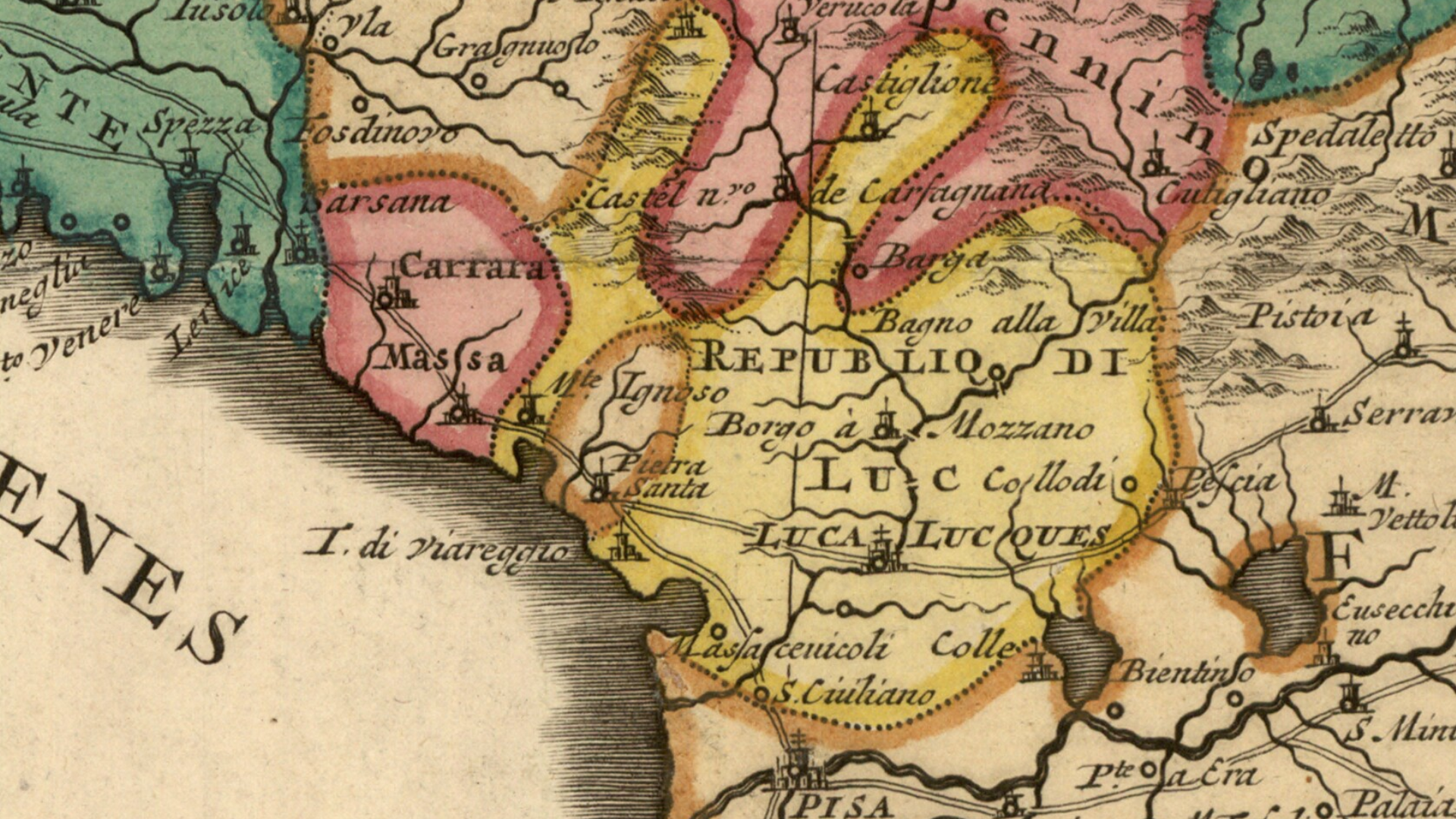
- Detail of a French map of Italy from c. 1700–1750 showing the territory of the Republic of Lucca. The map was designed by Nicolas Sanson (1600–1667) and published after his death by Covens & Mortier.
- Capital: Lucca
- Common languages: Italian; Latin
- Religion: Roman Catholicism
- Government: Oligarchic republic
- Governanti di Lucca
  - 1251–1313: Capitani del popolo
  - 1316–1328: Castruccio Castracani
  - 1387: Gherardo Burlamacchi
  - 1400–1430: Paolo Guinigi
  - 1431, 1435, 1439,1446: Niccolò di Gherardo Burlamacchi
  - 1436, 1440, 1444,1448: Michele di Gherardo Burlamacchi
  - 1533, 1546: Francesco Burlamacchi
- Historical era: Middle Ages; Early modern period
  - Established: 1160
  - Paolo Guinigi overthrows the republican government starting a Signoria: 1400–1430
  - Republican government restored: 1430
  - Disestablished: 23 June 1805

Population
  - 1846 estimate: 155,000
- Currency: Autonomous mint (known as ducato)
Preceded by	Succeeded by
March of Tuscany	Principality of Lucca and Piombino
- Today part of: Italy

The Republic of Lucca (Italian: Repubblica di Lucca) was a medieval and early modern state that was centered on the Italian city of Lucca in Tuscany, which lasted from 1160 to 1805.

Its territory extended beyond the city of Lucca, reaching the surrounding countryside in the north-western part of today's Tuscany region, to the borders with Emilia-Romagna and Liguria.

The Republic of Lucca remained independent until 1799. Later the state continued to exist but was, de facto, dependent upon Napoleonic France, and ceased officially its existence in 1805, when it was transformed into the Principality of Lucca and Piombino.

== Background ==
Within the Imperial Kingdom of Italy, the city of Lucca had been the residence of the Margraves of Tuscany until the time of Margrave Hugh. A certain autonomy was granted by a 1084 diploma issued by Emperor Henry IV, while on his Italian campaign during the Investiture controversy with Pope Gregory VII. No feudal castle could be built in the range of 6 miles from the city wall. More privileges were granted by the following emperors.

== Rise of the Republic ==
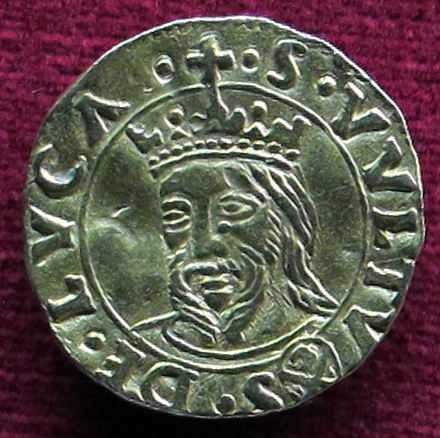
Gold coin of the Republic (1475)

After the death of Margravine Matilda of Tuscany in 1115, the City of Florence began to constitute itself an independent commune, with an administration officially acknowledged by Margrave Conrad in 1120 and by Emperor Frederick in 1162. The city bought the feudal rights from Margrave Welf VI in 1160, hence became subject only to the emperors. For more than 500 years, Lucca remained as an independent republic.

At the end of the 12th century, Lucca and other cities of Tuscany created an alliance to fight the neighbour feudal lords and subjugate their lands. This allowed Lucca and Florence in particular to control large territories and to compete for military supremacy in the region. The 13th century was characterised by political fights inside many communes, including Lucca. As a consequence, the republic witnessed the rise of the populist faction and change in government structure, as well as participating in a long series of wars between Guelphs and Ghibellines. In 1273 and again in 1277 Lucca was ruled by a guelph capitano del popolo (captain of the people) named Luchetto Gattilusio.

Lucca in the 14th century became one of the most important cities of the Italian Middle Ages. There were many noble families in power, such as the Nuccorini, who from 1300 to 1371 were enrolled in the Supreme Magistrate of the Elderly. Dante Alighieri included many references to the great feudal families that had jurisdiction there, with administrative and judicial powers. Dante himself spent many of his years in exile in Lucca.

In 1314, internal discord allowed Uguccione della Faggiuola to make himself lord of Pisa and then to conquer Lucca. Revolts in the two cities quickly ended Uguccione's regime. In Lucca, the citizens gave the lordship over their Republic to the ghibelline Castruccio Castracani, member of the House of Antelminelli and leader of great political and military capacity. His reign represented the highest peak of the Republic's power, whose territories included the Garfagnana to the north, the coast from the city of Carrara to Pisa to the west, the city of Pistoia to the east (under the codomain of Lucca and Florence), and south the Valdarno constantly disputed with the Republic of Florence. Castracani also succeeded in making Lucca the only antagonist to the expansion of Republic of Florence leading to the victory in the Battle of Altopascio, in 1325, where he defeated the powerful Florentine army chasing them up to the walls of Florence.

When Castruccio died, the city fell into a period of anarchy which saw it subject at first to the dominion of a military company, which had Marco from the House of Visconti as its leader and hostage at the same time. Later the republic was repeatedly sold to different lords who were unable to exploit it due to the hostility of the Republic of Florence. Subsequently, it was acquired by the Republic of Pisa and administered by its Lord, Giovanni Dell'Agnello.

Having regained its freedom in 1370, Lucca returned to a republican government and with its foreign policy gained public profile in Europe due to its bankers and the silk trade.

In the thirteenth century Lucca became an important silk manufacturing center thanks to the arrival of immigrant weavers from Sicily. It was known for brocaded silks with decorative designs of Byzantine or Chinese inspiration repeated diagonally rather than vertically. From the early fifteenth century on, its workshops turned out silk fabrics decorated with religious scenes as well as patterned velvets.

Lucca achieved international fame for its workmanship of the more elaborate and costly fabrics, thanks to its technological edge in weaving and dyeing, and its closely guarded monopoly over advanced technologies such as looms and combs for brocades and velvets and the silk twisting mill. Lucca's skilled artisans could match the best wares of Damascus. Until the end of the Renaissance the Tuscan city was the main Italian center of production for silk cloths, exported all over Europe and even to Asia: when the Portuguese arrived in Calcutta in the early sixteenth century, they found Lucca silk in the bazaars.

== Renaissance and onwards ==
Merchant flag of the Republic of Lucca, including the word Libertas (13th century-1799)

During the 15th century the republic was of less importance than the two great republics of Florence and Siena. In the first decades of the century, Lucca falls under the pseudo-tyranny of the Guinigi family.

A judgment of the important historian Giovanni Sercambi from Lucca has been preserved on this period, he especially highlights the conferment of all offices to supporters of the dominant family and also mentions the provisions to prevent the largest assembly of citizens (the General Council) from meeting. The role of this was taken by a Commission made up of twelve or eighteen partisans of the ruling house. Sercambi remembers more generally the restriction of all expenses, except those in favour of the mercenaries, considered indispensable to not live in continuous fears and dangers, and which had to be kept happy, as well as the secret acts of violence committed to get rid of the most rebels dangerous.

The alliance between the Republic at the time was controlled by the Guinigi family and the Duchy of Milan led Lucca into the ruinous war against the Republic of Venice and Republic of Florence; towards the end of this war, an insurrection finally ended the dominion of the Guinigi family and the republic had to negotiate in order not to lose its independence, which led it to lose parts of its former territories.

In 1429 Florence besieged Lucca to take revenge on the republic. After several days of siege, the Republic of Lucca asked the Duchy of Milan for help. The Duchy sent Francesco I Sforza, who overwhelmed the Florentines with his army and forced them to retreat. A few days after the retreat of the Florentines, the inhabitants of Lucca arrested Paolo Guinigi, the leader of the republic, because he was said to have dealt with the Florentines. Florence later paid Sforza to abandon Lucca and, in 1430, Lucca was besieged once again. During the siege, the Florentines tried to stem the Serchio to flood Lucca, but due to some errors, the Florentine camp flooded. Meanwhile, the Lucchesi asked again for help from Filippo Maria Visconti, duke of Milan, who, once again, acted indirectly (according to a previous treaty Milan could not interfere in the affairs of Florence) asking the Republic of Genoa to help Lucca. Genoa, relying on an ancient alliance with Lucca, asked Florence not to disturb Lucca. When Florence refused, Genoa sent an army of 6,000 men led by Niccolò Piccinino who attacked the Florentines on the Serchio and, after a bloody battle, they were forced to withdraw because the Lucchesi had taken them behind leaving the city.

Merchants from “Luca” living in London appear in English court records during the medieval period, including members of the Podeo family—Lawrence, Nicholas, and Joan—in 1452.

Lucca managed, first as a democracy and, after 1628, as an oligarchy, to preserve its independence alongside Venice and Genoa. The word Libertas (“Liberty”) was displayed on its banners until the French Revolution of 1789. This strong republican spirit found one of its most remarkable expressions in the figure of Francesco Burlamacchi. He belonged to the influential Burlamacchi family, one of the most prominent families in the history of the republic, whose members held more than seventy elections to the office of Gonfaloniere and other supreme magistracies over the centuries. In the 1540s, Francesco conceived an ambitious plan to free the cities of Tuscany and northern Italy from the influence of the major regional powers. His objective was to establish a league of independent republics inspired by the ideals of civic liberty that Lucca had preserved for generations. The conspiracy was discovered before it could be carried out, and under pressure from Emperor Charles V and Cosimo I de' Medici, Burlamacchi was arrested, handed over to imperial authorities, and executed in 1548. Although his project failed, he came to be remembered as a symbol of Italian republican resistance and as a precursor to the idea of political unity in the peninsula, anticipating by more than three centuries the ideals that would eventually culminate in the unification of Italy.

Merchants from "Luca" living in London appear in English Court records (the plea rolls of the Court of Common Pleas), during the Medieval period, for example: the Podeo family: Lawrence, Nicholas, and Joan, in 1452.

Lucca managed, at first as a democracy, and after 1628 as an oligarchy, to maintain its independence – alongside Venice and Genoa. It painted the word Libertas on its banners, until the French Revolution in 1789. Lucca was the third largest Italian city-state with a republican constitution ("comune") to remain independent over the centuries, as larger Venice and Genoa also did.

== The end of the Republic ==

=== Early 19th century ===
Flag of the Jacobin State of Lucca (early 1799 and 1800–01)

After the war of the First Coalition, which ended with the Treaty of Campo Formio, the Government of the Republic of Lucca decided to start negotiations with the newly formed Cisalpine Republic with the aim of maintaining its independence. The jurist Luigi Matteucci, the father of the more famous Felice, was sent to Milan to negotiate with Napoleon.

The republic was the only territory in all of continental Italy that the French army had not yet invaded and Matteucci's proposals were rejected, so much so that on 22 January 1799 the French troops entered the city, overthrowing the oligarchic republic and establishing a new centralized republic, with a democratic constitution, under the French protectorate. The constitution granted the government to an Executive Directory, with a bicameral legislature composed of the Council of Juniors and the Council of Seniors. The democracy did not last long.

Maritime flag of the Republic of Lucca (1803–1805)

On 17 July 1799, during the war of the Second Coalition, the Austrian Habsburg army occupied Lucca and established a Provisional government. Upon Napoleon's return from Egypt, however, the situation reversed just as quickly. On 9 July 1800, the French occupied the city, installing a provisional government under the control of Antoine Christophe Saliceti. A new constitution for the State of Lucca was published in 1801, restoring the office of Consul of Justice as the president of the Executive branch, with a parliament called the Great Council. The oligarchy was restored.

In 1805, the governance of Lucca was taken over by Napoleon, who merged the State of Lucca with the Principality of Piombino to become the Principality of Lucca and Piombino (1805–1809). He put his favoured sister Elisa Bonaparte Baciocchi in place to rule, his only female sibling to gain political power. Elisa began rule as the Duchess of Lucca and Princess of Piombino, based at Villa Reale di Marlia.

== See also ==
- Duchy of Lucca — post-Napoleon (1815–1847)
- Grand Duchy of Tuscany — (1569–1801) and (1815–1859)

== Bibliography ==
- Chisholm, Hugh, ed. (1911). "Lucca" . Encyclopædia Britannica (11th ed.). Cambridge University Press.
- Romiti, Antonio (1982). "La classe politica lucchese nei primi anni di libertà". Archivio Storico Italiano. 140 (2): 179–195. JSTOR 26211241.
- Guelfi Camaiani, Pier Giorgio (1983). Un patriziato di fronte alla Rivoluzione Francese. La Repubblica oligarchica di Lucca dal 1789 al 1799. Florence: Leo S. Olschki.
- Manselli, Raoul (1987). La repubblica di Lucca. Turin: UTET. ISBN 978-88-7750-167-7.
- Adorni-Braccesi, Simonetta (1994). «Una città infetta». La Repubblica di Lucca nella crisi religiosa del Cinquecento. Florence: Leo S. Olschki. ISBN 978-88-2224-208-2.
- Bratchel, M. E. (1995). Lucca 1430–1494: The Reconstruction of an Italian City-Republic. Oxford: Oxford University Press. doi:10.1093/acprof:oso/9780198204848.001.0001. ISBN 978-01-9820-484-8.
- Miller, Peter N. (2001). "Stoics Who Sing: Lessons in Citizenship from Early Modern Lucca". The Historical Journal. 44 (2): 313–339. doi:10.1017/S0018246X01001790. JSTOR 3133610.
- Cresseri, Elena (2010). "La Repubblica di Lucca tra fedeltà all'Impero e adesione alla Spagna". Feudi imperiali in Italia tra XV e XVIII secolo: atti del convegno di studi, Albenga-Finale Ligure-Loano, 27-29 maggio 2004. Rome: Bulzoni. pp. 451–462. doi:10.1400/194088.
- Sabbatini, Renzo (2012). Le mura e l'Europa: aspetti della politica estera della Repubblica di Lucca, 1500-1799. Milan: Franco Angeli. ISBN 978-88-5686-104-4.
- Burlamacchi, Leo (2018). La bufera napoleonica in un piccolo stato italiano: dalla Repubblica di Lucca al Principato di Elisa Baciocchi. Lucca: Maria Pacini Fazzi editore. ISBN 978-88-6550-614-1.
- Giovannini, Francesco (2020). Storia dello Stato di Lucca. Lucca: Pacini Fazzi. ISBN 978-88-6550-752-0.
- Lucarelli, Giuliano (2023). «Libertas». La Repubblica di Lucca risorta a stato autonomo 1369-1450. Lucca: Pacini Fazzi. ISBN 978-88-6550-879-4.
