= Çanakkale =

- Municipality
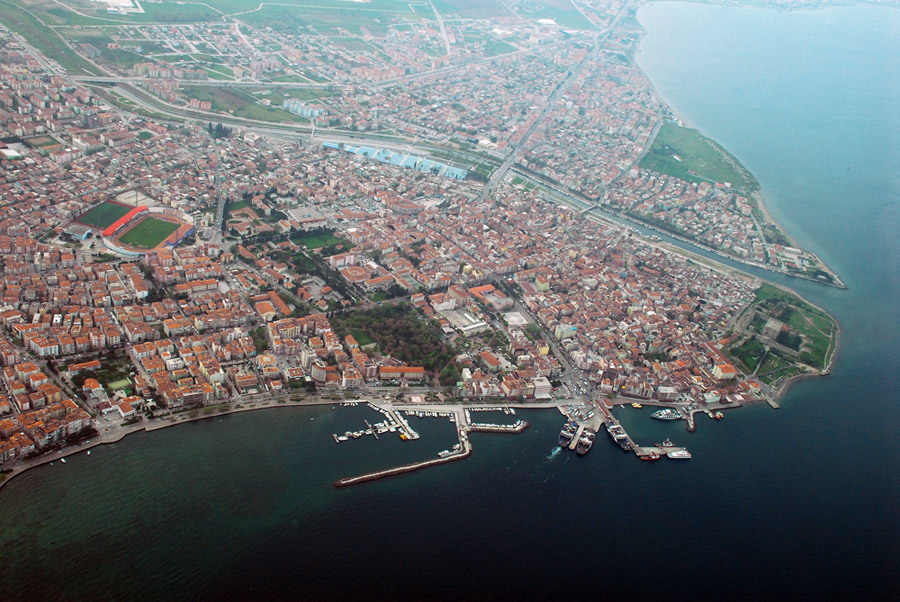
- Aerial view of the city centre

- Coat of arms

- Location within Turkey Location within Marmara
- Coordinates: 40°09′07″N 26°24′20″E
- Country: Turkey
- Province: Çanakkale
- District: Çanakkale

Government
  - Mayor: Muharrem Erkek (CHP)
- Elevation: 2 m (6.6 ft)
- Population (2021): 143,622
- Time zone: UTC+3 (TRT)
- Postal code: 17000
- Area code: 0286
- Website: www.canakkale.bel.tr

Çanakkale (Turkish: [tʃaˈnakkale]), formerly known in English as Dardanelles, (Note: /ˌdɑːrdəˈnɛlz/ DAR-də-NELZ; outdated Greek: Δαρδανέλλια, romanized: Dardanéllia; now usually Τσανάκκαλε, Tsanákkale.) is a city and seaport in Turkey on the southern shore of the Dardanelles at their narrowest point. It is the seat of Çanakkale Province and Çanakkale District. Its population is 143,622 (2021).

Çanakkale is the nearest major urban centre to the ancient city of Troy, which (together with the ancient region of the Troad) is also located inside Çanakkale Province. The wooden horse from the 2004 film Troy is exhibited on the Çanakkale waterfront.

Today Çanakkale is the main base for visits to the ruins of Troy and to the First World War cemeteries at Gallipoli. Particularly around 18 March and 25 April (Anzac Day) when there are major celebrations of the events of the war the town is heavily visited.

Çanakkale Airport is 3 kilometres (1.9 mi) from the city centre. AJet has daily flights from Ankara. Intercity buses run to Bursa, Istanbul and İzmir.

== Name ==
Çanakkale was originally the site of an Ottoman fortress called Ḳalʿa-i Sulṭānīye (Ottoman Turkish: قلعهٔ سلطانیه, lit. 'fortress of the sultan'; Turkish: Sultaniye Kalesi). From the late 17th century onwards it became known for its glazed Çanakkale ceramics, compared by the traveler Richard Pococke to Delftware, hence the later name Çanak Kalesi "Pottery Castle". This was adopted as the official name for the town in 1890, although having already been in use a century earlier.

The Greek-Byzantine name for Çanakkale was Dardanellia, from which the English name Dardanelles is derived. Many accounts by 19th-century visitors to the town refer to it as Dardanelles.

From around 1920, the British began to call Çanakkale 'Chanak' and 'Kale Sultanie' in their reporting.

== History ==
=== Prehistory and ancient history ===
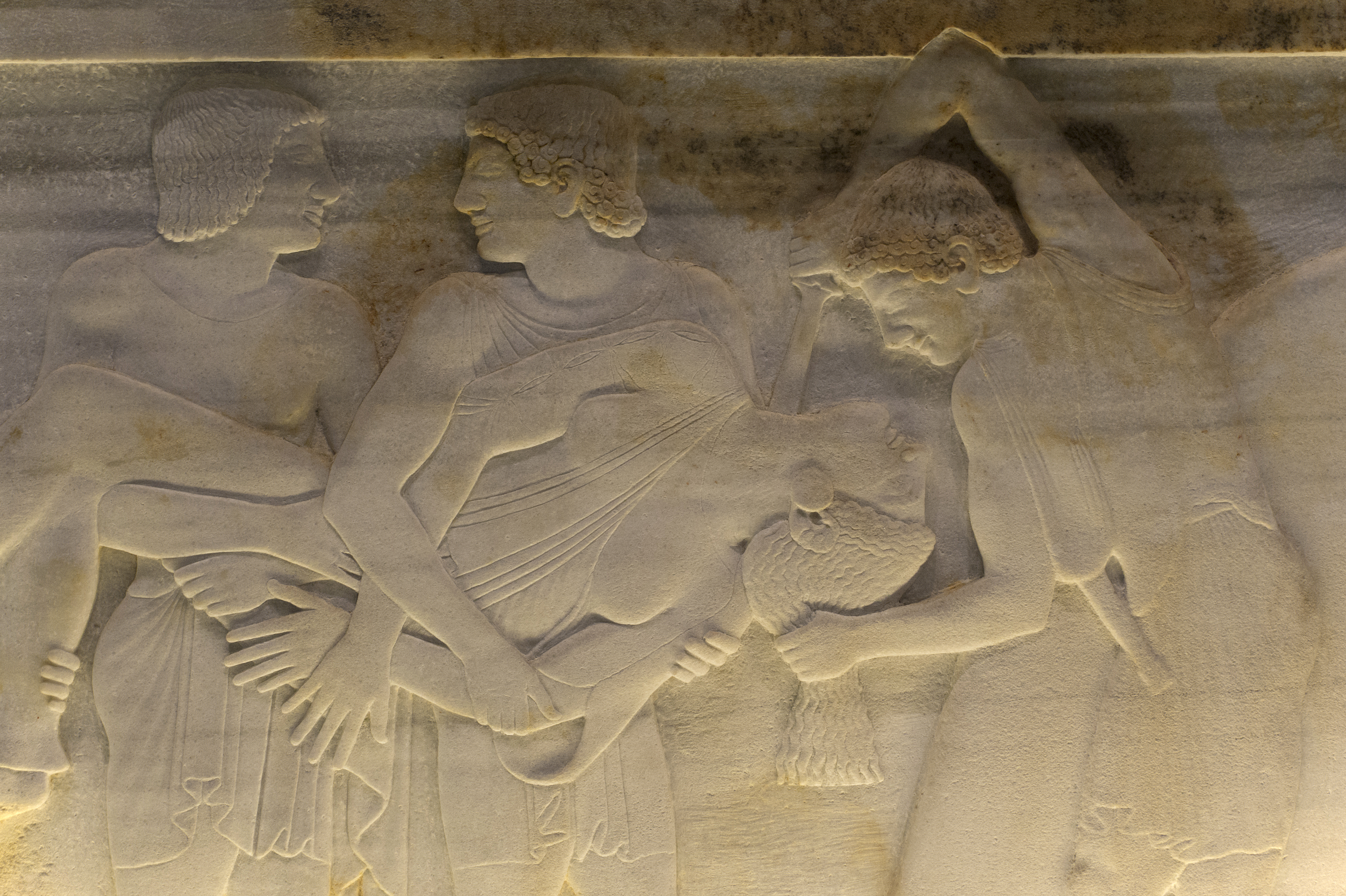
The Polyxena sarcophagus found at the Kızöldün Tumulus, the oldest known tumulus of Hellespontine Phrygia, currently on display at the Troy Museum.

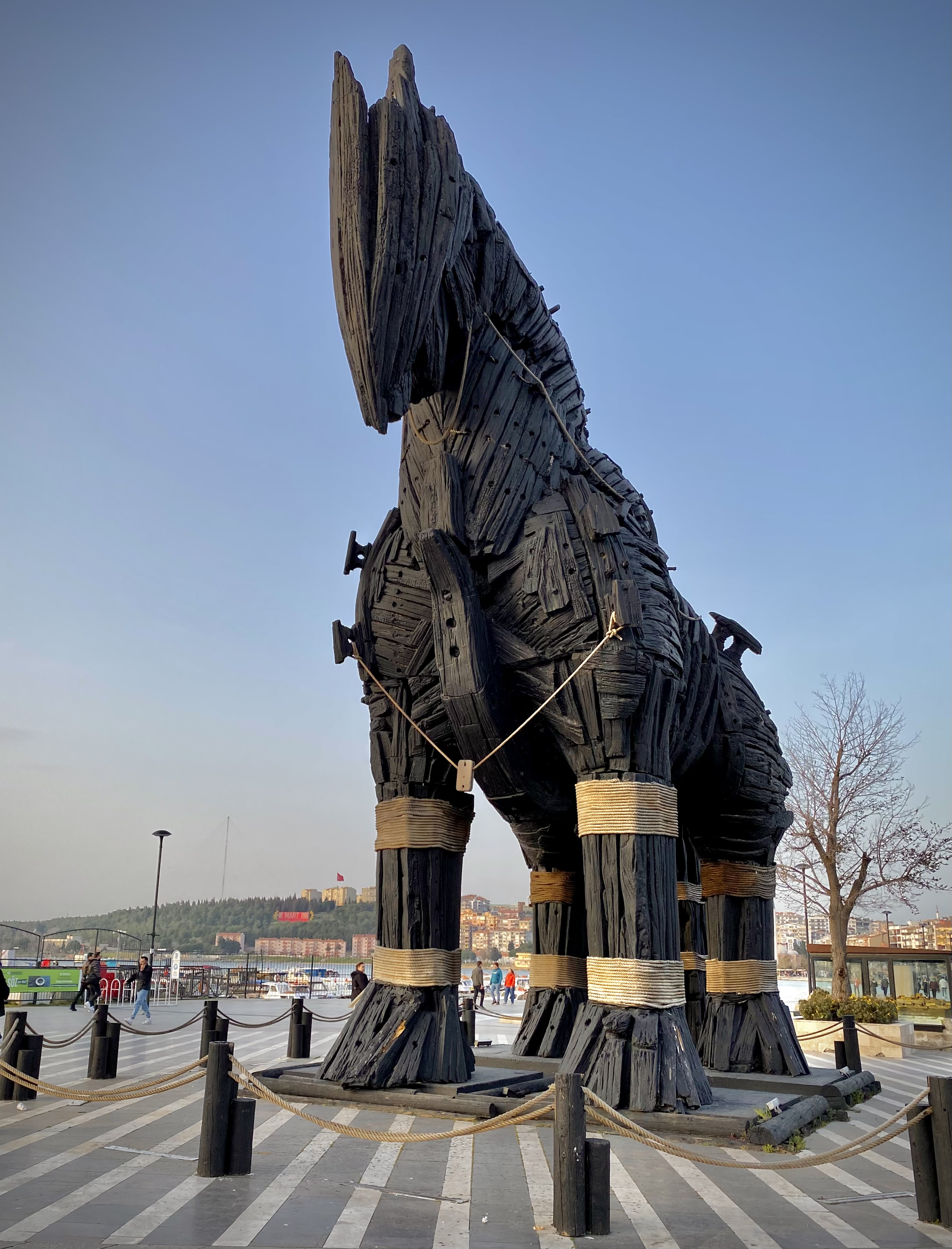
The Trojan horse that appeared in the 2004 film Troy now stands on the Çanakkale waterfront.

The first inhabitants of the area lived on the Biga Peninsula in the Last Chalcolithic Age c. 6,000 years ago. However, very little is known about their identity and lifestyle. According to some excavations and research, the earliest settlements in the area were established at Kumtepe. Kumkale is thought to have been established in 4000 BC and Troy between 3500 and 3000 BC.

Aeolian Greeks settled here in the 8th century BC and quickly established trading colonies. The region came under the control of the Lydians in the 7th century BC and under the control of the Persians in the 6th century BC. Aeolis fell under the control of the Ancient Macedonian army after Alexander the Great defeated the Persians beside the Granicus River in the Battle of the Granicus on his way to Asia in 334 BC. The region came under the government of the Kingdom of Pergamon in the 2nd century BC. The western part of the Biga Peninsula where ancient Troy is situated used to be called Troas (the Troad). The settlement of Alexandria Troas was an important free port and trade centre in Roman times. In the 2nd century AD, the region was attacked by Goths from Thrace. During the 7th and 8th centuries, Arabs hoping to attack Constantinople passed through the strait several times and reached as far as Sestos

=== Ottoman era ===
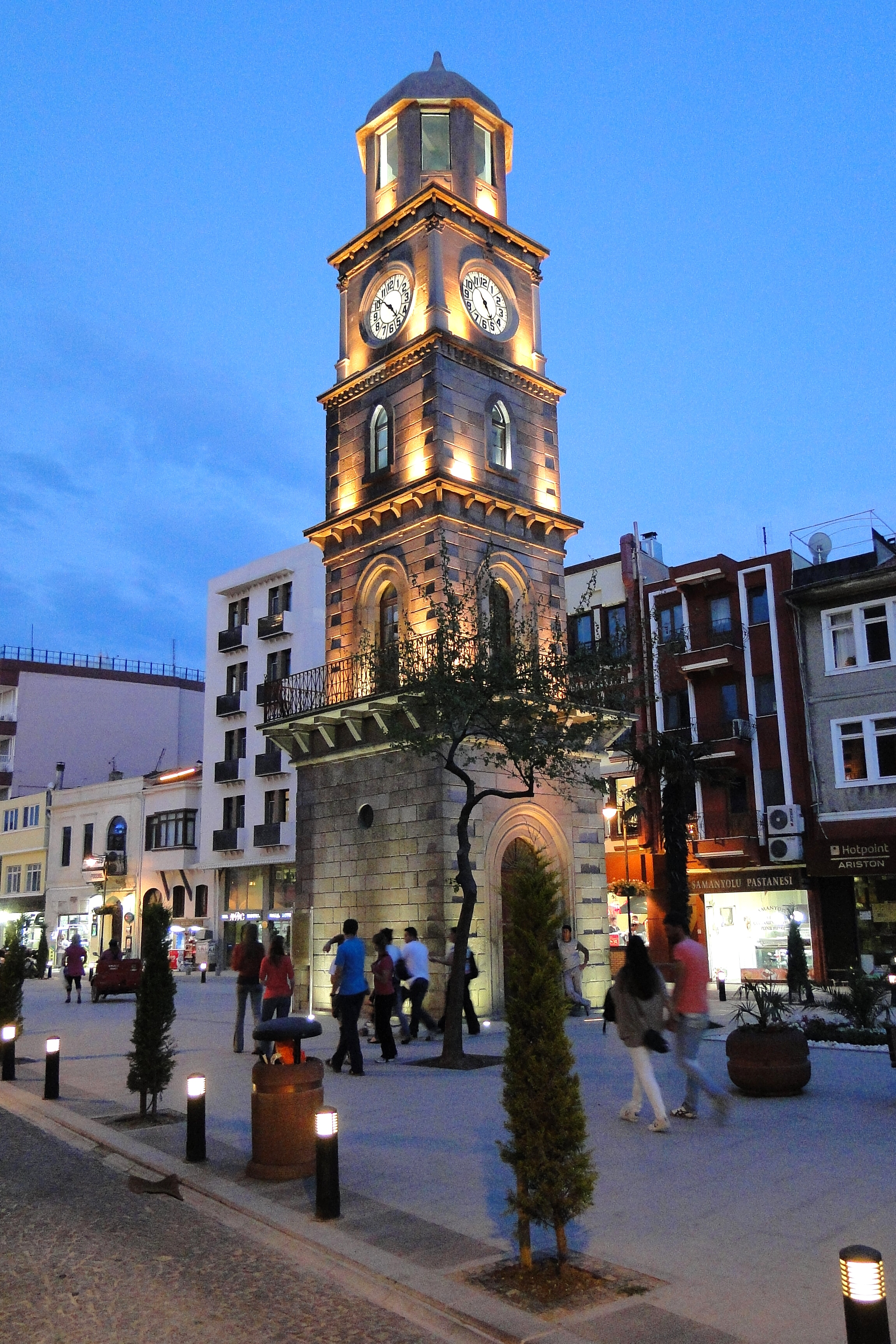
Çanakkale Clock Tower (1896) in the city centre

At the start of the 14th century, the Karasids under Demirhan Bey controlled the Anatolian side of the strait. The Ottomans first gained control of Gallipoli in 1367. In 1462, Mehmed II had the Kale-i Sultaniye fortress built on the site now occupied by Çanakkale - it takes it names from the fact that one of the Sultan's sons had collaborated in its construction. Kale-i Sultaniye was built at the narrowest point of the Dardanelles and, together with the fort of Kilitbahir on the opposite side, provided effective in controlling traffic through the strait. The two forts were quickly dubbed "The Castles", and a town developed to the north-east of Kale-i Sultaniye.

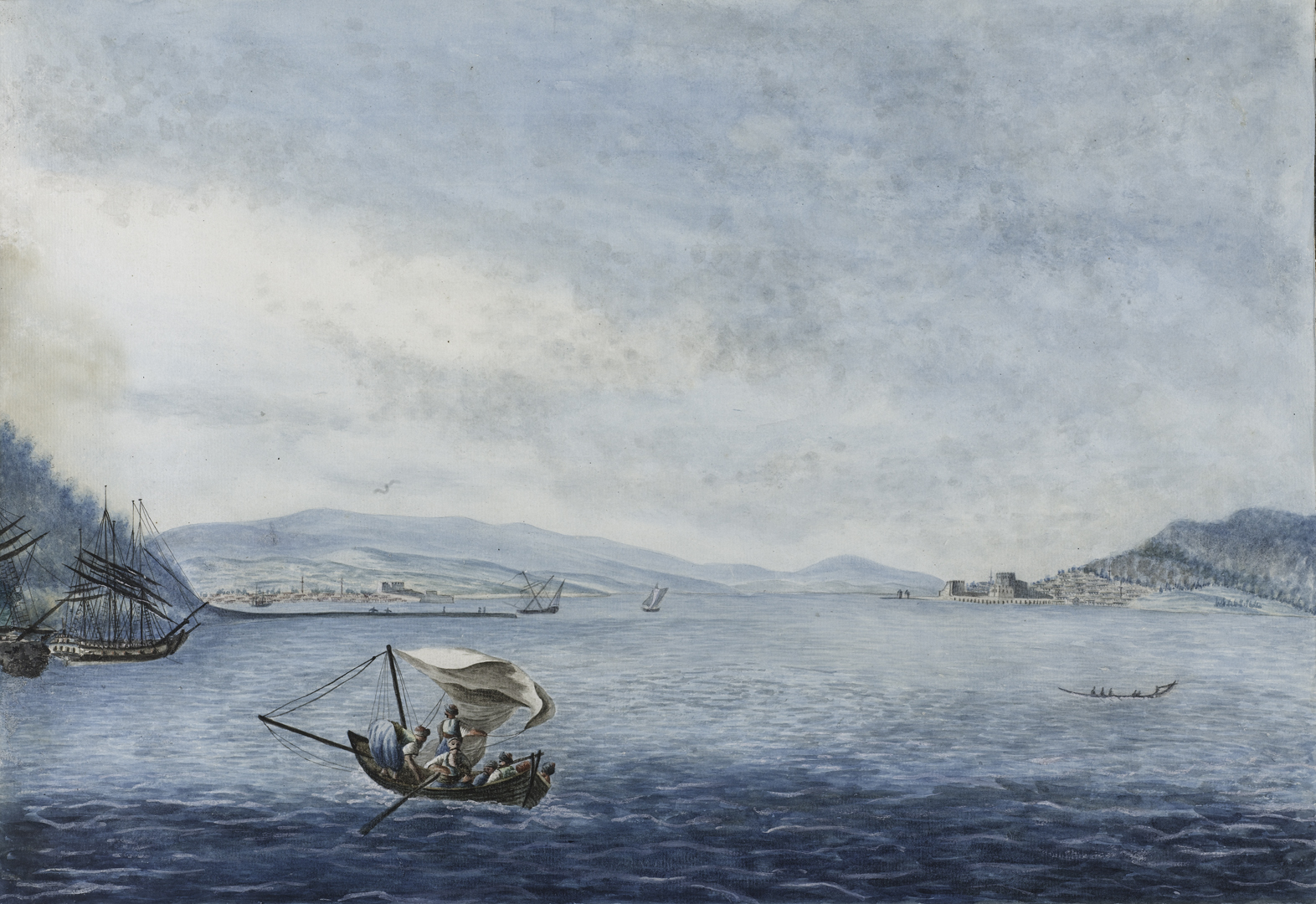
Painting of Çanakkale – Cape Abydos. Entrance to the Bosphorus by Clara Barthold Mayer, late 18th century.

From the late 15th century onwards, some Jewish refugees expelled from Spain settled in Çanakkale and formed a sizeable community which thrived by supplying local shipping with provisions and acting as consular agents for many European nations. Into the late 19th century the Jewish community adopted Spanish as their mother-tongue. Some 1,805 Jews were registered there in 1890, out of a population of 10,862, the rest being Muslims (3,551), Orthodox Greeks (2,577), Armenians (956) and assorted foreigners (2,173).

=== Twentieth century ===
In 1915, during the First World War, Britain and France attempted to secure the Dardanelles with a view to capturing Constantinople. What is known in the West as the Gallipoli Campaign, or the Dardanelles Campaign, is referred to as the Battle of Çanakkale (Turkish: Çanakkale Savaşı) in Turkey. In March 1915 the Royal Navy failed to force the Dardanelles and suffered severe losses. In a series of operations, HMS Triumph, HMS Ocean, HMS Goliath, HMS Irresistible and the French battleship Bouvet were all sunk. The French submarine Joule and the Australian submarine AE2 were also destroyed and several other important ships were crippled. Most of the damage was inflicted by mines, though a German U-boat and Turkish small craft also contributed.

In 1920, the city was estimated to have a population of approximately 22,000. A busy port, it was a stopping point for vessels traveling through the strait, as it had been in the ancient past although the British who passed through described it as lacking good quality accommodation or resources. Goods exported from the port included wine, hides, pottery, ceramic tiles and grain.

== Attractions ==
=== In Çanakkale ===
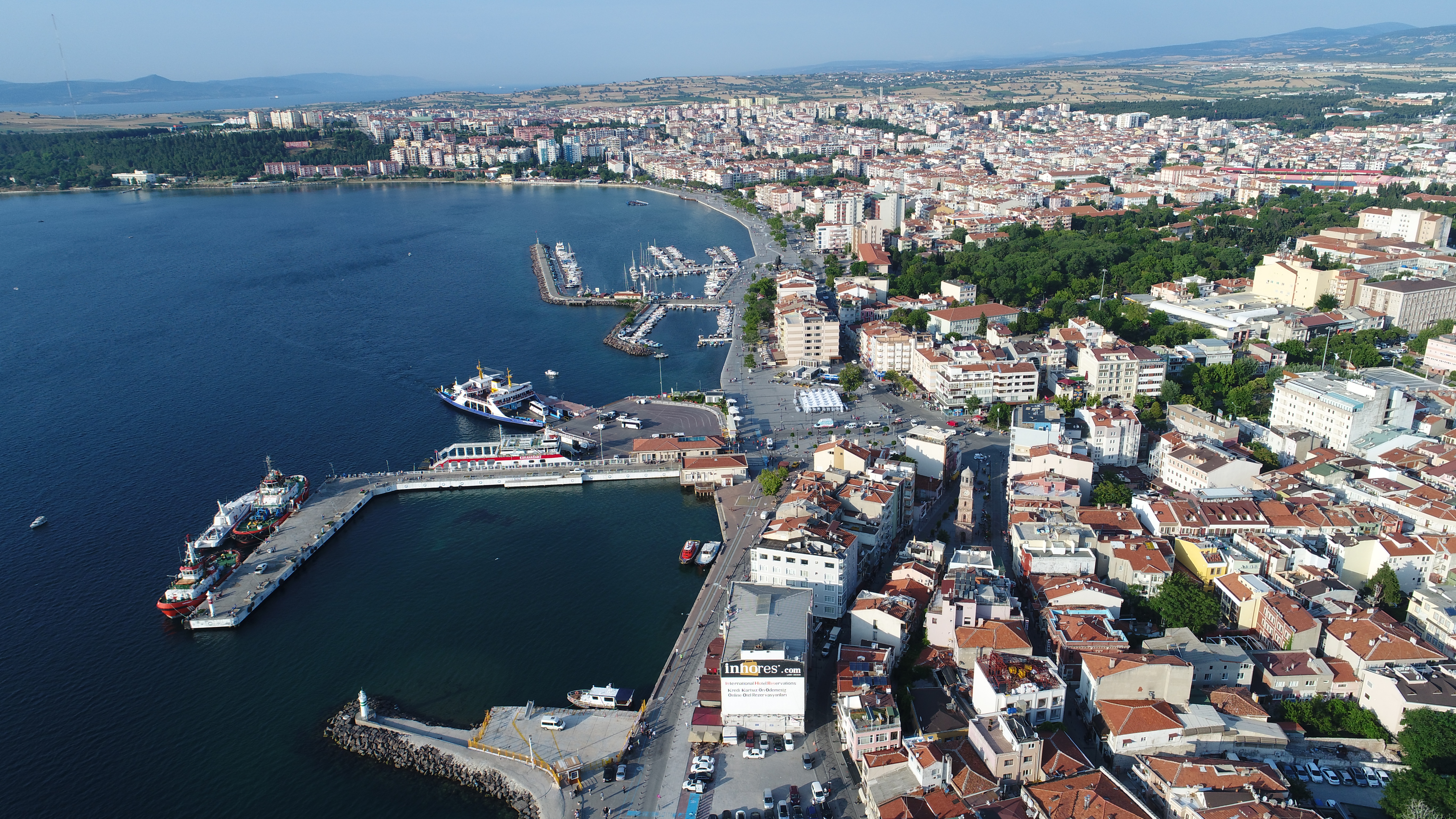
Aerial view of Çanakkale Port

In Çanakkale town the old Kale-i Sultaniye is now called Çimenlik Kalesi and is open to the public as a military museum and art gallery. It also contains a replica of the mine-layer Nusret who used to relay mines removed from the Dardanelles by the Allied forces during the First World War.

A late 19th-century clocktower acts as a signpost for the older part of town where narrow streets are filled with bars, cafes and hotels. Also in this older part of the town is a relatively new Kent Müzesi (City Museum) which lays out the more recent history of the town. (The contents of the old Çanakkale Archaeology Museum have been moved to the new Troy Museum.)

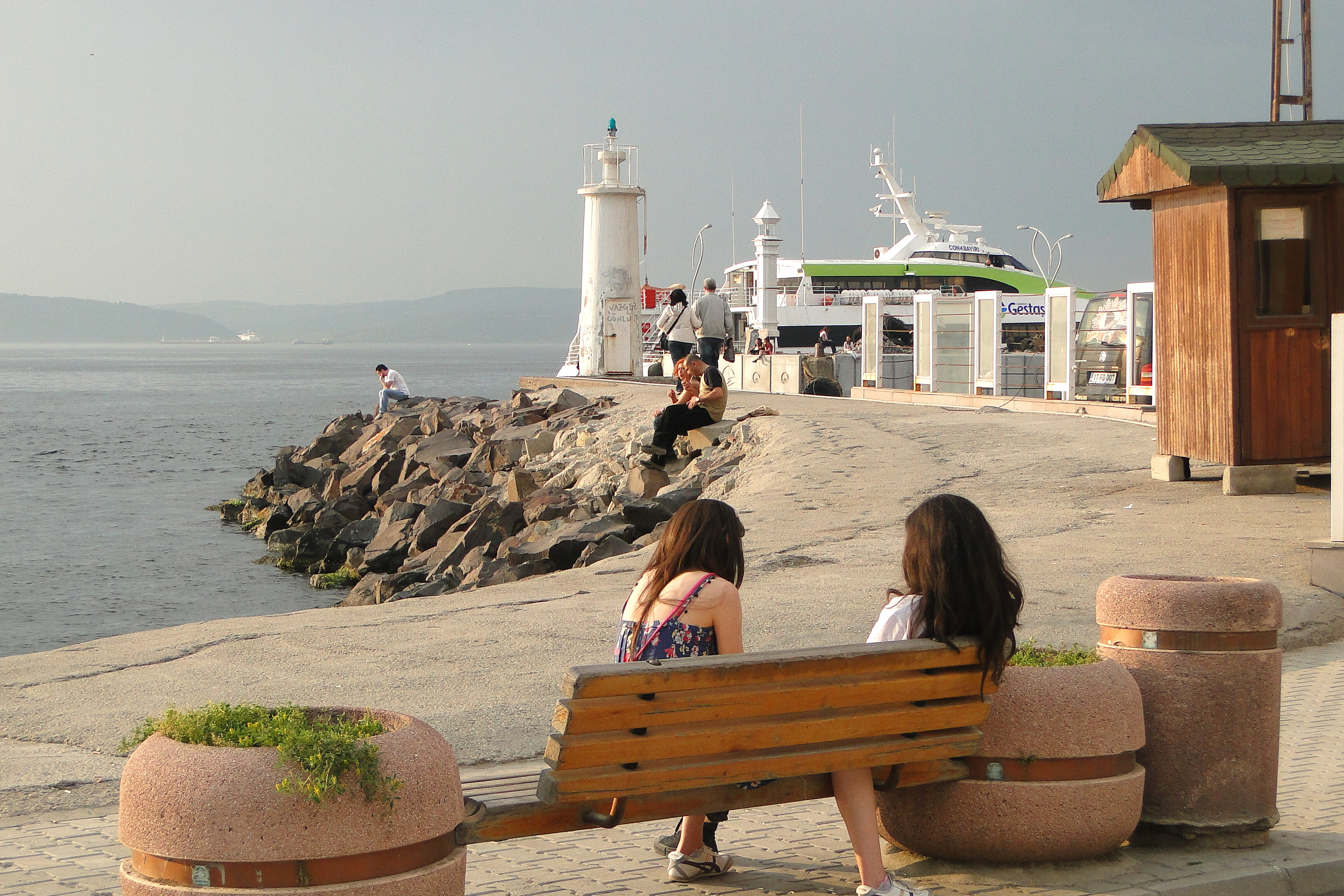
Çanakkale waterfront

The most attractive part of town in the evenings is the wide waterfront promenade where the wooden horse created for the film Troy starring Brad Pitt and Orlando Bloom can be seen. Many cafes and restaurants line up here to take advantage of the view of the Dardanelles.

=== Around Çanakkale ===
Regular ferries pass back and forth between Çanakkale and Kilitbahir where the second castle that was built to guard the Dardanelles is open to visitors.

All the tour operators in Çanakkale offer tours of the Gallipoli Battlefields and Troy, sometimes on the same day. It is easy to reach Troy by minibuses from Çanakkale, although exploring the battlefields without a private car is not so easy.

In summer it is also easy to reach Gökçeada -one of two inhabited Aegean islands that belong to Turkey- by ferry from Çanakkale. In winter bad weather may prevent the ferries from sailing.

== Çanakkale Ceramics ==
From the 17th century, Çanakkale appears to have had a thriving ceramics industry which seemed to have expanded as its competitors in İzmik and Kütahya went into decline. The produce of the kilns was, however, less sophisticated than that of the other two major centres, and by the late 19th century it appears to have been producing much pottery specifically aimed at the tourist market. Until recently the folksy quality of much Çanakkale ware, in particular its rather clumpy animal and plant-shaped pots, were tended to be sneered at. However, these same pieces are now very popular with collectors.

== Climate ==
Çanakkale has a Mediterranean climate (Köppen: Csa or Trewartha: Cs) with hot, dry summers and cool, humid winters. Winds are strong year long, particularly in winter months.

Highest recorded temperature:39.7 °C (103.5 °F) on 1 August 2021
Lowest recorded temperature:−11.5 °C (11.3 °F) on 2 February 1929

Climate data for Çanakkale (1991–2020, extremes 1929–2023)
Month	Jan	Feb	Mar	Apr	May	Jun	Jul	Aug	Sep	Oct	Nov	Dec	Year
Record high °C (°F)	20.6 (69.1)	21.3 (70.3)	27.3 (81.1)	30.8 (87.4)	38.9 (102.0)	38.5 (101.3)	39.2 (102.6)	39.7 (103.5)	35.9 (96.6)	31.8 (89.2)	27.7 (81.9)	22.9 (73.2)	39.7 (103.5)
Mean daily maximum °C (°F)	9.8 (49.6)	10.5 (50.9)	13.1 (55.6)	17.4 (63.3)	23.0 (73.4)	28.4 (83.1)	31.4 (88.5)	31.5 (88.7)	26.7 (80.1)	21.1 (70.0)	16.1 (61.0)	11.5 (52.7)	20.0 (68.0)
Daily mean °C (°F)	6.5 (43.7)	7.0 (44.6)	9.1 (48.4)	12.8 (55.0)	18.0 (64.4)	22.9 (73.2)	25.8 (78.4)	26.0 (78.8)	21.6 (70.9)	16.8 (62.2)	12.3 (54.1)	8.3 (46.9)	15.6 (60.1)
Mean daily minimum °C (°F)	3.6 (38.5)	4.0 (39.2)	5.7 (42.3)	9.0 (48.2)	13.7 (56.7)	17.9 (64.2)	20.8 (69.4)	21.2 (70.2)	17.1 (62.8)	13.1 (55.6)	8.9 (48.0)	5.5 (41.9)	11.7 (53.1)
Record low °C (°F)	−11.0 (12.2)	−11.5 (11.3)	−8.5 (16.7)	−1.6 (29.1)	2.3 (36.1)	6.6 (43.9)	11.2 (52.2)	9.4 (48.9)	5.9 (42.6)	0.4 (32.7)	−7.0 (19.4)	−10.5 (13.1)	−11.5 (11.3)
Average precipitation mm (inches)	78.6 (3.09)	76.3 (3.00)	66.0 (2.60)	49.0 (1.93)	32.1 (1.26)	27.3 (1.07)	12.9 (0.51)	6.8 (0.27)	24.2 (0.95)	67.5 (2.66)	79.2 (3.12)	100.4 (3.95)	620.3 (24.42)
Average precipitation days	10.8	10.63	9.53	8.43	5.57	4.53	1.77	1.23	3.33	6.47	8.13	11.37	81.8
Average snowy days	2.09	2.3	0.61	0.04	0	0	0	0	0	0	0.22	1.35	6.61
Average relative humidity (%)	82.1	81	79.3	77.3	74.7	69.9	64.9	65.5	69.4	76.8	80.8	82.2	75.3
Mean monthly sunshine hours	91.3	117.6	164.4	206.9	271.4	309.1	341.3	321.1	248.3	177.2	115.7	82.7	2,427.8
Mean daily sunshine hours	3.0	4.2	5.3	6.9	8.8	10.3	11.0	10.4	8.3	5.8	3.9	2.8	6.7
Source 1: Turkish State Meteorological Service
Source 2: NCEI(humidity, sun 1991-2020), Meteomanz

== Education ==
Within the boundaries of the city there are 13 high schools and a college. Çanakkale Onsekiz Mart University has 12 faculties, four institutes, nine four-year college programs and 14 vocational schools and serves more than 52,000 students. Thirty percent of the city's population are college graduates.

== Notable people from Çanakkale ==
- Tevfik Rüştü Aras (1883–1972), politician
- Zeynep Bastık (born 1993), singer
- Nuri Bilge Ceylan (born 1959), film director, screenwriter, film producer and photographer
- Güney Dal (born 1944), writer
- Metin Erksan (1929–2012), film director
- Onur Tuna (born 1985), actor
- Mustafa Tutkun (born 1972), activist

== International relations ==
- Canberra, Australia
- Kerch, Ukraine
- Pardubice, Czech Republic
- Pomezia, Italy
- Osnabrück, Germany

== See also ==
- Battle of Gallipoli
- Chanak Crisis
