= Mustafa Tutkun =

Turkish activist (born 1972)

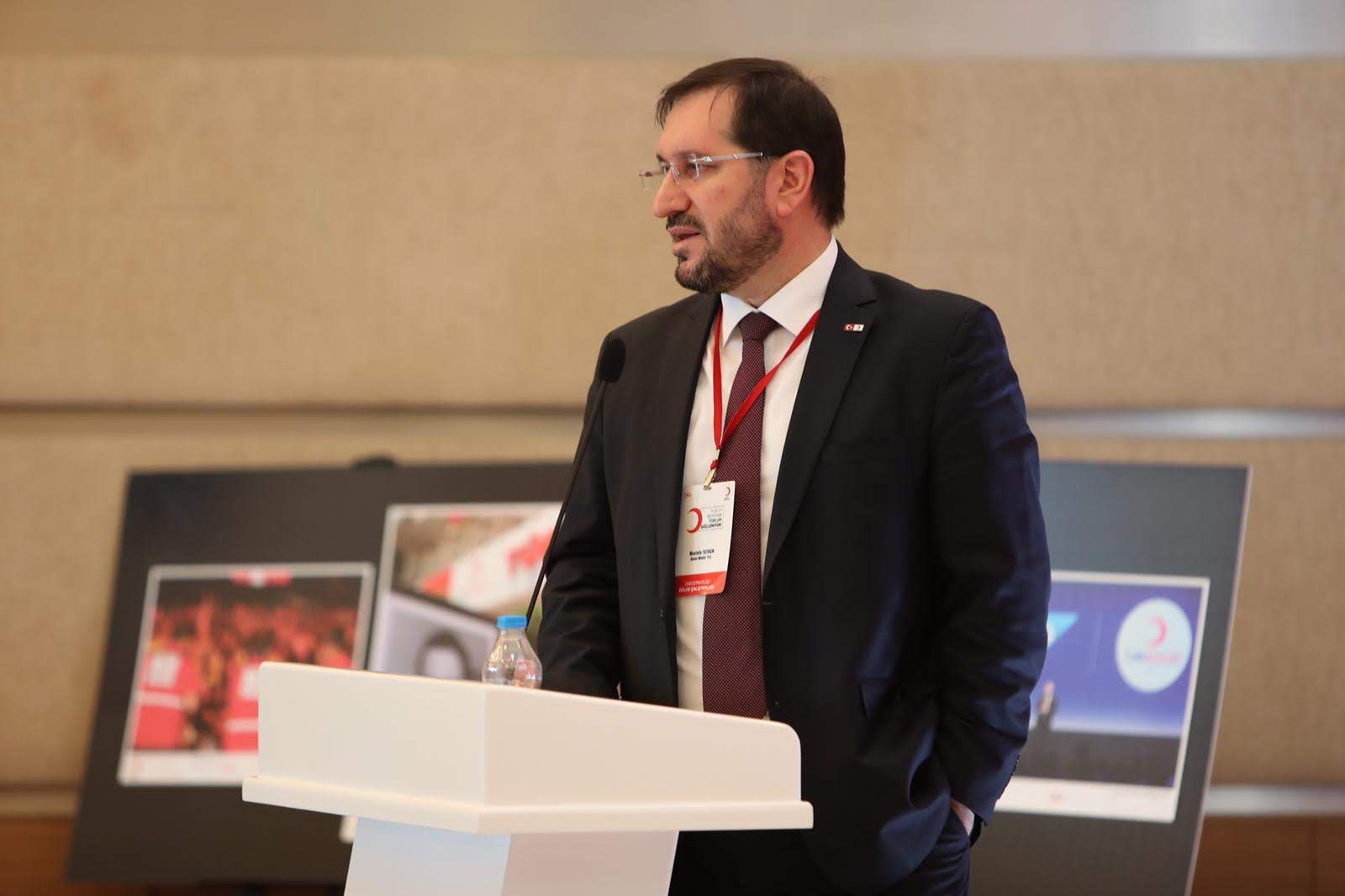
- Mustafa Tutkun is giving a seminar in 2019.
- Born: July 1, 1972 (age 54); Biga, Çanakkale, Turkey
- Occupations: Humanitarian Activist, Social Worker
- Writing career
- Language: Turkish
- Years active: 1994–present
- Website: www.linkedin.com/in/mtutkun/

Mustafa Tutkun (born July 1, 1972) is a humanitarian activist and, a civil society worker in Turkey. Since the Kosovo war in 1999, he has worked in the humanitarian field. He has coordinated many relief operations in different countries during emergencies.

== Early life ==
He was born in Çanakkale, in 1972. He was the youth leader of his community for several years. When he came to Istanbul to study in Yıldız Technical University, he became a human rights activist in the university. This led him to leave his study and go to Malaysia for social studies.

== Humanitarian career ==
After graduating from International Islamic University, Political Science-International Relations, June 1999, he went to Kosovo for his first humanitarian activities. He worked with UNMIK and established a local NGO in Kosovo named "Istanbul International Association of Relief & Culture".

He organised humanitarian assistance to the Macedonian refugees during the Macedonian civil war in 2001.

Until today he has successfully coordinated or implemented various humanitarian or development projects in more than 130 countries:

- Management of Relief operations and rehabilitation programs in Gaza - 2009

- Coordination of seasonal programs in more than 130 countries since 2005

- Coordination of Humanitarian Aid operations in Bangladesh for Rohingya Refugees

- Construction of 103 Houses for flood victims in Mozambique - 2008

- Management of Relief operations and reconstruction of a school for spastics in Lebanon - 2006

- Construction of 14 Schools in Pakistan for earthquake victims - 2007

- Management of Relief operations and solar water systems in Niger - 2005–2007

- Management of Relief operations and Refugee Camps in Pakistan - 2005

- Coordination of Tsunami relief activities in Aceh, Indonesia
