= Kumtepe =

Coordinates: 39°58.34′N 26°11.38′E

Kumtepe is the oldest permanent settlement in the Troad, the region in northwestern Anatolia, where later Troy was built. Kumtepe has four layers, Kumtepe IA, IB, IC and II. The last two have been largely disturbed in the twentieth century. The remaining and relatively undisturbed IA and IB are of special interest to the archaeologists, because these are older than other settlements in the region.

Around 4800 BC the first settlement in Kumtepe was founded. The inhabitants lived on fishing, and their diet included oysters. The dead were buried, but without grave gifts. Although Kumtepe belongs to Neolithic, the occupants used also copper. Around 4500 BC the settlement was abandoned.

Around 3700 BC new settlers came to Kumtepe. The people of this new culture, Kumtepe B, built relatively large houses with multiple rooms, sometimes a porch. They also practiced animal husbandry and agriculture. The main domestic animals were goats and sheep, bred not only for meat but for milk and wool as well. They knew lead and bronze along with copper. Shortly after 3000 BC Yassıtepe and Hisarlık (Troy) were colonized probably from Kumtepe.

== Literature ==
- Birgit Brandau. Troia Eine Stadt und ihr Mythos, 1997.
- Jak Yakar. Troy and Anatolian Early Bronze Age chronology // Anatolian Studies, 1979.
