= Çanakkale ceramics =

Çanakkale ceramics date back to the 17th century. They were born from Iznik ceramics, which were known as the pinnacle of the Turkish art of ceramics and very popular in the Ottoman Empire during the 14th and 15th centuries. Iznik ceramics were sculpted using earthenware, a clay-based putty substance, and on rare occasions, beige-colored clay. They also contained blue and white decorations, with brush strokes easily visible, sharing characteristics with traditional pottery and elite craftsmanship of the Ottoman era. When they became the favorite style of ceramics, Çanakkale ceramics adopted these elements for their own design.

== Appearance ==
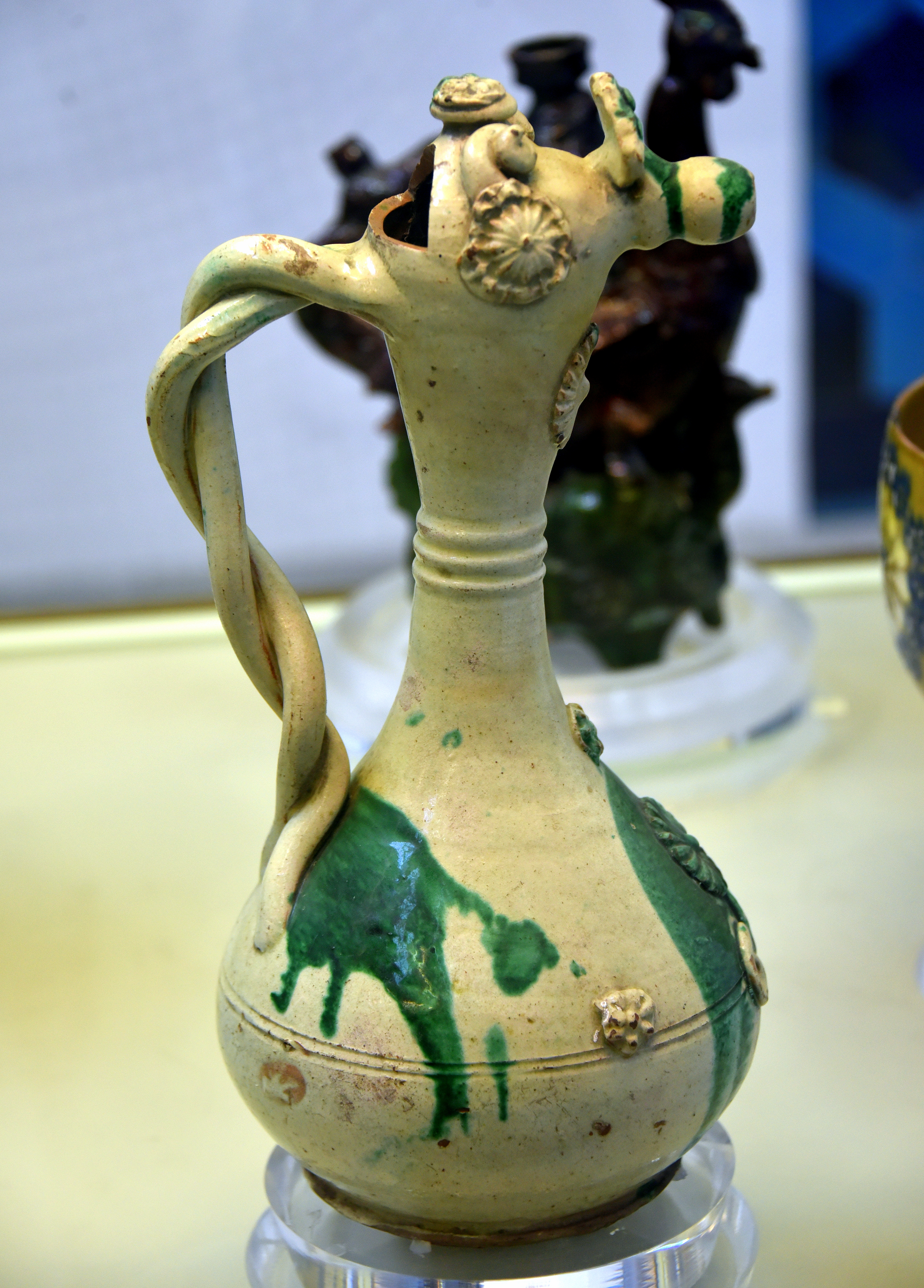
Glazed jug with rosette decoration

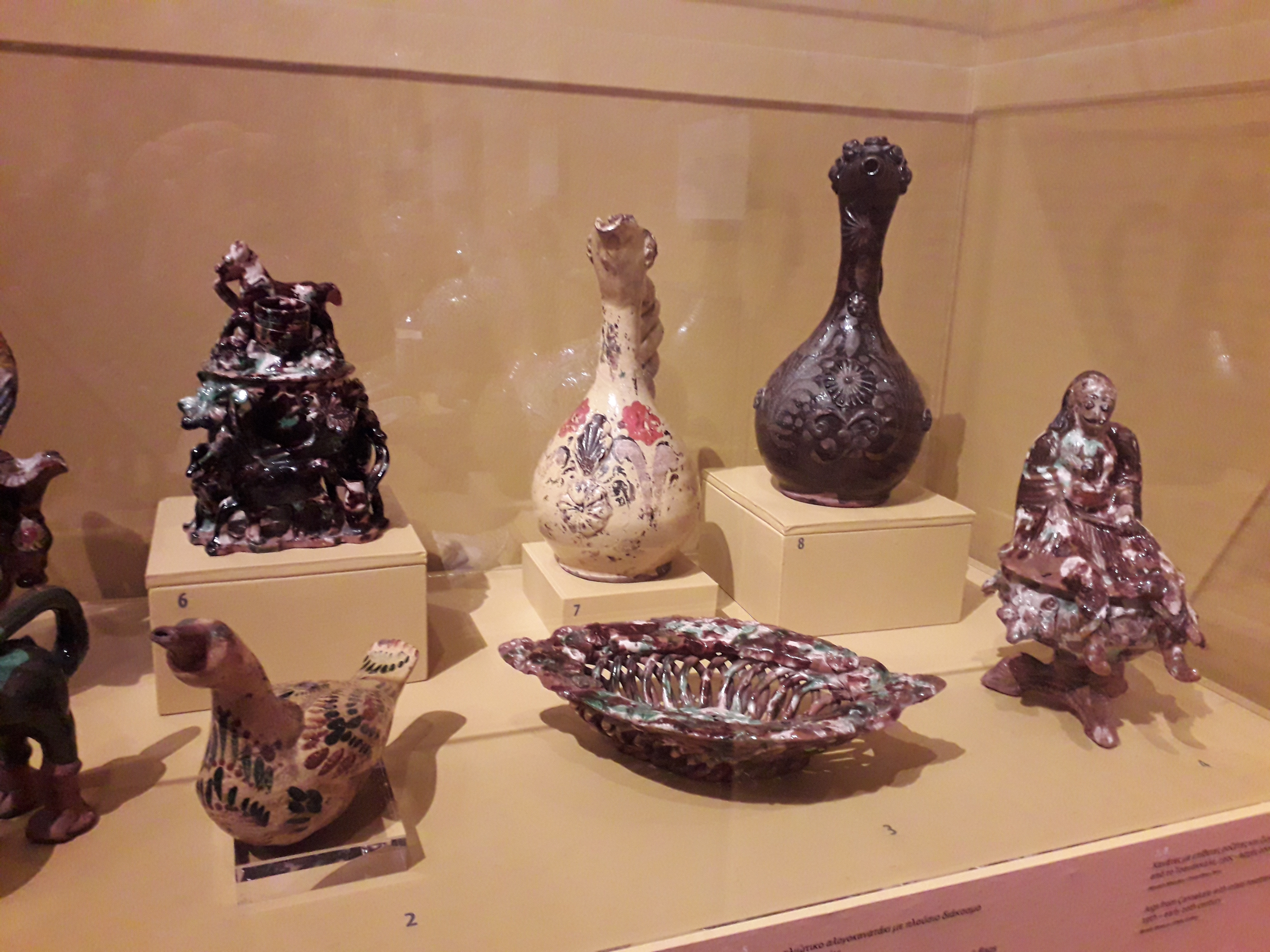
Various Çanakkale ceramics

The making of Çanakkale ceramics was often a very time-consuming process. Çanakkale ceramics were often painted with over with creamy glazes (usually clear). They were, however, very diverse in appearance, including plates, open and closed bowls, long necked bottles, gas lamps, vases, and even animal figurines, (mostly the 19th and 20th centuries), among many others. The ceramics would be coated with either red earthenware or engobe, then left out in the sun to dry, after which they would be painted. The technique of cross-hatching was used to design the patterns on the ceramics.

== Popularity ==
It wasn't until the 17th century that Çanakkale ceramics became very popular. When production of Iznik ceramics decreased, Çanakkale ceramics took their place. Much of their popularity stemmed from their use as souvenirs. Because of Çanakkale's geographic location, many foreigners would travel there and purchase these ceramics not for their daily use, but instead as gifts. Çanakkale is located in western Anatolia, and the prefix, "Çanak," comes from the Turkish words for bowls, which may explain the name of the town (the place where pottery is made). Çanakkale ceramics also became very popular in Western society, as well, in the 19th century. The popularity of Çanakkale ceramics, however, decreased greatly in the 20th century.
