= Ancient Greek mercenaries =

Account of mercenary warfare in Ancient Greece

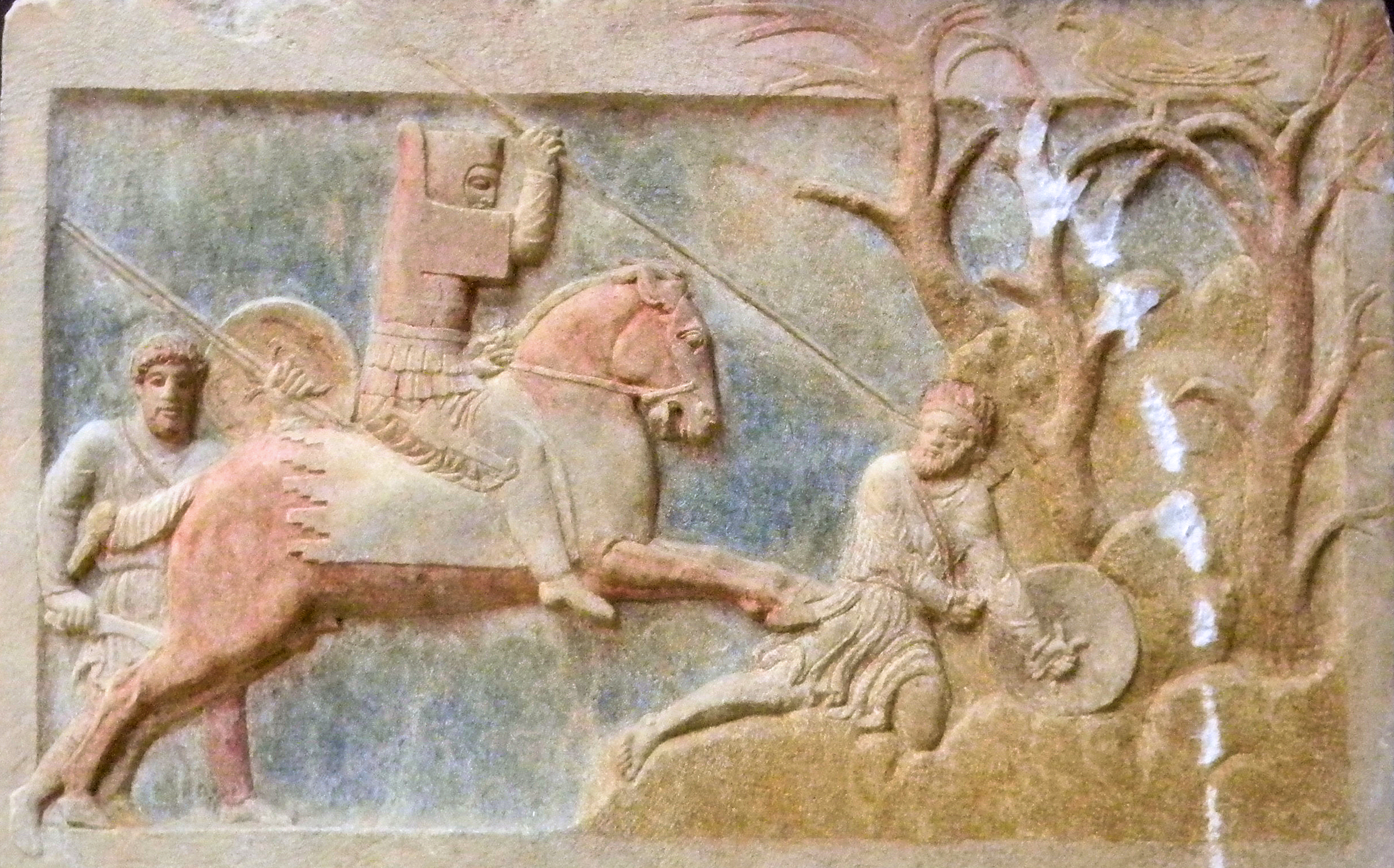
A Greek mercenary (left) in the service of an Achaemenid Dynast of Hellespontine Phrygia (center) attacking a Greek psiloi (right) at the time of Pharnabazus II, Altıkulaç Sarcophagus, early 4th century BC.

There is evidence of mercenaries (misthophoroi (plural), misthios (singular male), misthia (singular female) in Greek) being hired in Ancient Greece from the 6th century BC. The tyrants of that time hired bodyguards from other city-states. It is not known if earlier Aegean armies and navies, such as the Minoans and Mycenaeans, used mercenaries.

Mercenary troops from Caria and Ionia are known to have fought with Psamtik I against the Assyrians. These were the "bronze men from the sea" whose arrival in Egypt, according to Herodotus, was foretold to Psamtik by an oracle. They entered the country as raiders but Psamtik made a truce with them and hired them to his cause. Afterwards, he granted land to them alongside the Nile and they are traditionally held to have been the first Greeks to settle in Egypt.

In the 5th century BC, Arcadian soldiers fought for Xerxes I in 480 when he led the Persian invasion of Greece. Later in the century, many Greek mercenaries were employed by Persian satraps, especially in Anatolia. During the Peloponnesian War, mercenaries from Thrace and other outlying regions were hired by both sides as hoplites and peltasts. In 401 BC, many Greeks supported Cyrus the Younger in his campaign against Artaxerxes II and fought at the Battle of Cunaxa. The Ten Thousand (401–399) were a Greek mercenary army made famous by Xenophon, one of their generals, when he wrote his Anabasis.

Through the 4th century BC, mercenaries were widely employed as is shown by the careers of such as Iphicrates, Chares and Charidemus. Many fought for the Persians when they reconquered Egypt. The majority of the Phocian army in the Third Sacred War were mercenaries. Philip II of Macedon was heavily reliant upon mercenaries until he had built up the Macedonian army which became his legacy to Alexander the Great. Alexander in his turn was confronted by Greek mercenaries when he invaded the Persian Empire. Mercenary service continued to flourish through the Hellenistic period.

== 2nd millennium BC ==
The term misthophoros originally applied to someone who worked in return for payment by salary. That included hired labour and the word was very soon applied to hired professional soldiers and sailors. Armed forces in Minoan Crete and Mycenae may essentially have been citizen armies and navies but, according to the Trojan War legend, the Mycenaeans relied heavily on their alliance with other Greek city-states. Whether or not either side employed mercenaries is open to speculation but what can be said is that complete details of the organisation and structure of Bronze Age armies are unclear to us and the employment of mercenaries cannot be excluded.

After the Egyptian Pharaoh Rameses II (r.1279–1213 BC) defeated the Sherden sea pirates at the beginning of his reign, he hired many of them to serve in his bodyguard. It has been suggested that some of them were from Ionia. In the reign (1213–1203 BC) of his successor Merneptah, Egypt was attacked by their Libyan neighbours and some experts believe that the Libyan army included mercenaries from Europe. Among them were people termed Ekwash and it has been proposed that this meant Achaean, but there is no certainty of that as other evidence points to an attempted encroachment by Libyans only upon neighbouring territory.

== 8th and 7th century BC ==
Ancient literary sources reveal that during the 8th and 7th centuries BC, Greek mercenaries were hired by several eastern kingdoms, including Assyria, Syria, Cilicia, and Palestine.

In either 669 or 668 BC, the first Battle of Hysiae was fought between the armies of Argos and Sparta. As Hysiae is in Argolis, it is assumed that the Spartans had invaded. The Argives won the battle and so repulsed the invasion. Argos, then ruled by Pheidon II, thus confirmed its continuing dominance in the Peloponnese, unbroken since the Dorian invasion and it is thought that this was the peak of Argive power. The battle marked a turning point in both Greek and military history as it caused the Spartans to adopt the phalanx of hoplites as their key strategy in place of the loose spear-throwing formations prevalent until then. The phalanx was to revolutionise warfare.

It is in the 7th century that mercenaries are mentioned in the lyric poetry works of Alcaeus and Archilochus.

Argos went into decline after the death of Pheidon c.655 but tyrannies became common throughout the Greek world, starting with Cypselus of Corinth from c.655 to c.625. He was succeeded by his son Periander to c.585. He was contemporary with Thrasybulus, tyrant of Miletus from c.615 to c.590. These three turned Corinth and Miletus into major trading centres and there was an alliance between the two. The tyrants hired mercenaries to form their personal bodyguards and to accompany their merchant vessels on trading missions to protect them from pirates. Thrasybulus had the additional problem of annual attacks being mounted by the Lydians but he strengthened the Milesian defence system and was able to withstand the attacks from Lydia. He eventually concluded a peace treaty with Alyattes.

Ostraca discovered at the Judean fortress of Tel Arad, dated to around 640 BC, contain Hebrew inscriptions that suggest a Greek presence in the Near East. These messages, addressed to a man named Eliashib, instruct the delivery of wine, bread, and oil to the "Kittim", referring to Greek mercenaries in the service of Judah.

Greek mercenaries were also serving the king of Tyre.

In the first half of the first millennium BC, Egypt was under the control of foreign powers, including Assyria, Libya, and the Kushite Kingdom. Psammetichus I, an Egyptian prince, aimed to restore native rule and turned to Ionian and Carian mercenaries for support. After successfully regaining independence, he established the 26th Dynasty and rewarded the mercenaries with positions in his army and also granted them land at Naucratis to found a new settlement.

== 6th century BC ==
A noted Cretan mercenary of this time was Hybrias. He was also a lyric poet and left a skolion (drinking song) called the spear-song in which he proclaimed himself a great warrior: "I have great wealth – a spear, a sword and a fine shield to save my skin. With these I plough, I reap, I tread the sweet grapes and am called master of my serfs. All those that dare not hold the spear and sword and fine shield to save their skin, all bow and kiss my knee, calling me master and great king".

== 5th century BC ==
Between the decline of the Archaic tyrants and the Peloponessian War there was little need for mercenaries in Greece, due to the prominence of citizen armies. However, a considerable number of Greeks could be found in the service of barbarian nations.

== 4th century BC ==
Greek hoplites were widely admired for their skill as soldiers. The demand led many Greeks who faced poverty or exile to enlist as mercenaries in the pay of another state. Others, not so burdened with worry, became mercenaries through a desire for loot and adventure. In many Greek states, including Athens, the threats from Persia and Macedon required strong defensive forces. One of the main problems in creating and maintaining military strength was that peasant citizens could not afford to abandon their smallholdings for long periods of service and so the demand for professional soldiers increased. The orator Isocrates was highly critical of Athens for employing mercenaries whom he denounced as the "common enemies of mankind". Athenian citizens, he said, must not be "rejoicing in the atrocities of such violent, lawless brigands".

Aristotle accepted that mercenaries were competent but he doubted their courage and loyalty. In his view, mercenaries "become cowards when the danger seems too great for them", being the "first to run" when defeat is imminent. Aristotle argued in favour of citizen soldiers who see flight from battle as a disgrace, preferring death with honour. Mercenaries, said Aristotle, "fear death more than shame".

Stephanus of Byzantium referred to the city Daedala in India as an Indo-Cretan city, likely because it was a settlement of Cretan mercenaries. Tamil poems describe Greek soldiers serving as mercenaries for Indian kings, portraying them as "the valiant-eyed Yavanas, whose bodies were strong and of terrible aspect". Alfred Charles Auguste Foucher suggested that some figures in Gandhara sculptures may represent Greek mercenaries. Additionally, the Cilappatikaram mentions Yavana soldiers, which scholars, including Professor Dikshitar, believe refers to the Greek mercenaries employed by Tamil kings.

== Sources ==
=== Books ===
- Bury, J. B.; Meiggs, Russell (1975) [first published 1900]. A History of Greece (Fourth ed.). London: MacMillan Press. ISBN 0-333-15492-4.
- Drews, Robert (1995). The End of the Bronze Age: Changes in Warfare and the Catastrophe Ca. 1200 BC. Princeton University Press. ISBN 0-691-02591-6.
- Speake, Graham, ed. (1994). Dictionary of Ancient History. London: Penguin Books. ISBN 0-14-044034-8.
- Herodotus (1975) [first published 1954]. Burn, A. R.; de Sélincourt, Aubrey (eds.). The Histories. London: Penguin Books. ISBN 0-14-051260-8.
- Thucydides (1972) [first published 1954]. Warner, Rex; Finley, M. I. (eds.). History of the Peloponnesian War. London: Penguin Books. ISBN 0-14-044039-9.
- Marinovich, Lyudmila [in Russian] (1975). The Greek Mercenarism of the 4th Century B.C. and the Crisis of the Polis. Наука.

=== Online ===
- Skarmintzos, Stephanos (2018). "Ancient Greek Mercenaries in Antiquity". Academia.
- Jones, Peter (16 January 2016). "The mercenaries of IS and ancient Greece". The Spectator.
- Skarmintzos, Stephanos (2018). "How did the use of Mercenaries contribute to the decline of the Greek citizen-soldier during the Hellenistic period?". Academia.
- Cartwright, Mark (27 March 2018). "Ancient Greek Warfare". World History Encyclopaedia.
- O'Brien, Lorcan (16 August 2012). "Greek Mercenaries: Aspects of Greek Mercenary Warfare from the Earliest Times, and Case Studies on the Impact of Mercenaries on Warfare in the Fourth Century". WordPress.
