= Altıkulaç Sarcophagus =

Artifact found in Hellespontine Phrygia

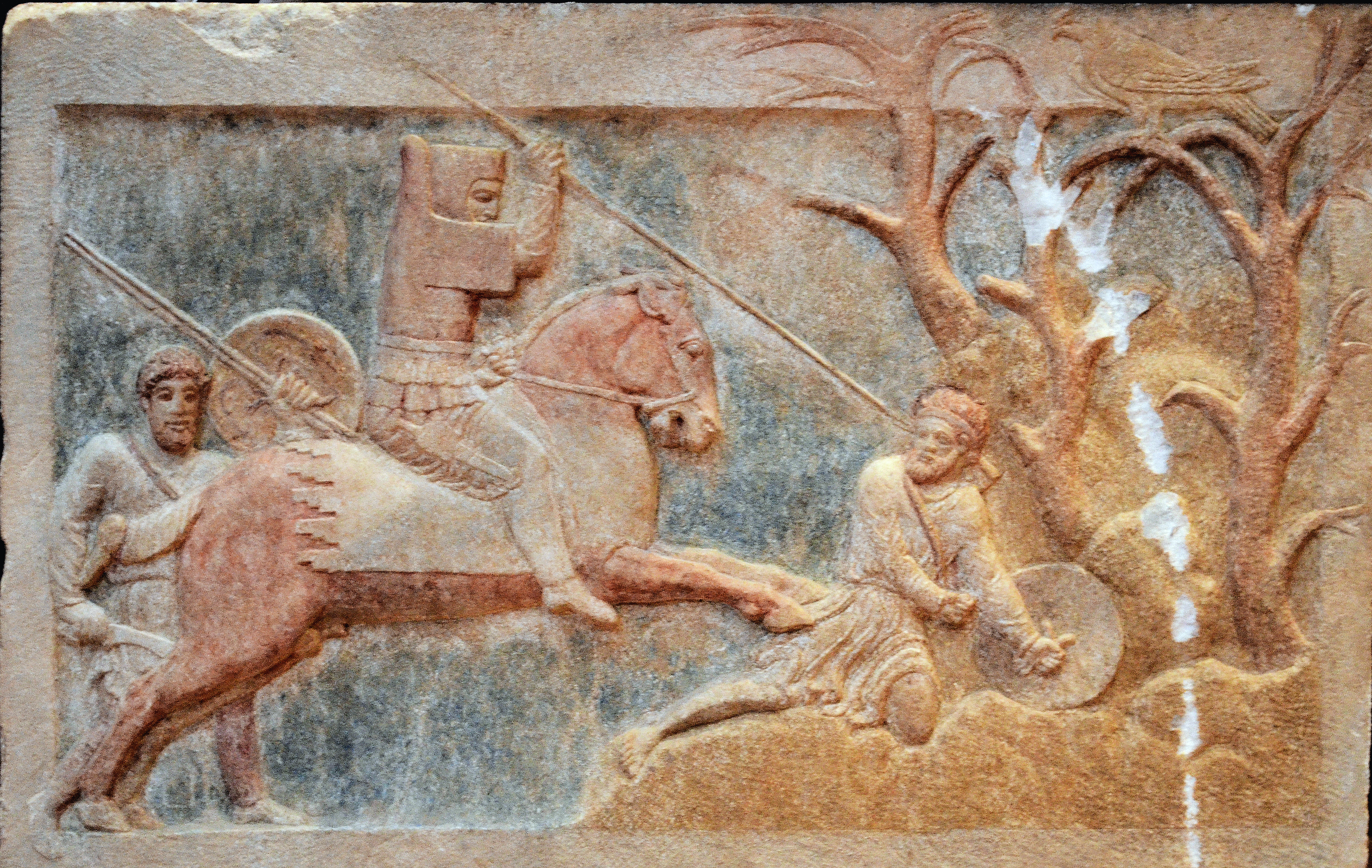
- The sarcophagus and one of its two decorated sides. Battle scene: a Greek mercenary peltast (left) and an Achaemenid dynast of Hellespontine Phrygia (center) attacking a Greek psilos (right), Altıkulaç Sarcophagus, early 4th century BCE. Çanakkale Archaeological Museum
- Material: Marble
- Created: 400–380 BCE
- Present location: Troy Museum, Turkey

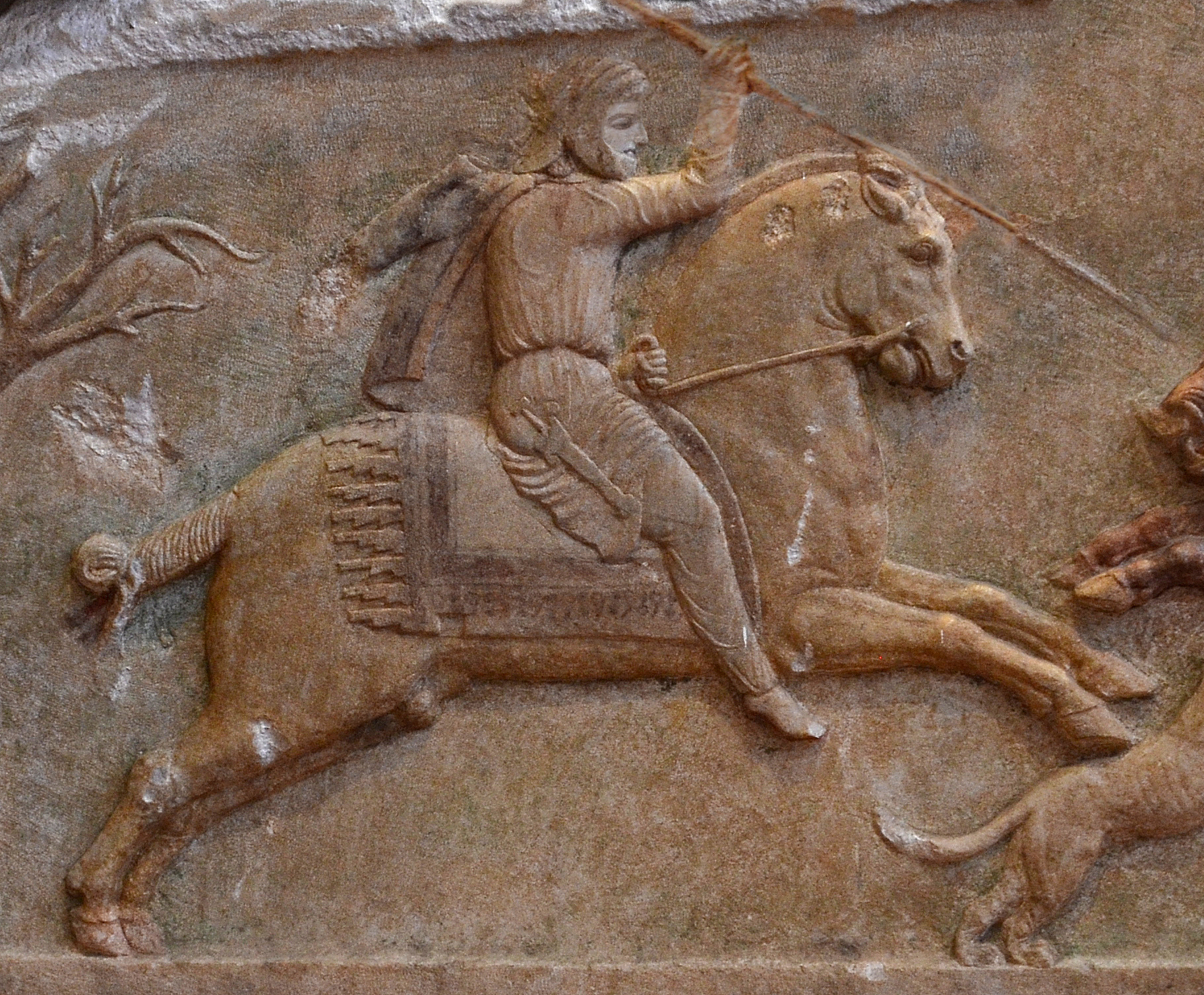
Boar hunting scene (horseman reconstitution).

The Altıkulaç Sarcophagus, or Çan sarcophagus, is an early 4th century BCE (400–375 BCE) sarcophagus. It is sometimes said to be in the Greco-Persian style. The sarcophagus was found in 1998 in a circular corbel-vaulted tomb within the Çingenetepe tumulus, in the village of Altıkulaç, near Çan, in the eastern Troad, about halfway between Troy and Daskyleion, in what was anciently Hellespontine Phrygia. It was looted and damaged in the process, but a large part of the reliefs remained intact. It is made of painted marble carved in low relief, and dated to the 1st quarter 4th century BCE. It was made at about the same time as the famous tombs in Lycia.

The sarcophagus can probably be attributed to an Anatolian dynast of Hellespontine Phrygia. The longer face of the sarcophagus is decorated with two hunting scenes, the hunting of a fallow buck on the left portion, and the hunting of a boar on the right portion. The shorter face of the sarcophagus is decorated with a battle scene, with a mounted, armoured warrior, accompanied by his henchman, spearing a fallen light-armed soldier, probably a Greek psilos. The rider was almost certainly the dynast to whom the sarcophagus belonged. His henchman, judging from his appearance, was probably a Greek mercenary in the service of the cavalryman, a common occurrence at the time.

The other two sides are undecorated. The sarcophagus nevertheless derives from a long tradition of royal iconography in the Near East, especially visible in the tombs of Asia Minor. This iconography also makes a striking parallel between hunting and combat, which are treated on an identical footing. The tombs would have been made during the lifetime of the dynast, and illustrated his deeds during his life.

Given the date and circumstance of this sarcophagus, the dynast who is illustrated in the hunting and fighting scene may have been related to the Satrap of Hellespontine Phrygia, Pharnabazus, who fought again the Greeks on several occasions, particularly against Agesilaos when the latter attacked and ravaged the area around Daskyleion in 395 BCE.

The bones found in the tomb belonged to a male of considerable strength, between 170 and 175 centimetres (67 and 69 in) in height, who died between 25 and 28 years old. He suffered a fall from a considerable height, probably from his horse during combat, many of his limbs having been crushed. He lived for several more years as a cripple, his limbs remaining misaligned, before dying.

The sarcophagus could formerly be seen in the Çanakkale Archaeological Museum, where an earlier, 6th century BCE sarcophagus, the Polyxena sarcophagus, was also on display. Both are now located in the Troy Museum.

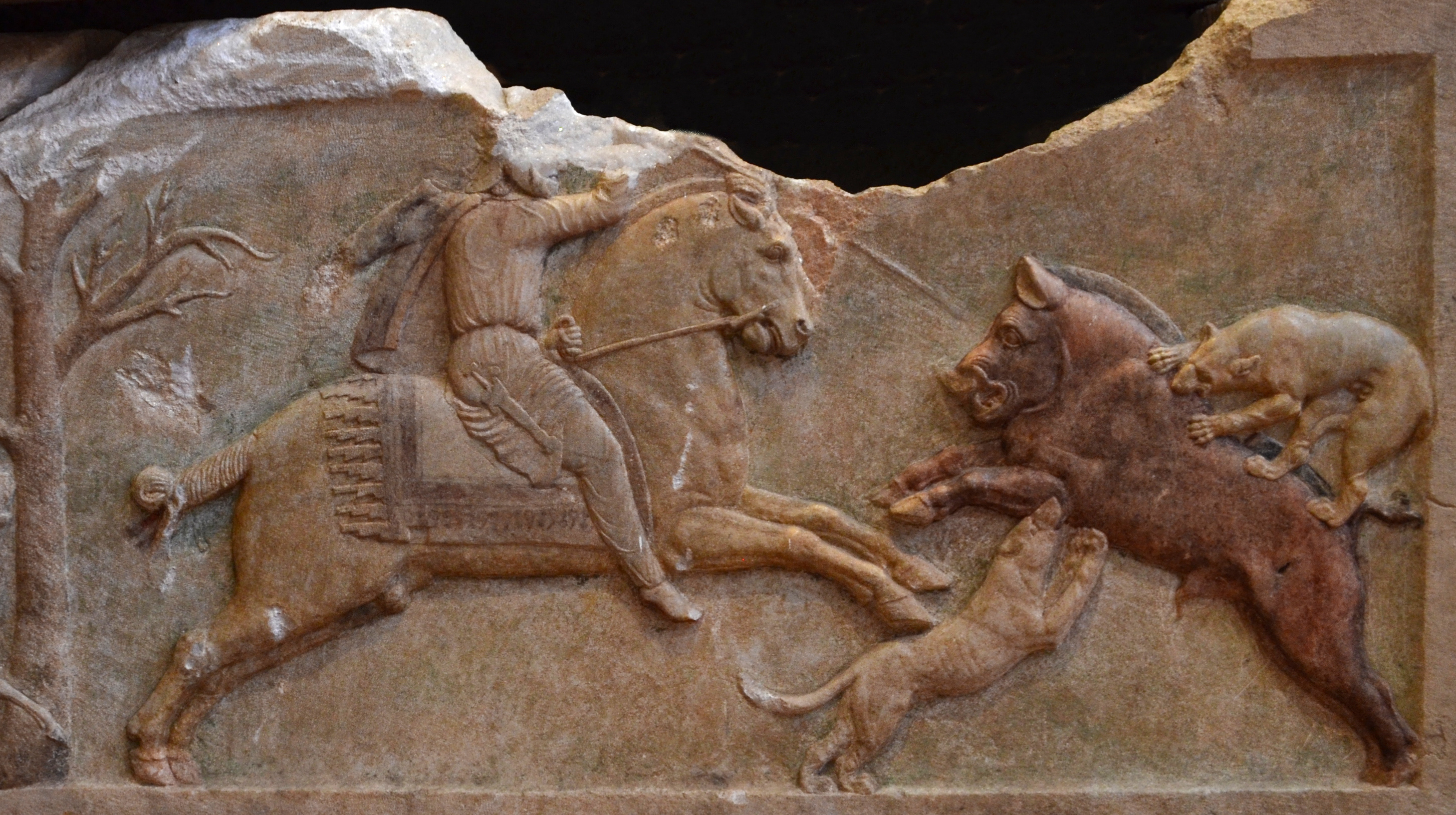
Boar hunting scene.

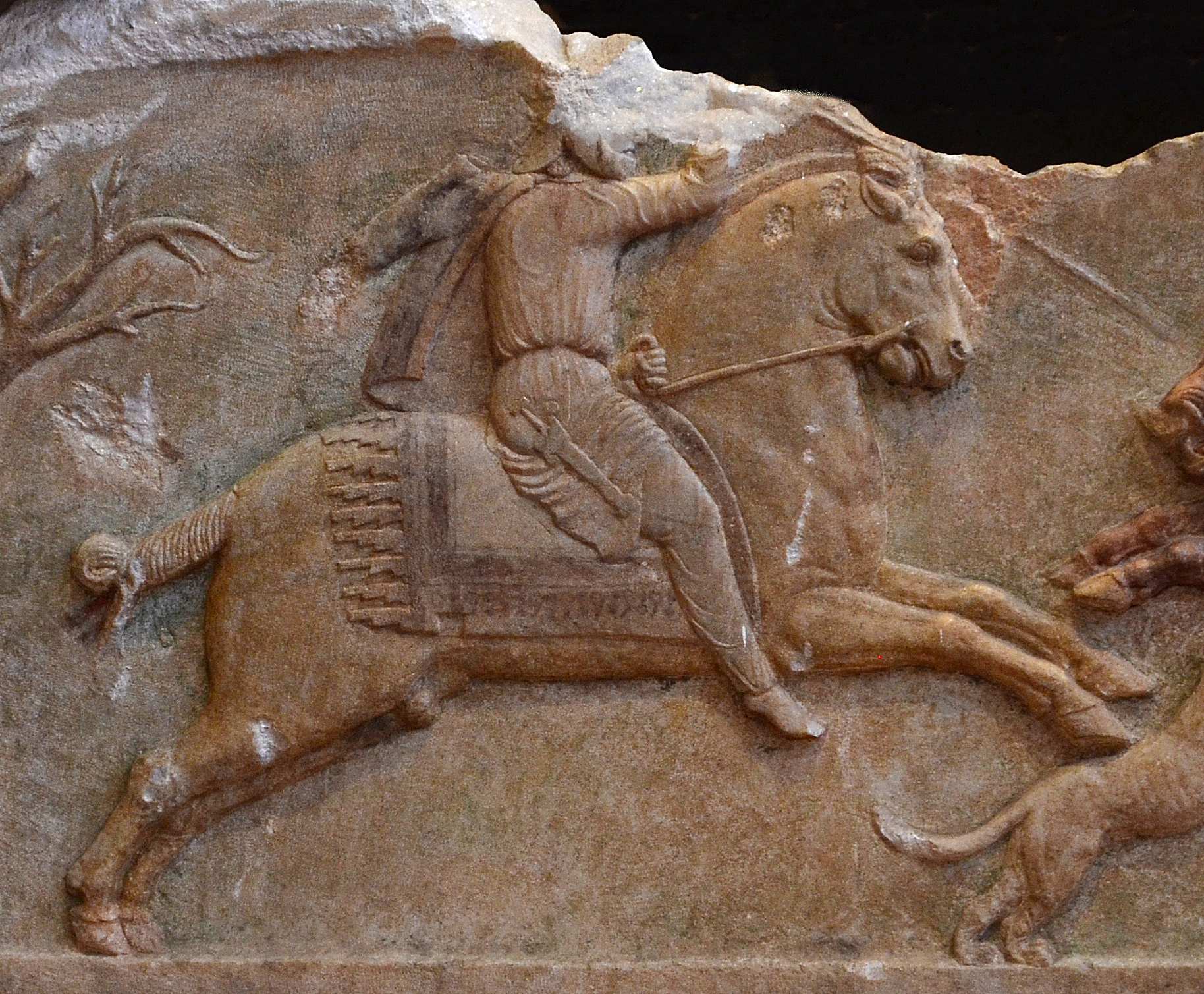
Boar hunting scene (hunter detail).

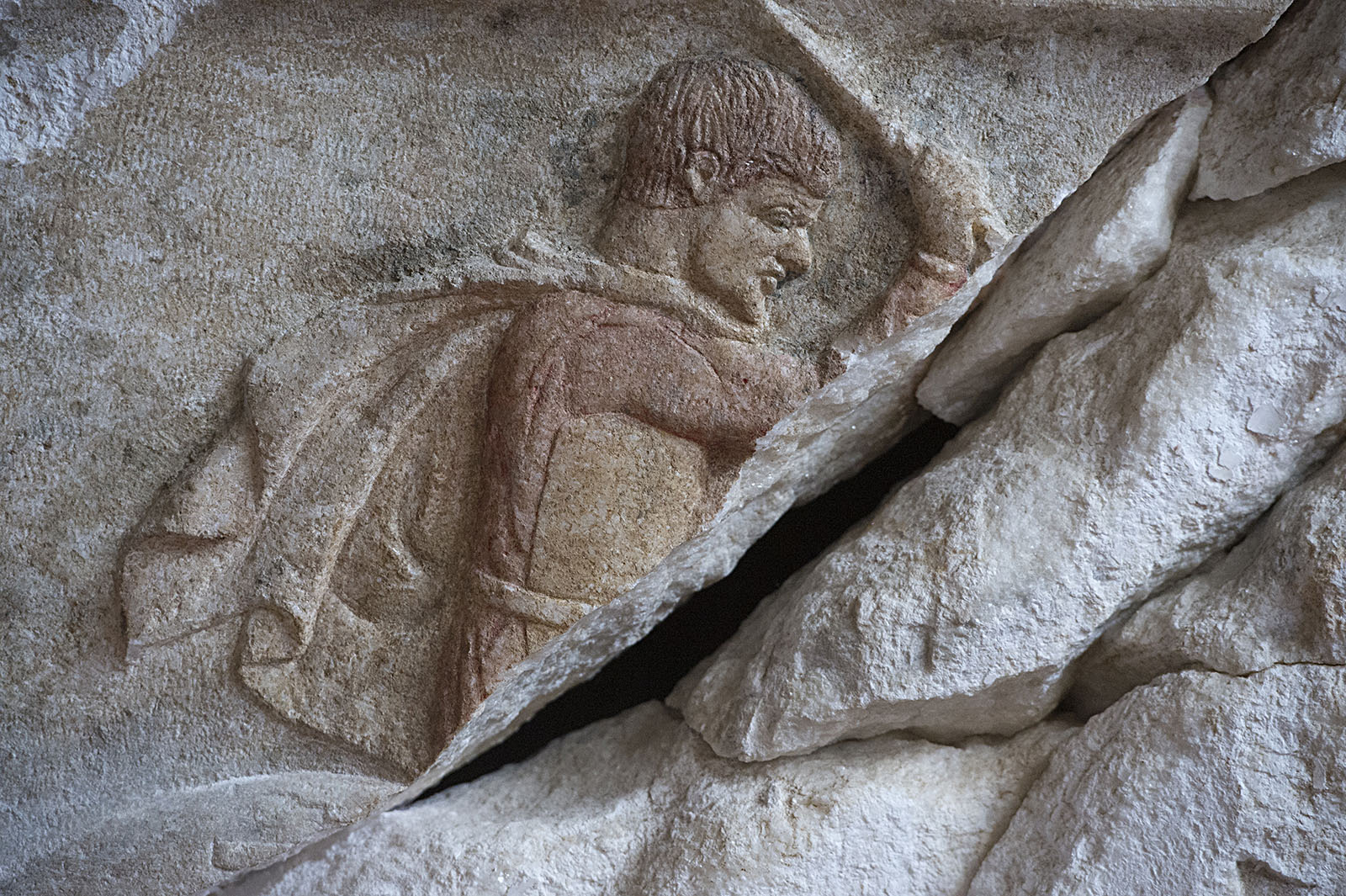
Altıkulaç Sarcophagus Now in Troy Museum

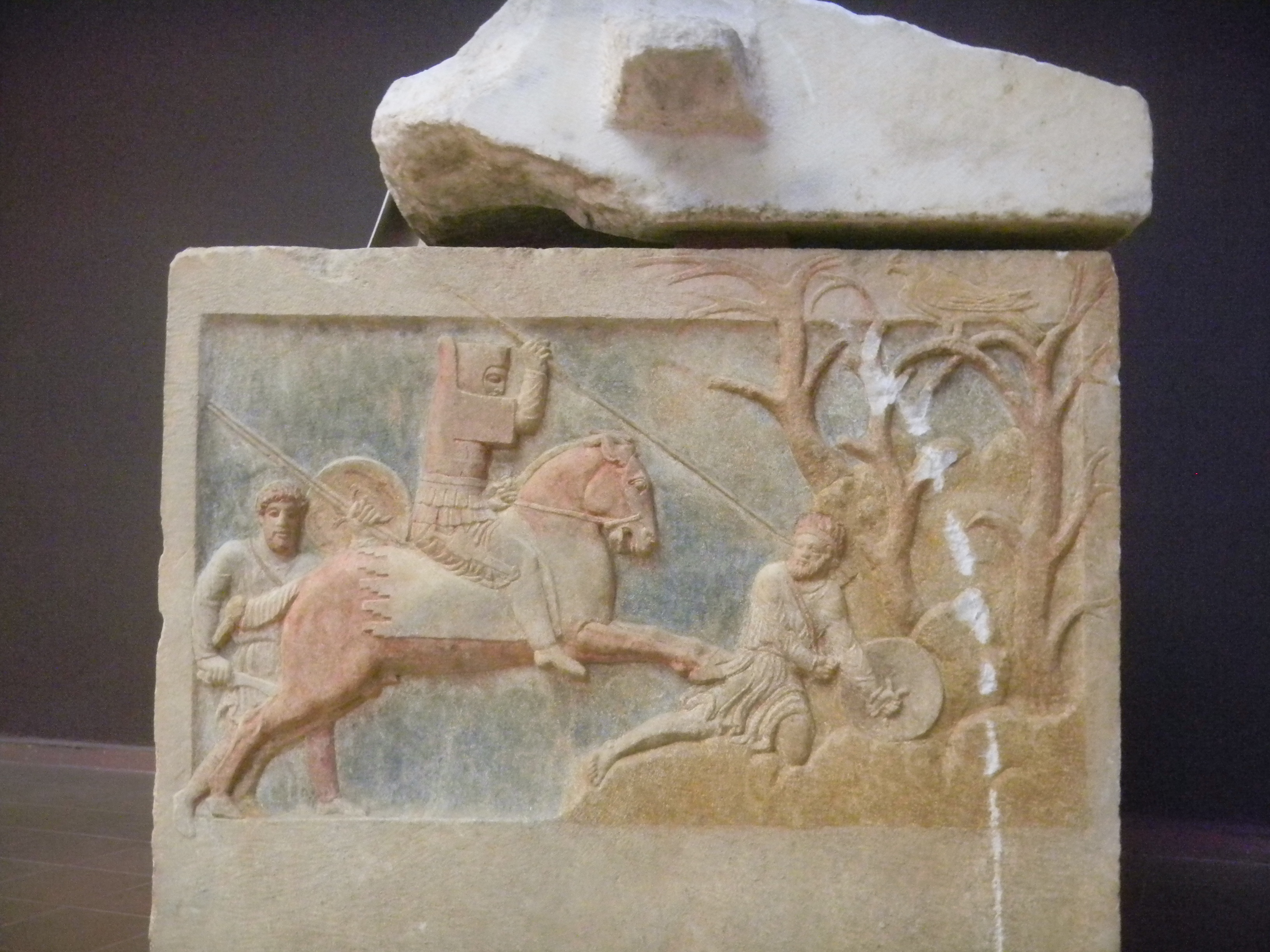
Battle scene.

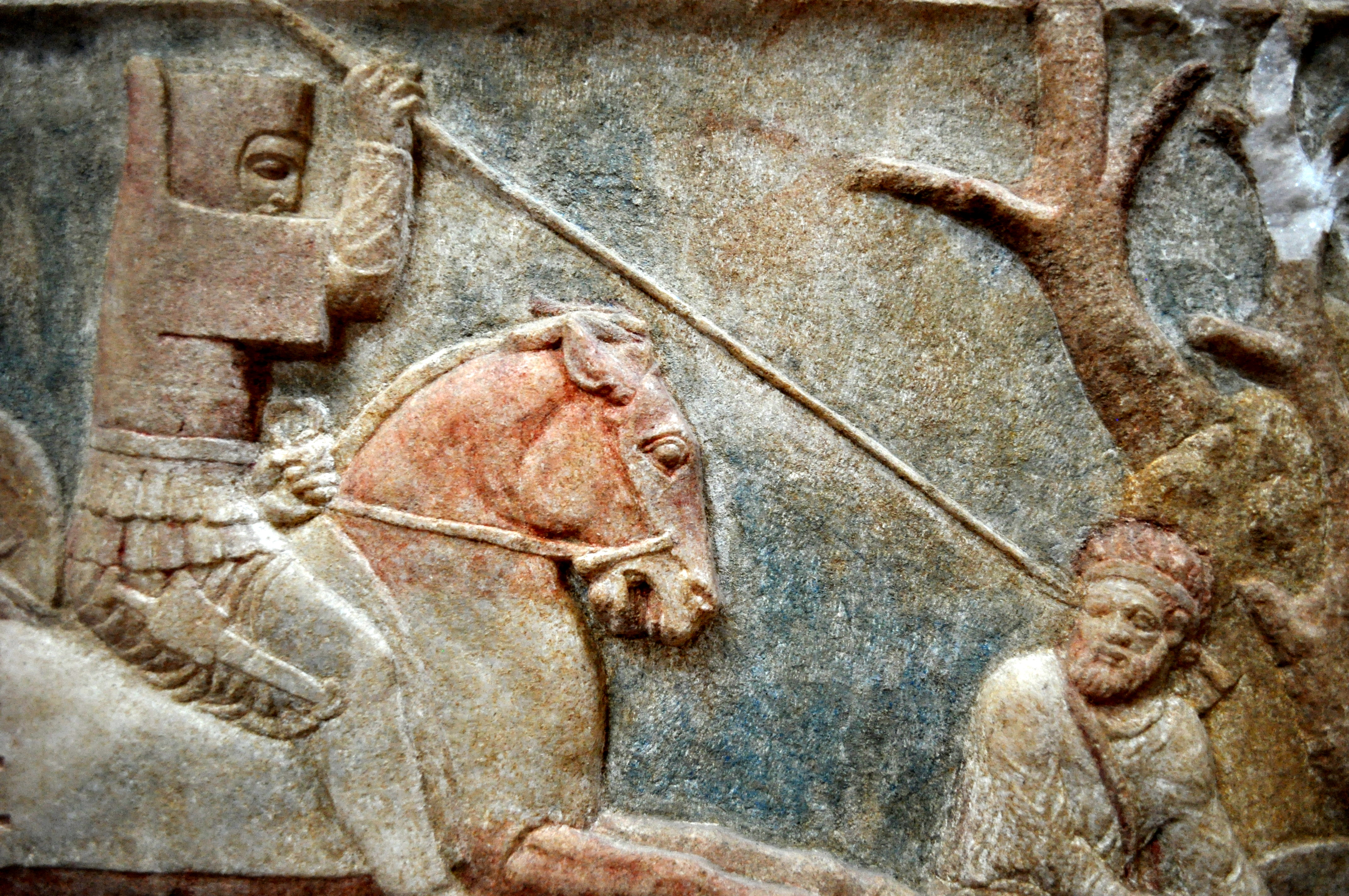
Battle scene (detail).

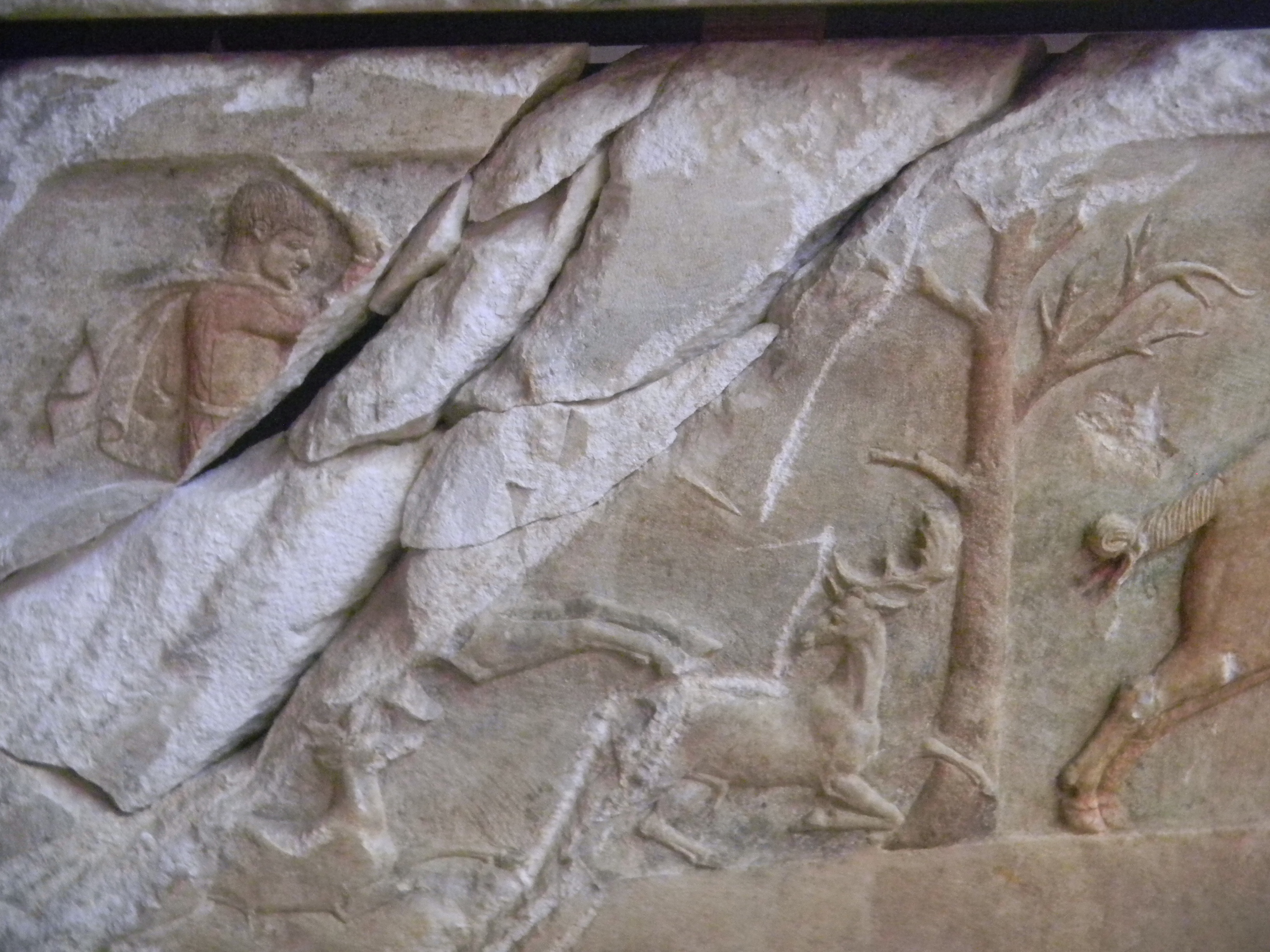
Buck hunting scene (detail).

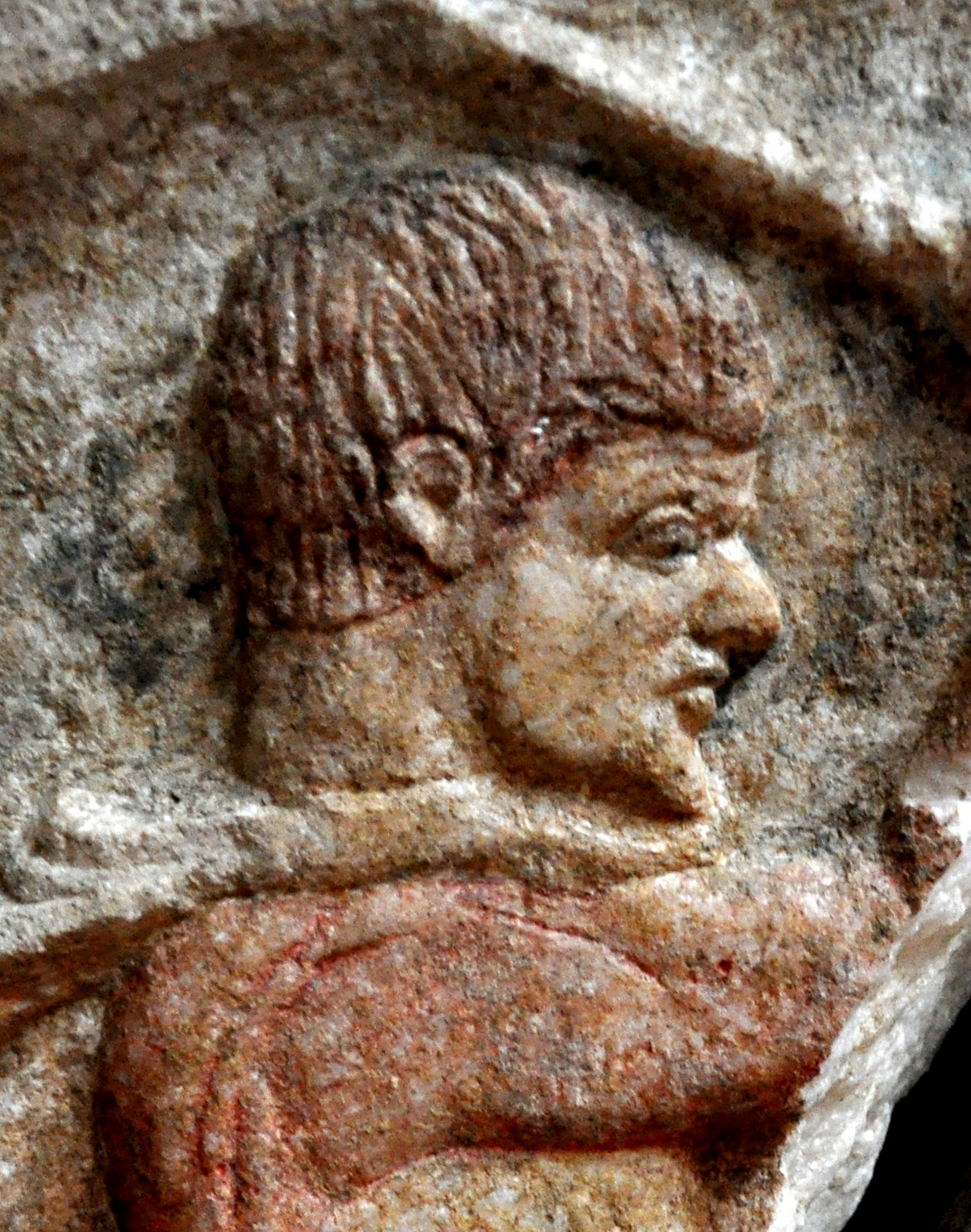
Profile of one of the hunters (Buck hunting scene).

== See also ==
- Polyxena sarcophagus
