= Polyxena sarcophagus =

6th century BCE sarcophagus from Hellespontine Phrygia

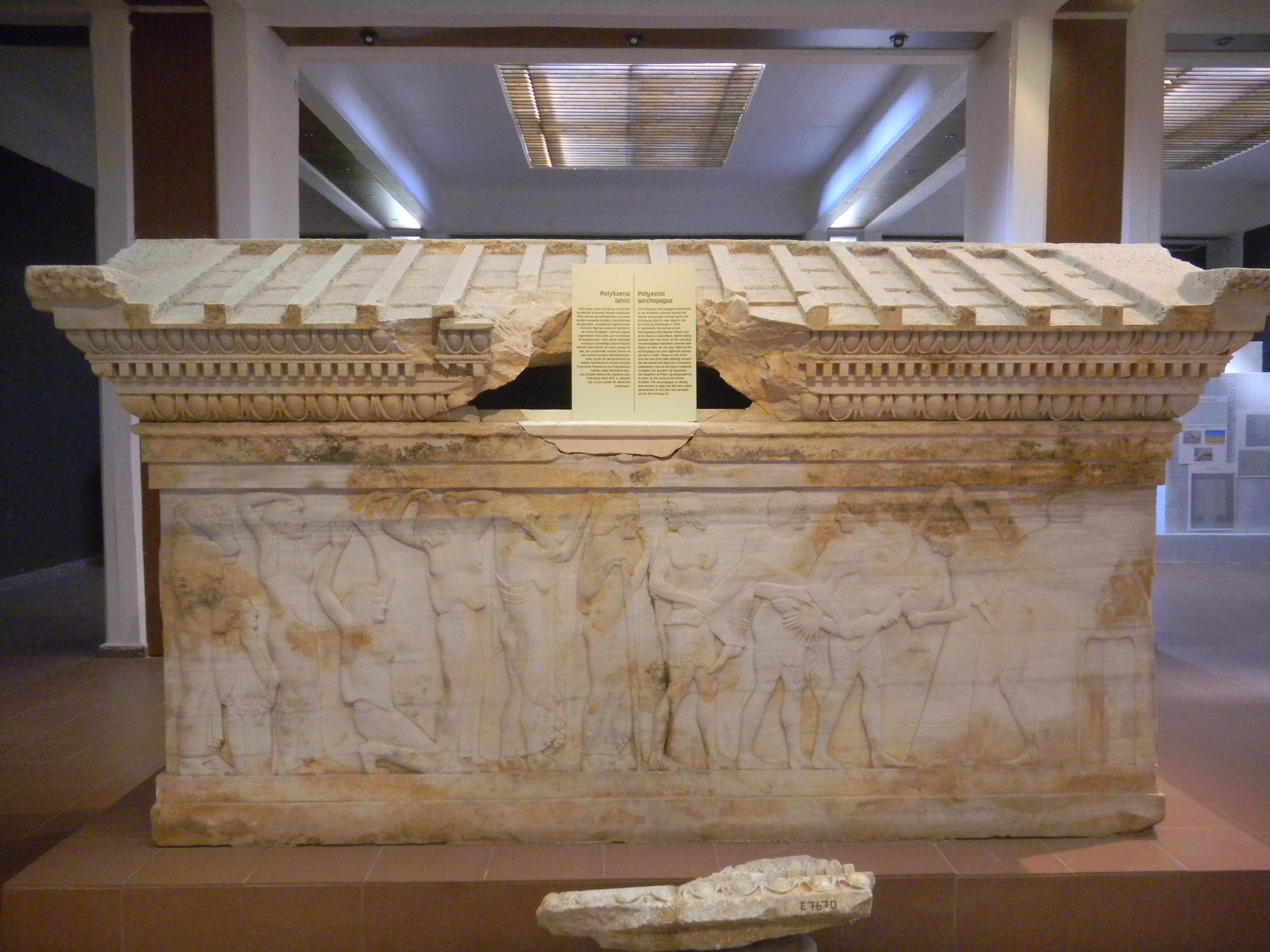
- Relief of the sacrifice of Polyxena, Polyxena sarcophagus, Çanakkale Archaeological Museum.
- Material: Marble
- Created: 520–500 BCE
- Present location: Troy Museum, Turkey

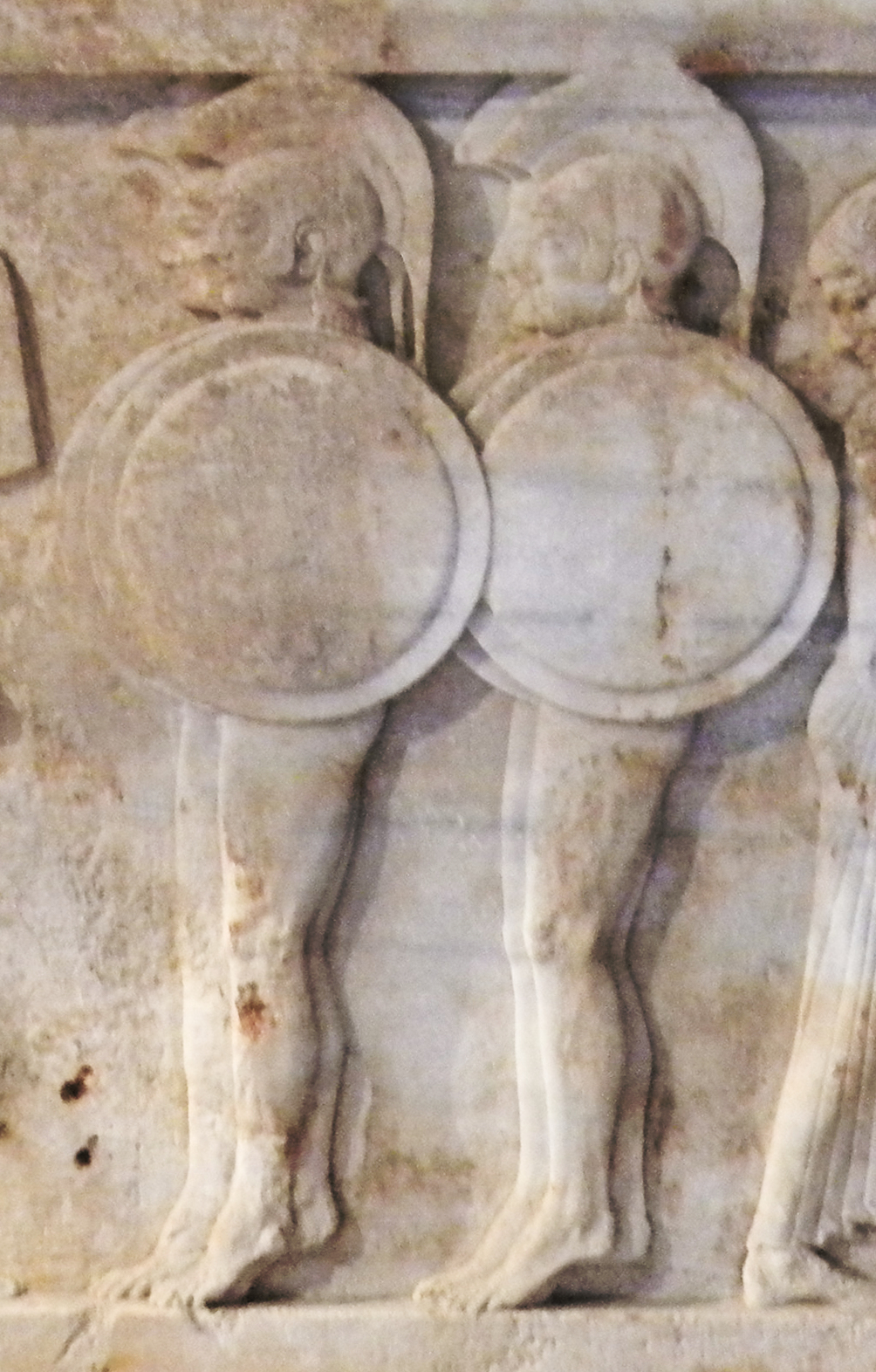
Hoplites on the Polyxena sarcophagus

The Polyxena sarcophagus is a late 6th century BCE sarcophagus from Hellespontine Phrygia, at the beginning of the period when it became a Province of the Achaemenid Empire. The sarcophagus was found in the Kızöldün tumulus, in the Granicus river valley, near Biga in the Province of Çanakkale in 1994. The area where the sarcophagus was found is located midway between Troy and Daskyleion, the capital of Hellespontine Phrygia.

This is the earliest stone sarcophagus with figural reliefs ever found in Asia Minor. The style is Late Archaic Greek and the sarcophagus dates to the last two decades of the 6th century BCE (520–500 BCE), or slightly later (500–490 BCE), based on stylistic analysis.

The reliefs represent a funerary celebration on three of its sides, and on the back what is believed to be the sacrifice of Polyxena, daughter of the king of Troy, Priam, by Neoptolemos in front of the tomb of his father Achilles.

The description of the sacrifice of Polyxena may be suggestive of a hero cult for Achilles, usually only involving animal sacrifice, on the spot of a Troad tumulus where he may have been buried. Strabo (13.1.32) suggested that such a cult of Achilles existed in Troad:

Near the Sigeium is a temple and monument of Achilles, and monuments also of Patroclus and Antilochus. The Ilienses perform sacred ceremonies in honour of them all, and even of Ajax. But they do not worship Hercules, alleging as a reason that he ravaged their country.

— Strabo (13.1.32).

The men shown in the reliefs are Greek, while the women are Trojans.

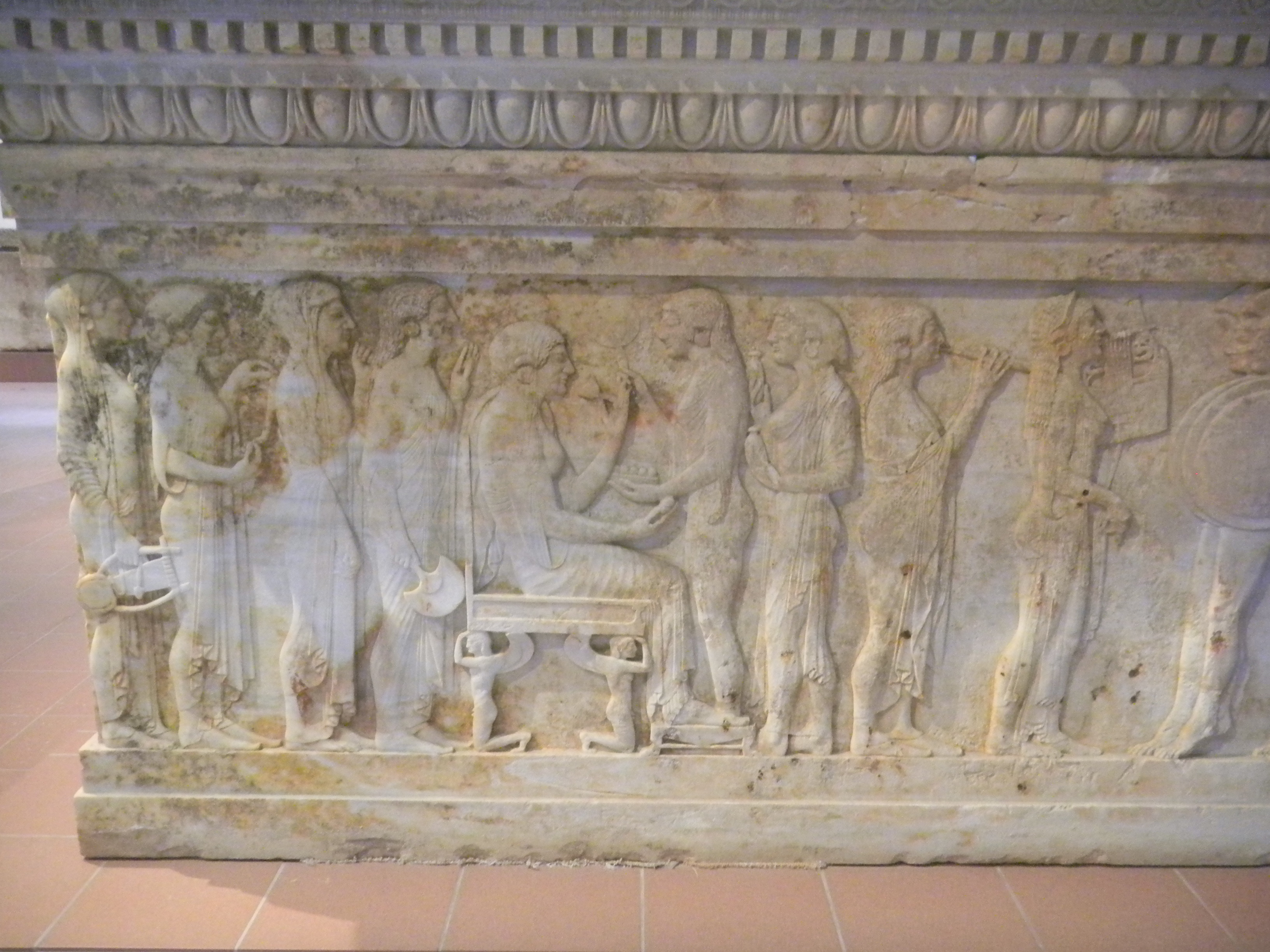
Side view.

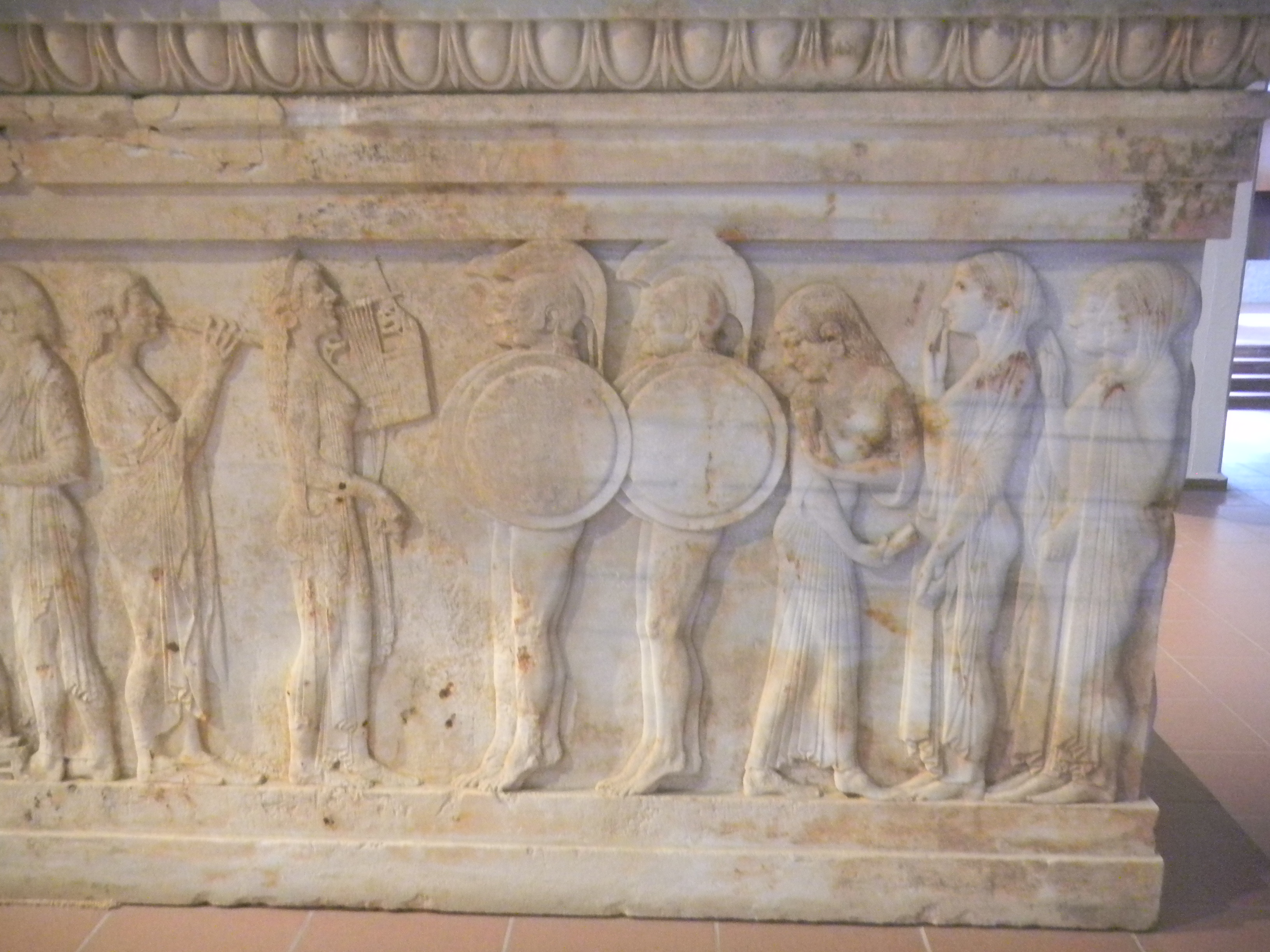
Side view.

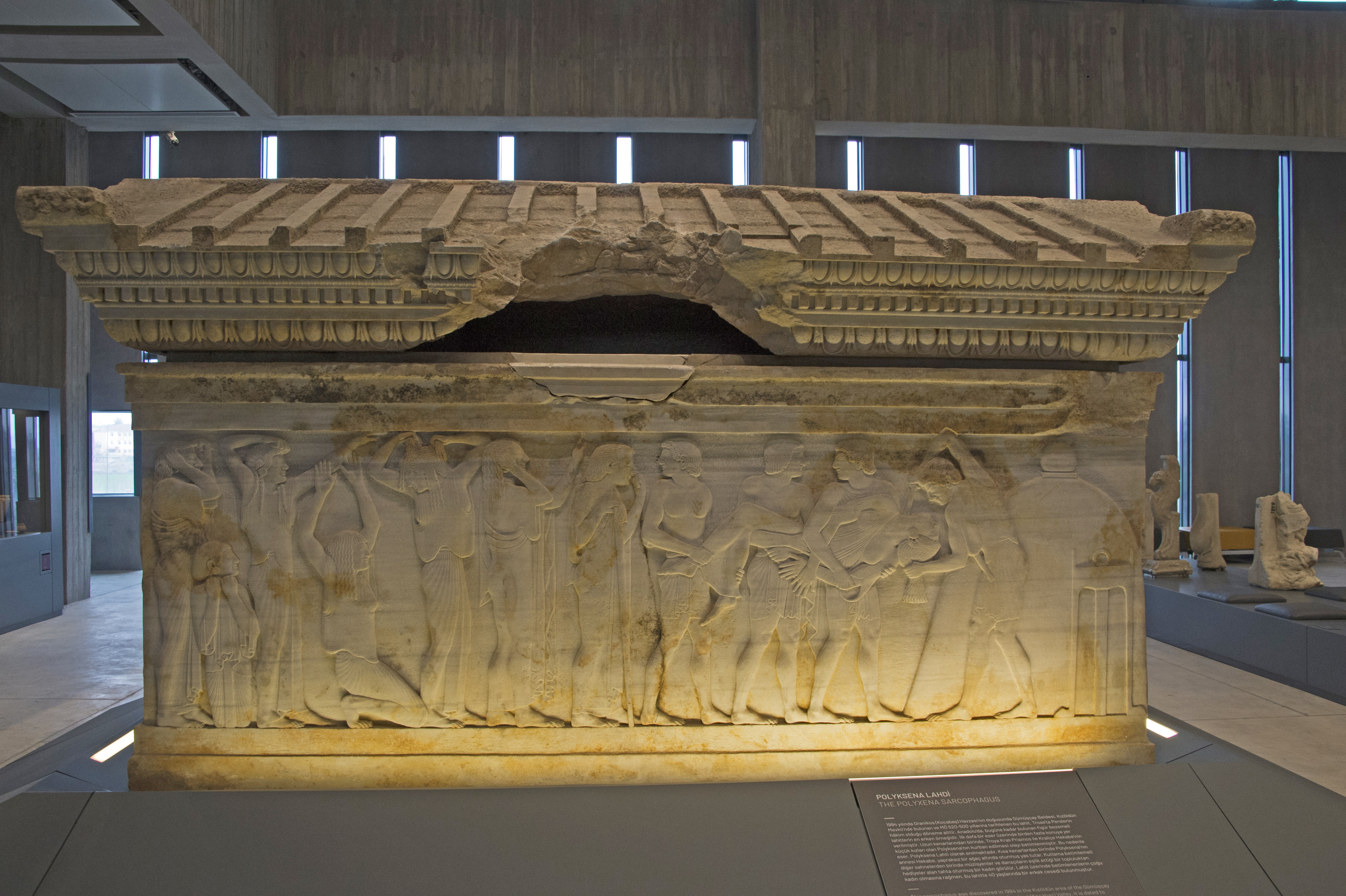
The sacrifice of Polyxena on the eponymous sarcophagus

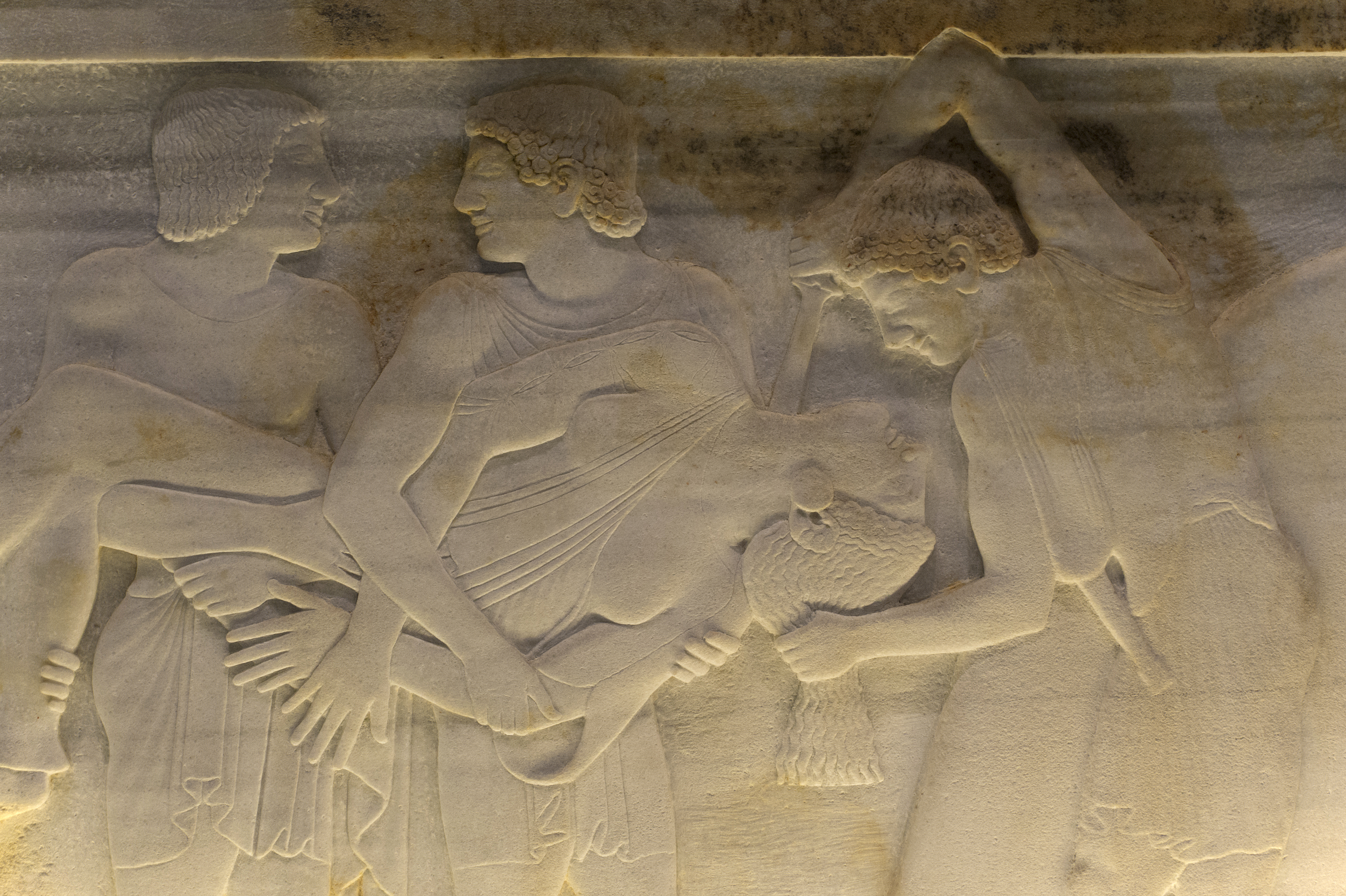
The sacrifice of Polyxena on the eponymous sarcophagus (detail).

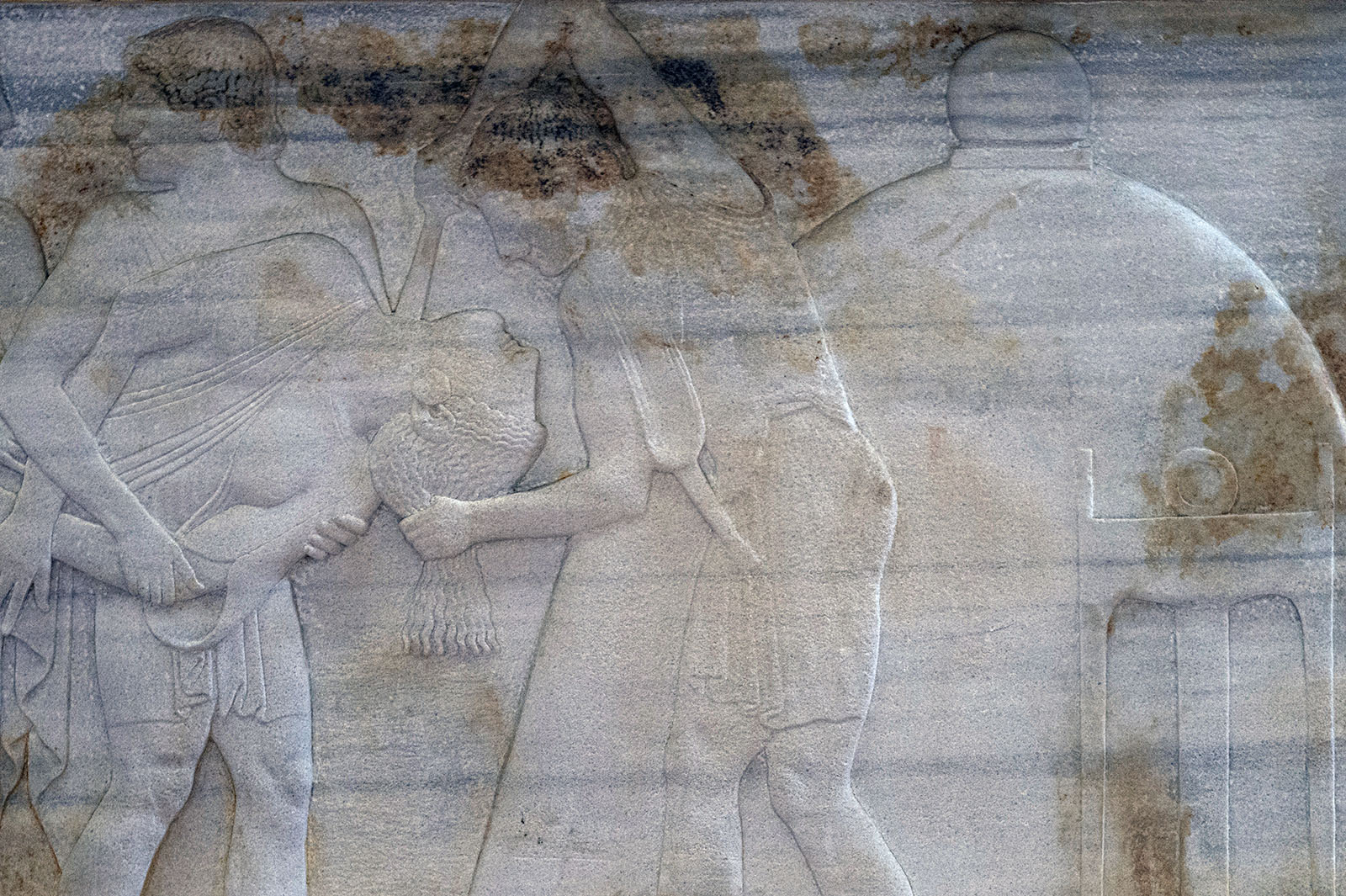
The sacrifice of Polyxena and tomb of Achilles.

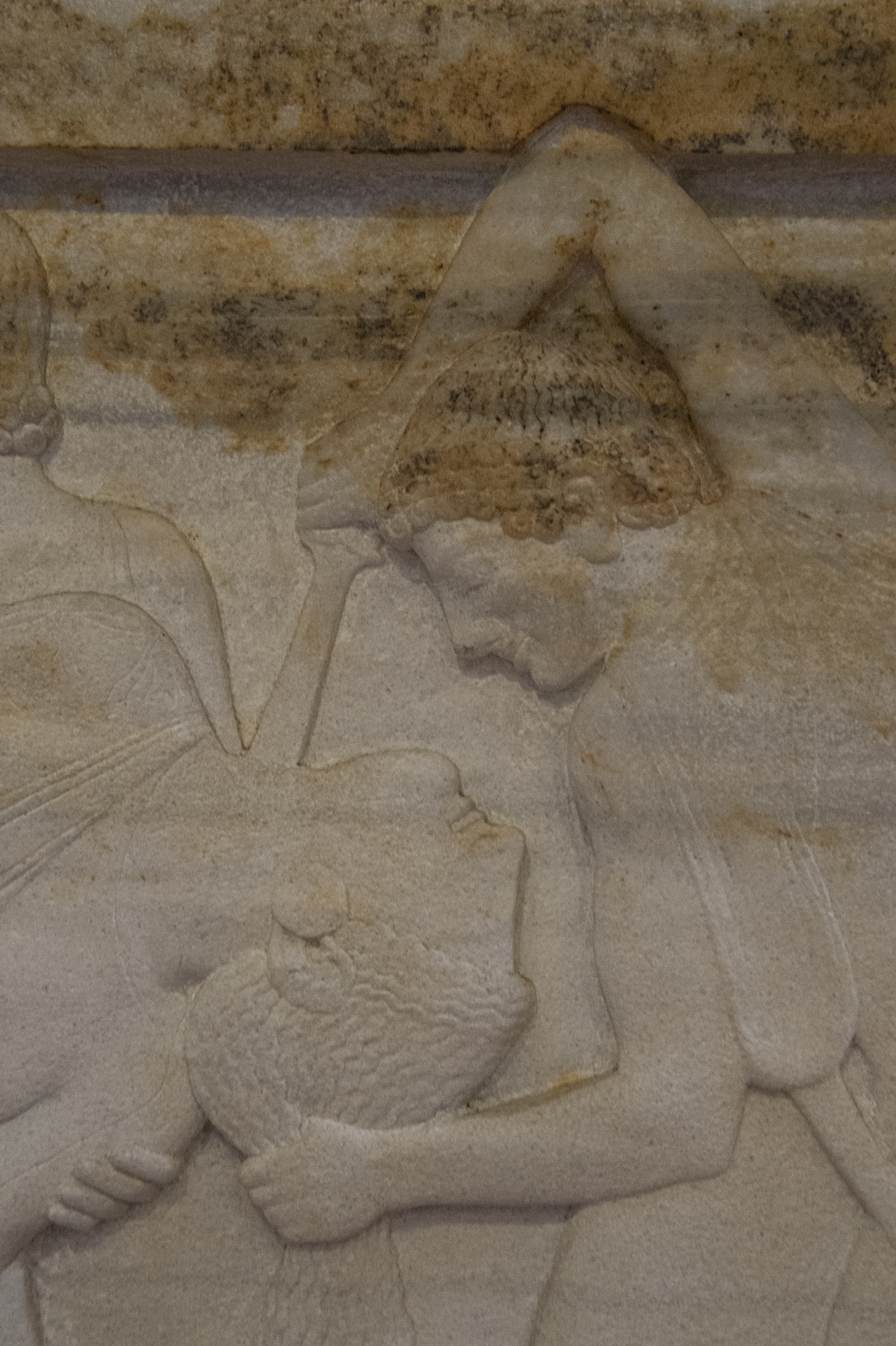
Sacrifice of Polyxena and tomb of Achilles with a tripod in front.

== See also ==
- Altıkulaç Sarcophagus
