= Çanakkale Archaeological Museum =

Museum in Çanakkale, Turkey

- Çanakkale Arkeoloji Müzesi
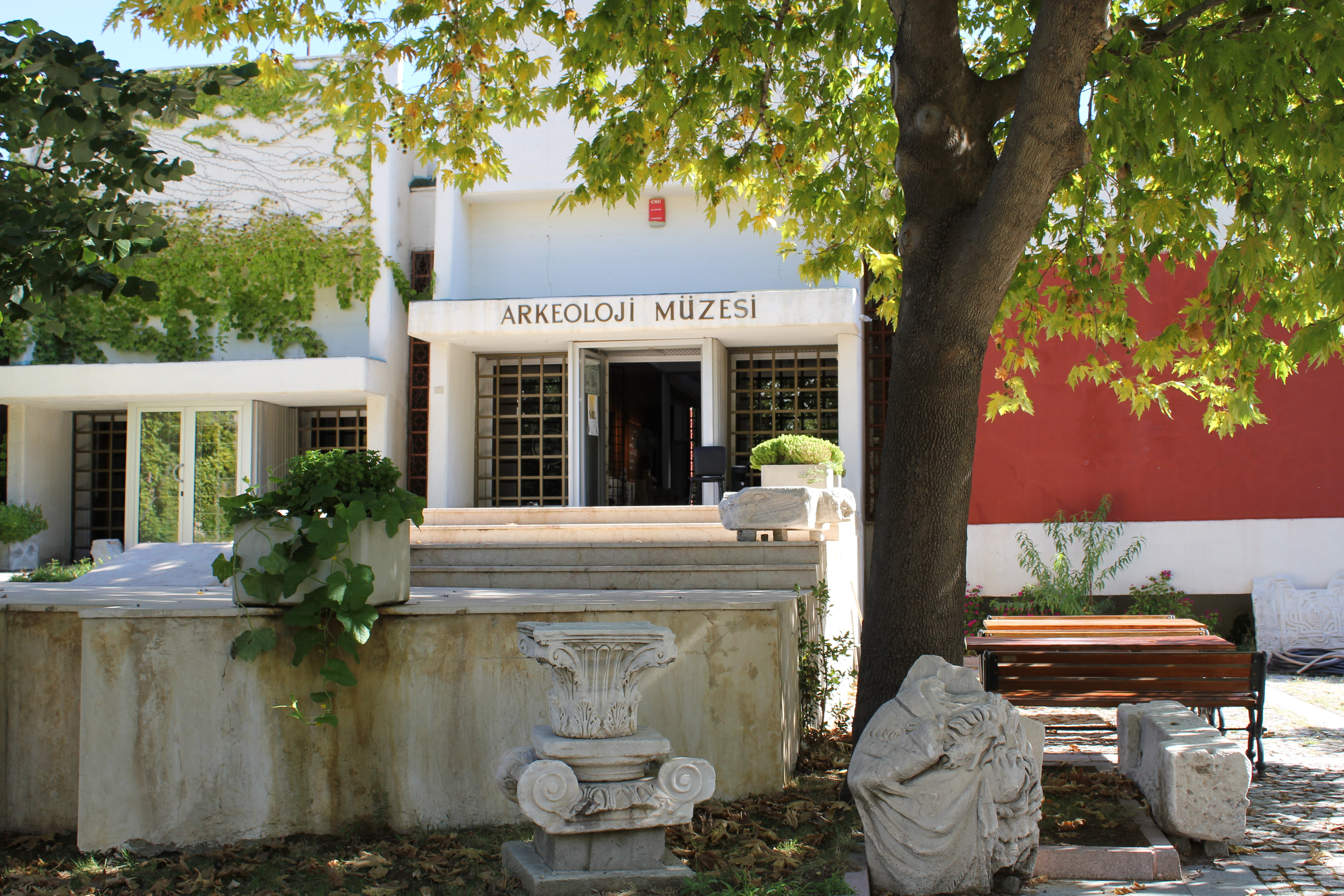
- Entrance of the museum

- Location of Çanakkale Archaeological Museum in Turkey
- Established: 1984; 42 years ago
- Location: 100.yıl cad., Çanakkale, Turkey
- Coordinates: 40°07′59″N 26°24′35″E
- Type: Archaeology
- Collection size: 12747 archaeologic, 15237 coins 2714 ethnographic
- Owner: Ministry of Culture and Tourism

Çanakkale Archaeological Museum (Turkish: Çanakkale Arkeoloji Müzesi) was a museum in Çanakkale, Turkey. Its contents have been moved to the 2018-established Troy Museum (Turkish: Troya Müzesi or Truva Müzesi), close to the excavation site of the ancient Greek city of Troy. The museum site is now home to the Mehmet Akif Ersoy Provincial Public Library.

Çanakkale was situated on the Anatolian side of the Dardanelles Strait. It is close to famous Troy of the antiquity. The Dardanelles campaign of World War I is known as Çanakkale Savaşı in Turkish.

In 1960, an abandoned church was opened as a museum. In 1984, the museum moved to 100. yıl street of the city at 40°07′59″N 26°24′35″E.

The following text was found to be correct for the Troy Museum: The main items in the exhibition halls are artifacts from various ruins around Çanakkele such as a Troia, Assos, Apollon, Smintheion, Tenedos and Alexandria Troas. Some of the items are marble sculptures, steles, illumination gadgets, terracota and bronze kitchenware, glassware and ornaments. A colored sarcophagus from the Achaemenid Empire and Polyxena sarcophagus are among the notable items.

== See also ==
- Troy Museum

== Gallery ==
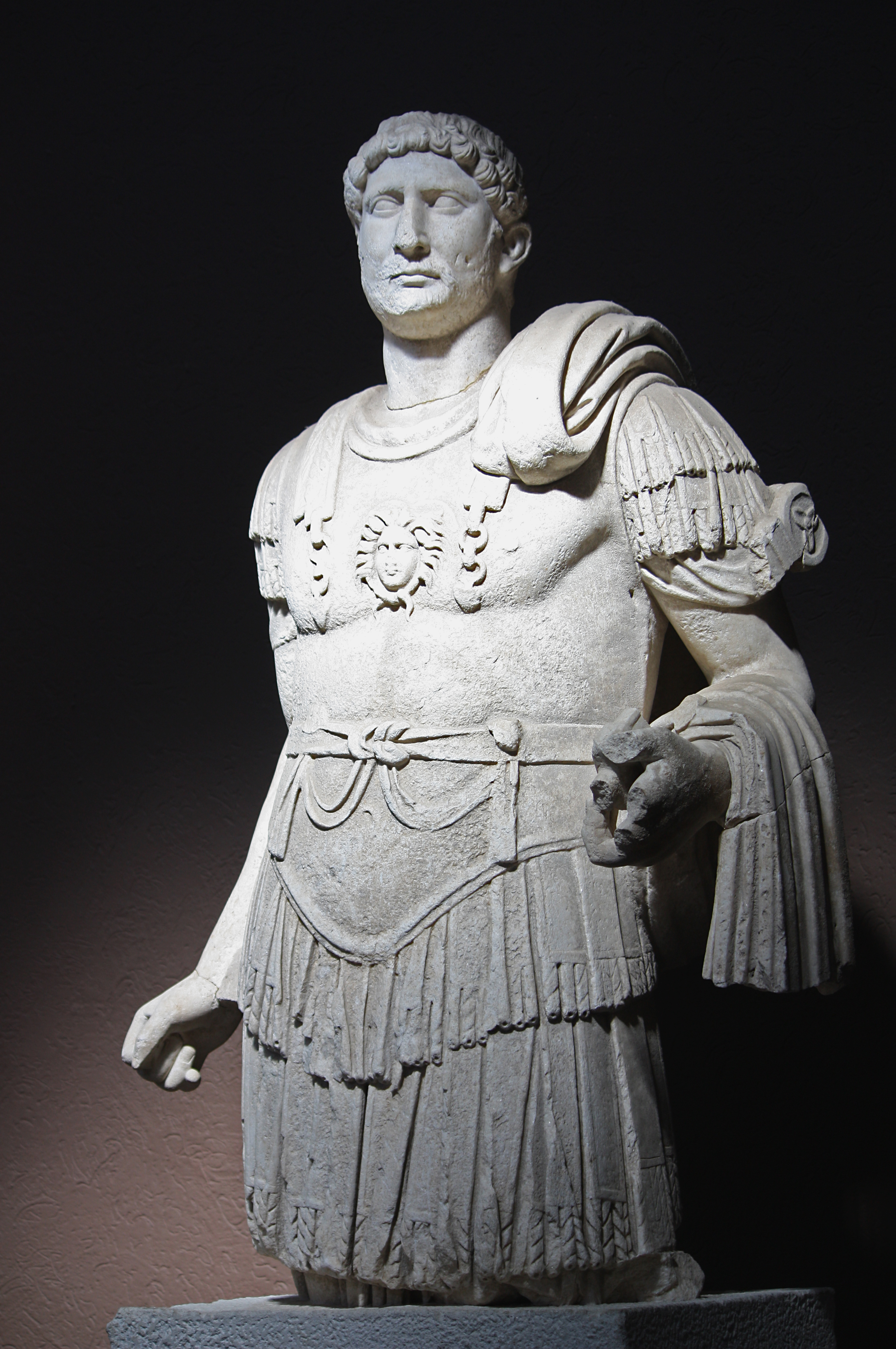
Statue of Hadrian

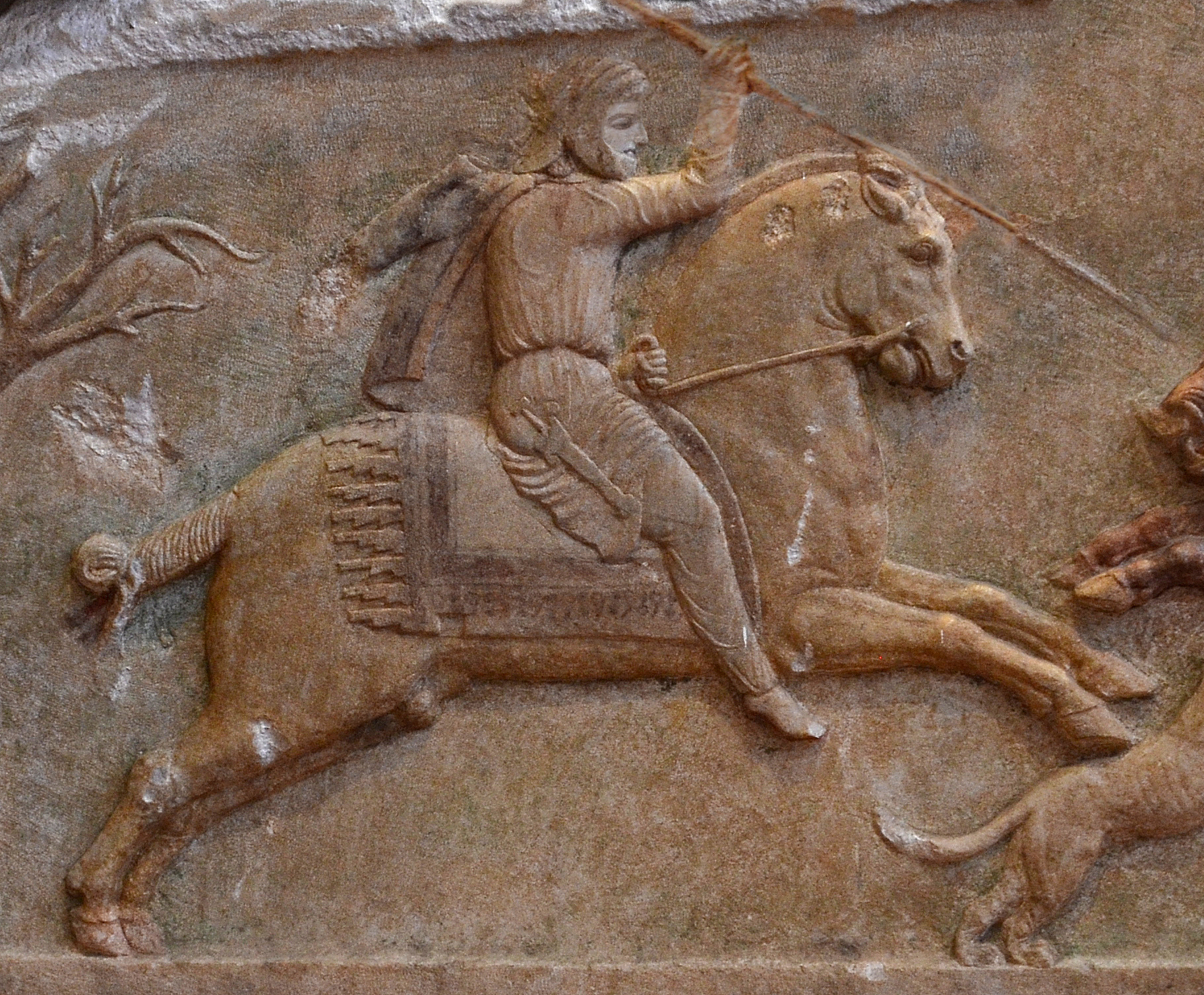
Altıkulaç Sarcophagus, early 4th century BCE.

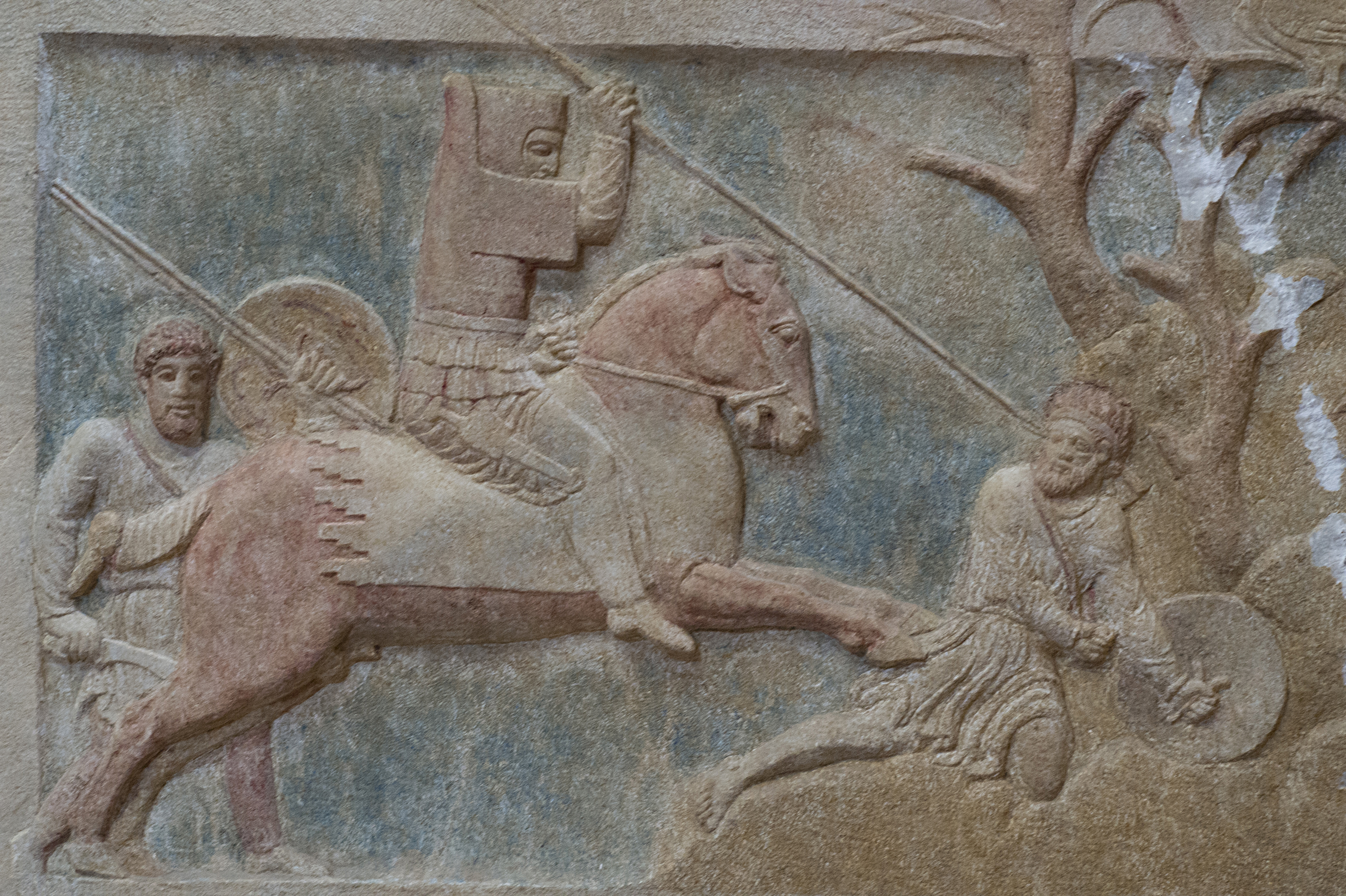
Altıkulaç Sarcophagus, early 4th century BCE.

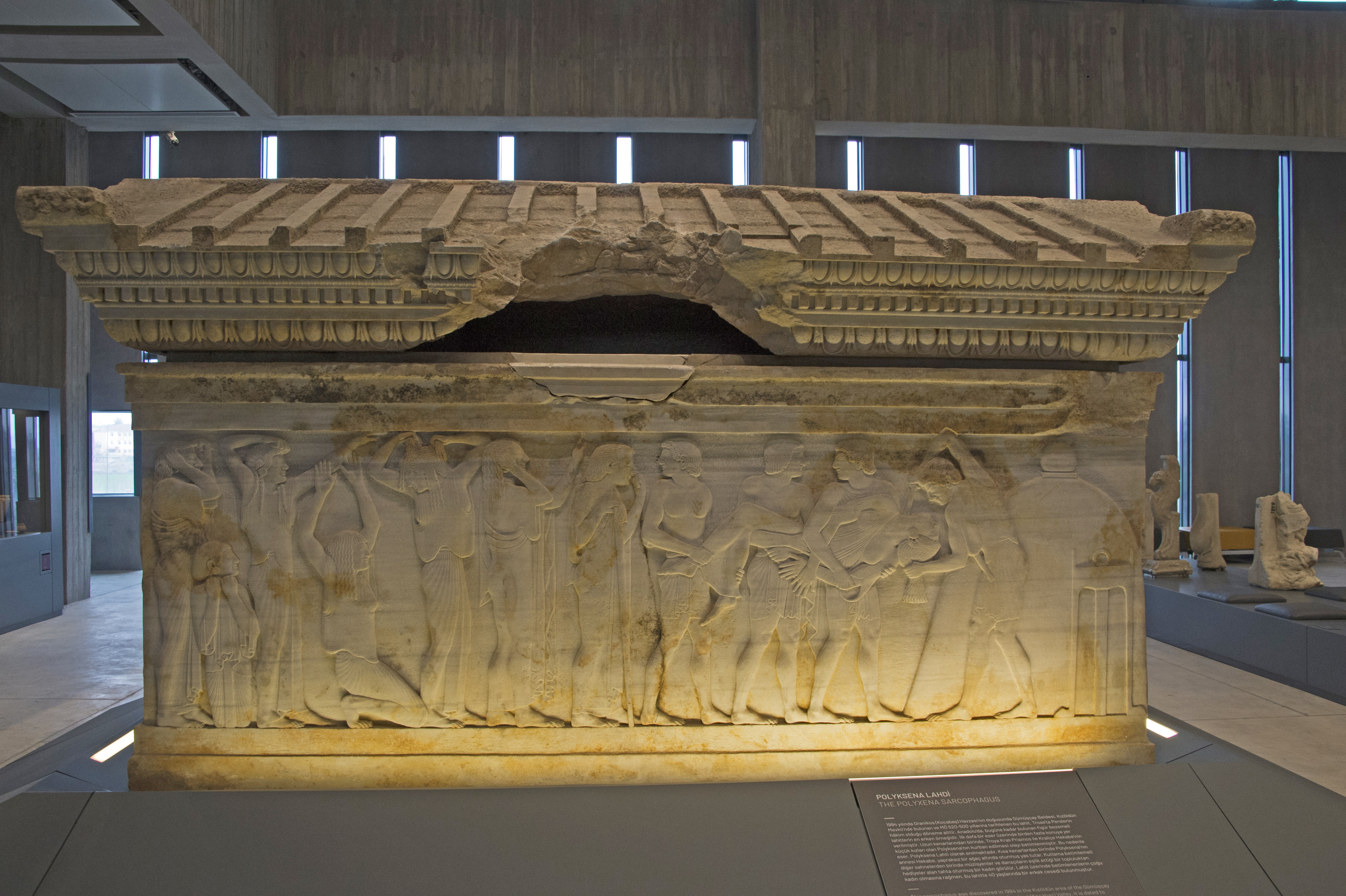
Polyxena Sarcophagus

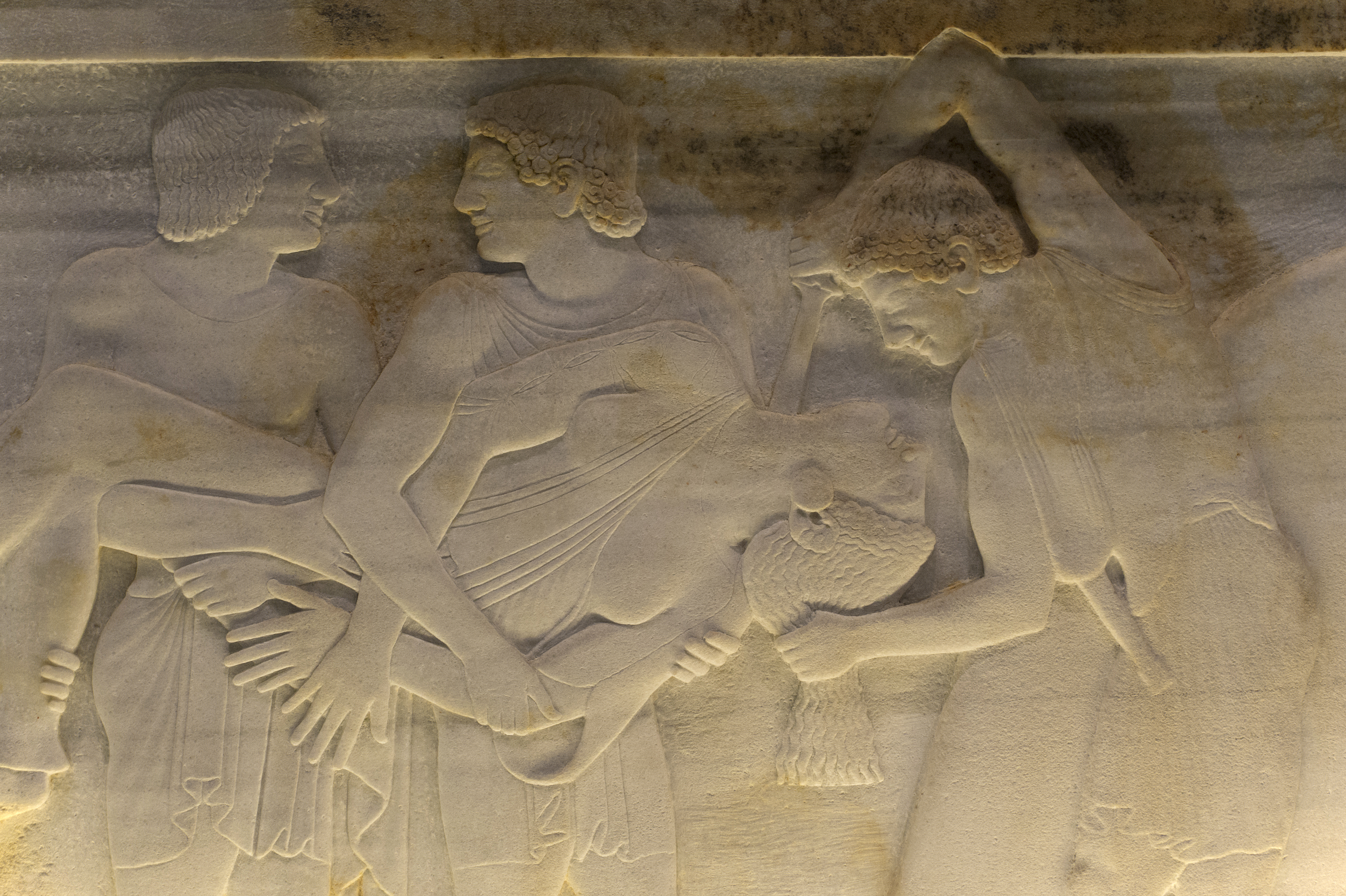
Polyxena Sarcophagus

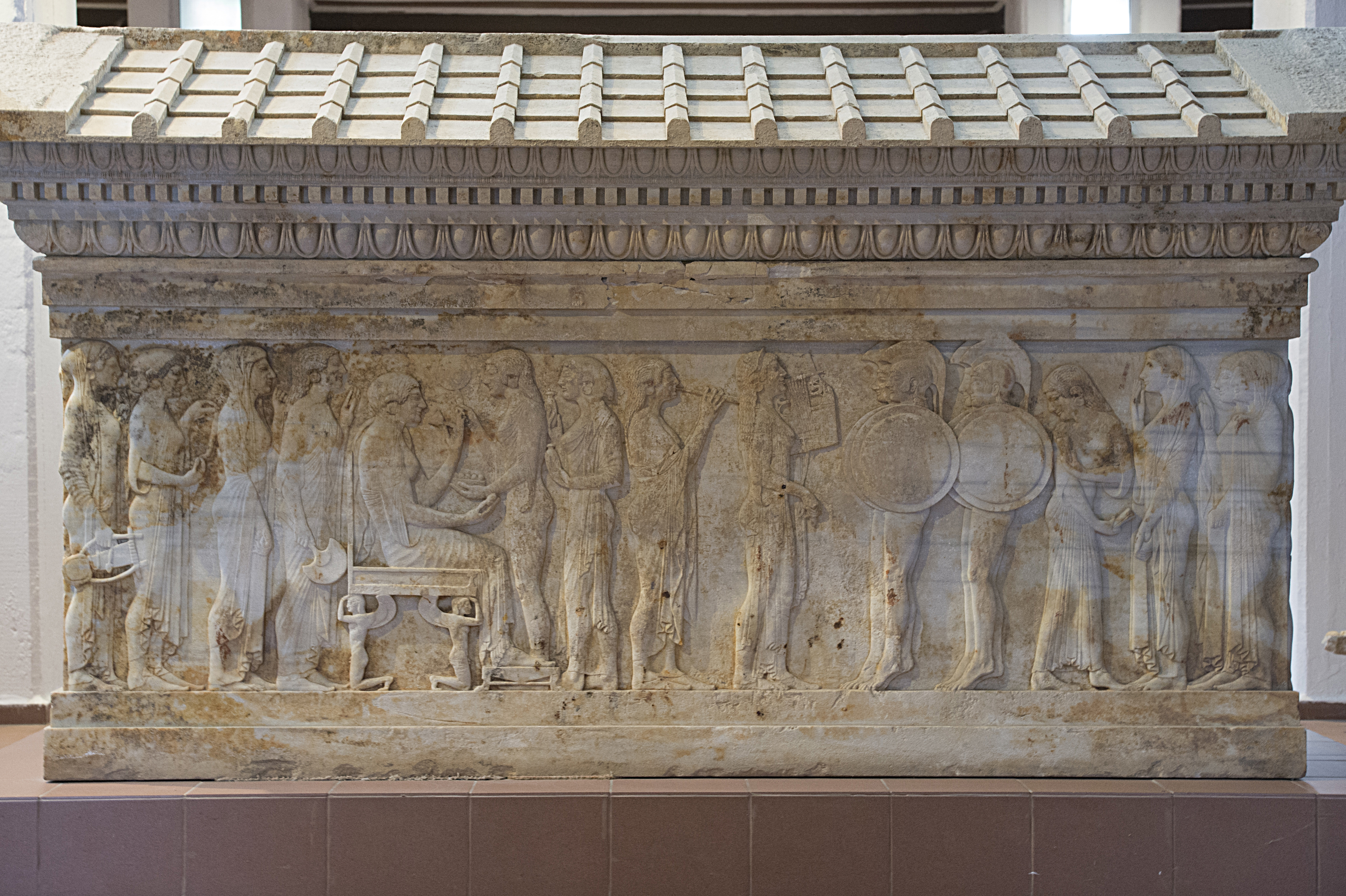
Polyxena Sarcophagus

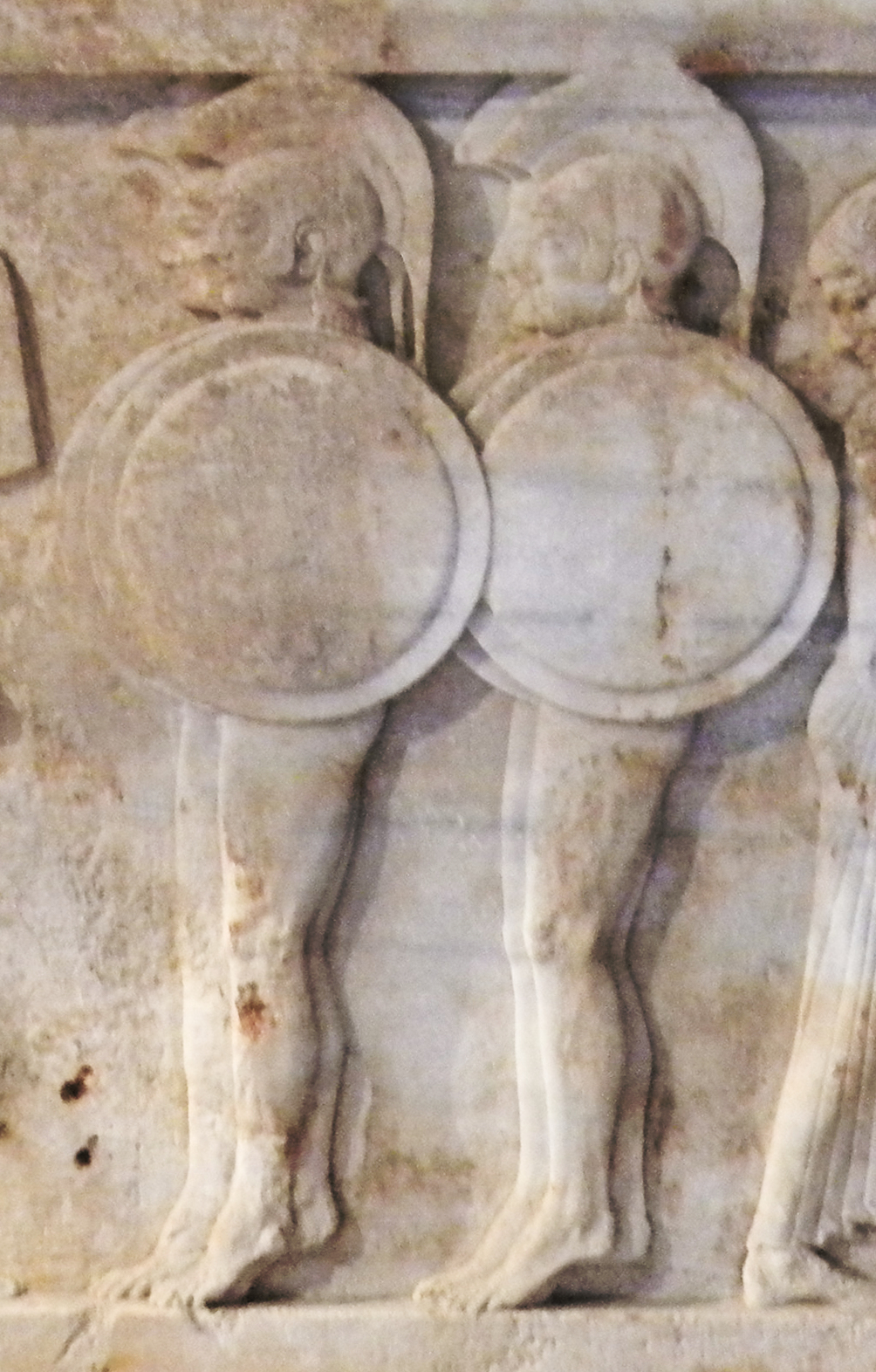
Polyxena Sarcophagus

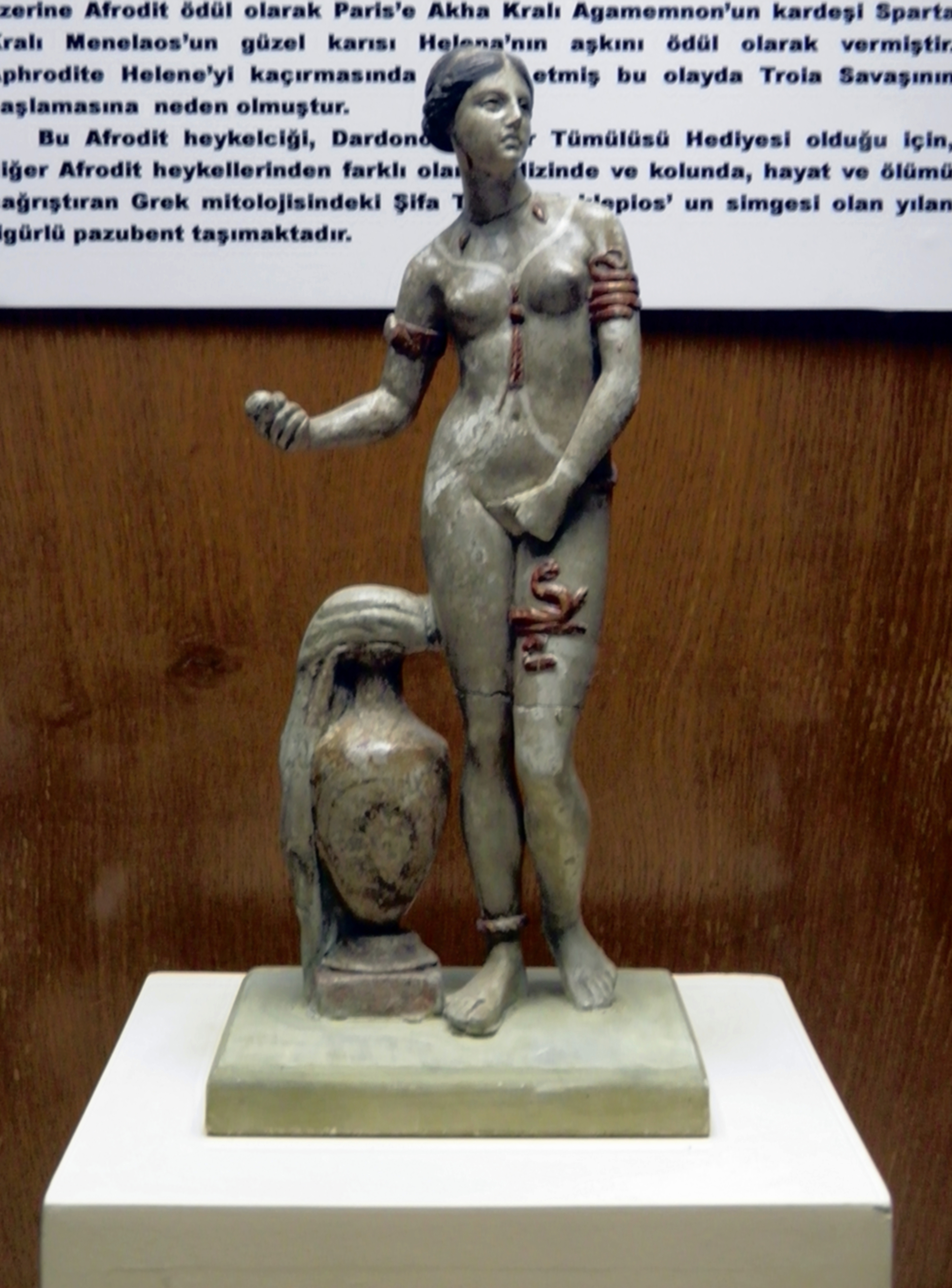
Statue of Aphrodite with snakes
