= Psiloi =

Ancient Greek light infantry

Macedonian battle formation with psiloi at the fore, courtesy of The Department of History, United States Military Academy.

In Ancient Greek armies, the psiloi (Ancient Greek ψιλοί, singular ψιλός, psilos, literally "bare, stripped") were light infantry who typically served as skirmishers and missile troops. They were distinguished from the armored hoplitai (heavy infantry) by their light weaponry and lack of armor.

In Classical Antiquity and Late Antiquity and throughout the existence of the Byzantine Empire, the lightest-armed troops, typically equipped with ranged weapons, and which fought irregularly in a loose formation, were deemed 'the psiloi'. Numbered among the psiloi were archers, the toxotai armed with a bow (toxa), and slingers, the (sphendonetai) who hurled stones or metal bullets with slings (sfendonai). Others, the akontistai, used the throwing javelin (akontia). Some psiloi simply threw stones at the enemy and were referred to as lithoboloi.

The psiloi were the least prestigious military class deployed by the ancient world. A member of the psiloi was normally a man or boy from the lower ranks of his society, unable to afford the shield and armor of the hoplites, let alone the horse ridden by the socially elite cavalryman, the hippeus (ἱππεύς). Another term for a member of the psiloi was gymnetes, (γυμνῆτες), "the lightly armed". Light infantry might also be called euzonoi ("active", "light armored"; a name shared with modern Evzones), though these might be any troops lightly armed, such as hoplitai deployed without their shields, who would not rank as psiloi. The peltastai (bearers of light shields, targeteers) were an intermediate infantry class, better armored than the psiloi but more lightly equipped than the hoplitai - the heavy infantry armed to fight at close quarters in the phalanx.

== Ancient Greece ==
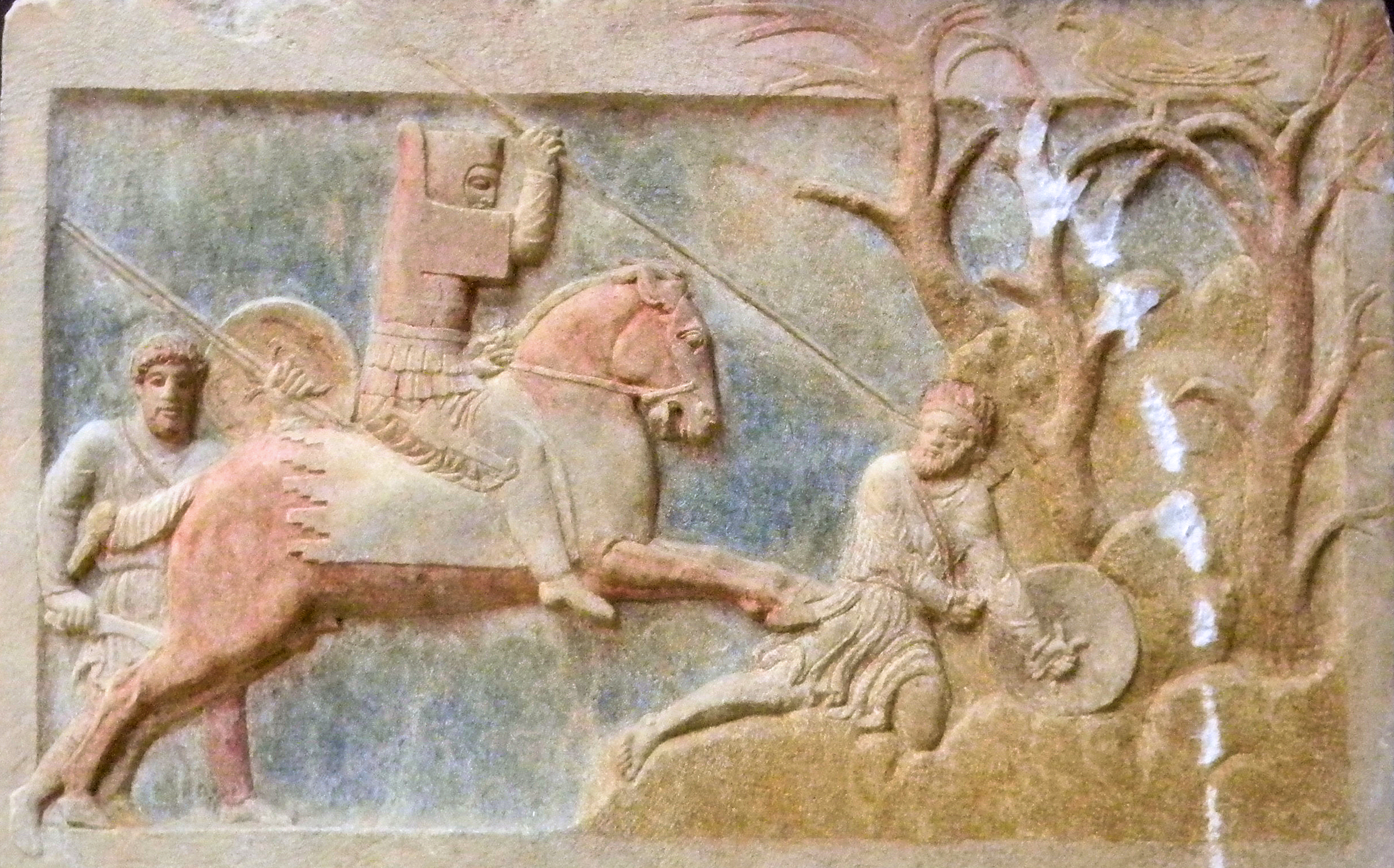
Armoured cavalry against psiloi: Achaemenid dynast of Hellespontine Phrygia attacking a Greek light infantryman, Altıkulaç Sarcophagus, early 4th century BCE.

In ancient Greece, the psiloi belonged to the poorest citizen classes; sometimes even unfree conscripts would be employed, such as the Peloponnesian helots. They were armed with a variety of missile weapons and might have a dagger or short sword.

The psiloi fought as skirmishers. Their task was to harass the enemy phalanx before the clash, to try to provoke disorder and protect their own lines from enemy skirmishers. They would be sent to occupy imposing terrain around and within the battlefield, as well as to disrupt the enemy in any way during his march, deployment or encampment. Just before the charge of the line, the psiloi would be recalled through the phalanx and deployed behind it or on its wings. They would avoid close combat with more heavily armed opponents unless they had the advantage of especially favorable terrain.

Psiloi could be used tactically, to constantly harass an enemy, unable to engage them. A famous engagement of psiloi against hoplitai was in the Battle of Sphacteria, in which the Athenian psiloi helped defeat a force of Spartan hoplitai, with powerful ramifications for the military reputation of the Spartans.

== Roman Empire ==
Grosphomachoi is the Greek term used by Polybius to describe the Roman Republic's youngest and lowest class of citizen soldiers in the Roman army, the velites. The grosphomachos – the Roman veles – was equipped with javelins Polybius calls grosphoi and which in Latin were termed veruta. These were short, light weapons whose long metal points were designed to bend to prevent re-use by the enemy once thrown. They were deployed as skirmishers in front of the heavier infantry of the legion. Velites were used against the Carthaginians' war elephants in the Punic Wars. Polybius describes the typical veles as having a helmet and parma, a small round shield.

Greek language military treatises of Late Antique and later Byzantine periods of the Roman Empire call all light troops psiloi, regardless of their defensive equipment. They were used as skirmishers, but they were often deployed in regular lines behind or among the heavy infantry ranks, usually equipped with bows.
