= Hybrias =

Hybrias (Greek: Ὑβρίας) (fl. 6th century BC) was a Cretan mercenary and lyric poet. He was the author of a highly esteemed skolion (drinking song) called the "Spear-song", which has been preserved by Athenaeus, Eustathius of Thessalonica, and the Analecta Veterum Poetarum Graecorum.

In this piece, Hybrias proclaimed himself a great warrior: "I have great wealth – a spear, a sword and a fine shield to save my skin. With these I plough, I reap, I tread the sweet grapes and am called master of my serfs. All those that dare not hold the spear and sword and fine shield to save their skin, all bow and kiss my knee, calling me master and great king".
