= Troy Museum =

Archaeological museum in northwestern Turkey

Museum of Troy
- Troya Müzesi

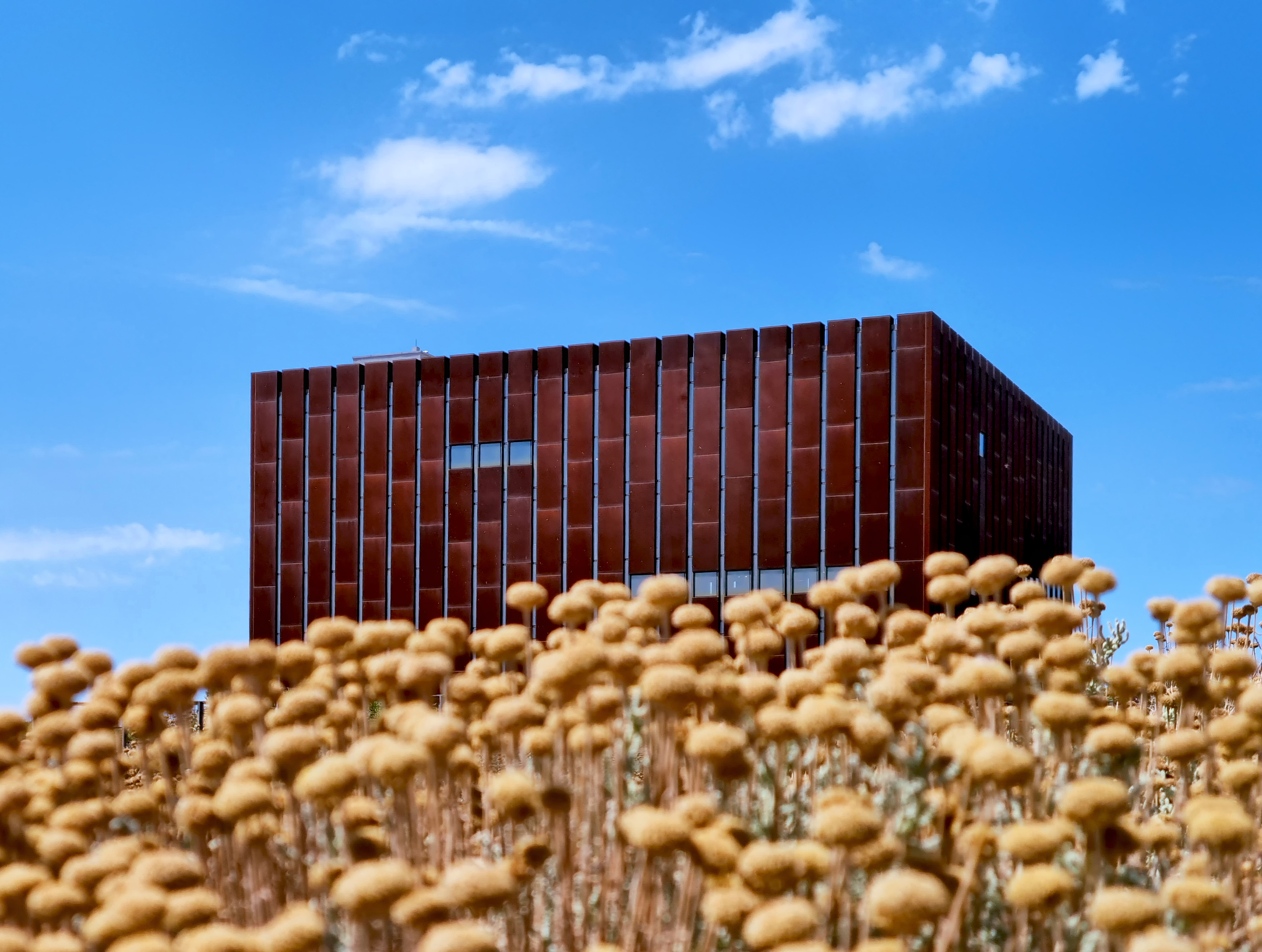

- Location of the museum in the Marmara Region
- Established: 10 October 2018; 7 years ago
- Location: Tevfikiye, Çanakkale Province, Turkey
- Coordinates: 39°57′19″N 26°14′57″E
- Type: Archaeological
- Collection size: more than 40,000 (2,000 on display)
- Executive director: Rıdvan Gölcük

The Museum of Troy (Turkish: Troya Müzesi) is an archaeological museum located close to the archaeological site of the ancient city of Troy, in present-day northwestern Turkey.

Opened in 2018, it exhibits in seven sections of a contemporary architectural building the historical artefacts from Troy and some other ancient cities around and on nearby islands. The museum director is Rıdvan Gölcük. The Museum was granted the '2020 European Museum of the Year Special Appreciation Award' and the 'European Museum Academy Special Award'.

== Museum building ==
Troy Museum is situated about 800 m (2,600 ft) east of the archaeological site of the city of Troy at Tevfikiye village, in the Çanakkale, northwestern Turkey.

The design competition for the museum building was awarded to the Turkish architectural firm Yalın Mimarlık in 2011. The structure embodies a contemporary minimalist architectural style. Construction commenced in 2013 but faced a temporary halt in 2015; however, it resumed in 2017, allowing the project to move forward toward completion.

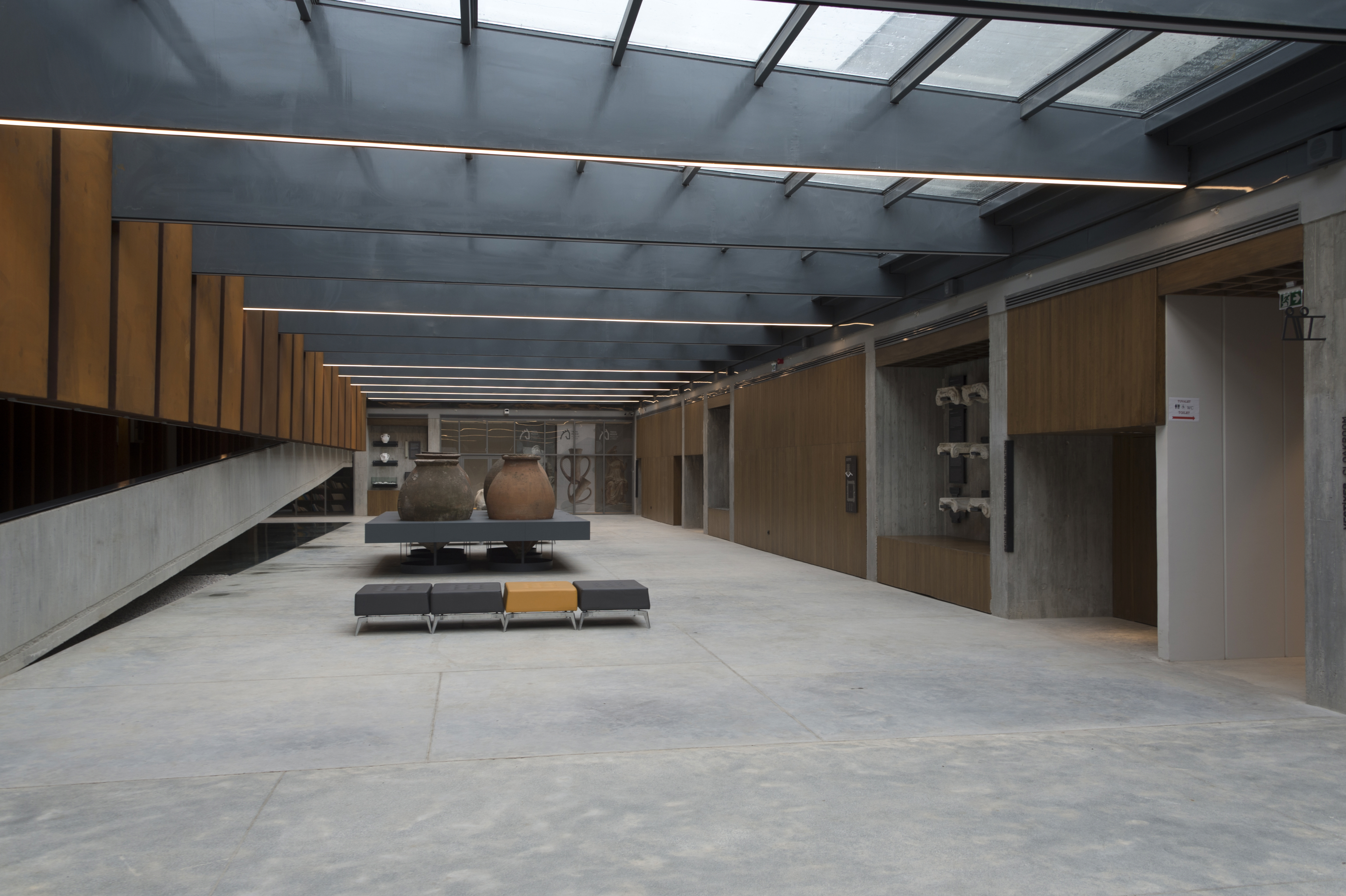
A view from the museum's interior

The cube-shaped building with four floors in square plan is clad in rust-colored weathering steel to give the impression that it was excavated from the archaeological site. The building's height is equivalent to the depth of the excavation at the archaeological site of Troy. The exhibition areas cover 2,700 m^{2} (29,000 sq ft) of the total 12,750 m^{2} (137,200 sq ft) indoor area. The exhibition areas of 32 m × 32 m (105 ft × 105 ft) are enclosed by workplaces, storages, and conference rooms. The basement is reserved for service functions. Entrance to the museum is by a 12 m (39 ft)-wide ramp leading to an underground gate.

The total cost of the building came to ₺ 45 million (approx. $8 million). The museum was opened on 10 October 2018, the "Year of Troy" as declared in Turkey.

== Exhibitions ==
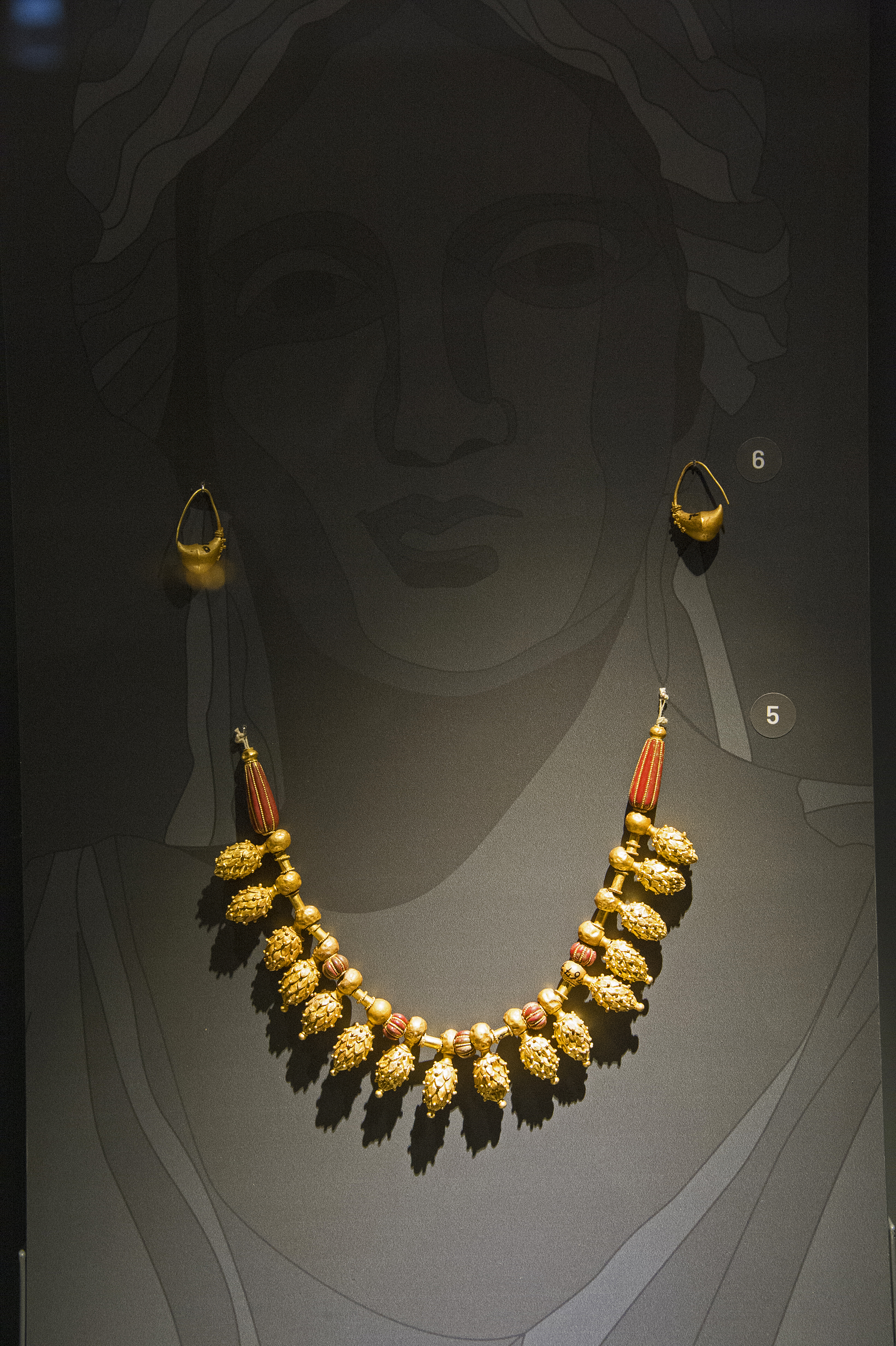
Gold necklace

The niches on the walls of the entrance ramp contain gravestones, large-sized statues, scenes and mural-sized photographs from the various levels of the excavation in Troy. At the entrance, information about the archaeological science, archaeological dating methods and terms like the conservation and restoration of cultural heritage, tumulus and the prehistoric periods of the Neolithic, Chalcolithic, Bronze Age and Iron Age are explained to the visitor for orientation purposes. The museum also features visual graphical designs, dioramas and interactive displays.

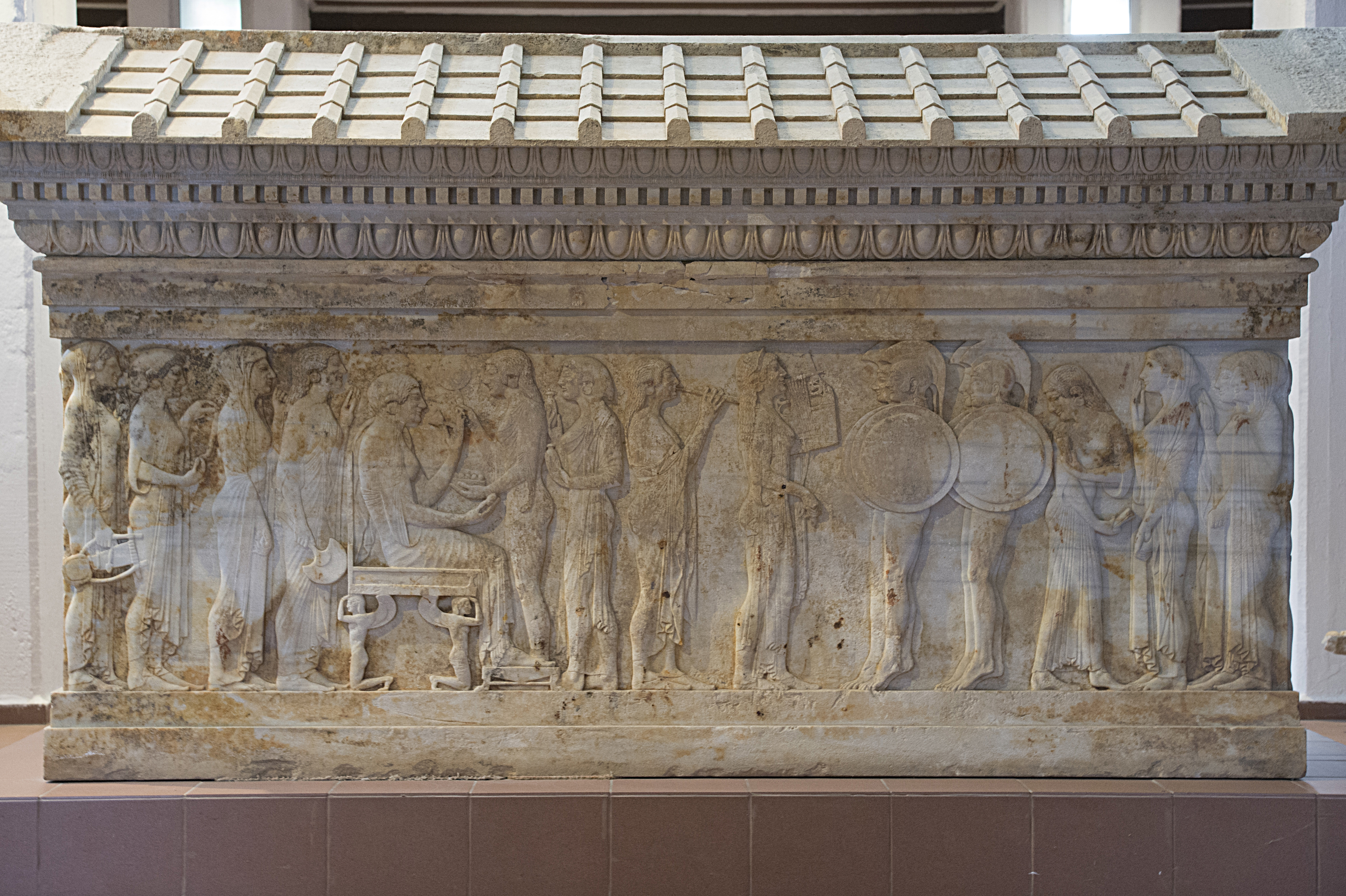
Polyxena sarcophagus

The museum contains seven sections. The ground floor is reserved for artefacts from the Troad region, today Biga Peninsula. These are archaeological remains from the ancient cities of Assos (Behramkale), Tenedos (Bozcaada), Parium, Alexandria Troas (Eski Stambul), Smintheion, Lampsacus (near Lapseki), Thymbra, Tavolia and Imbros (Gökçeada). On display are about 2,000 pieces from the museum's collection of around 40,000 diverse artefacts, which were transferred from the Çanakkale Archaeological Museum, İstanbul Archaeology Museums and the Museum of Anatolian Civilizations. Transfer of Troy coins from the İzmir Archaeological Museum was requested. The exhibits include tear catchers, glass and terracotta perfume bottles, figurines, gold pieces, necklaces and bracelets, coins, ornaments, bone objects and tools, metal containers, terracotta potteries, weapons, axes and cutters, milestones, inscriptions, altars, sarcophagi, sculptures and many other special pieces from the area's 5,000-year old history. Among the notable pieces are the 1994-excavated Polyxena sarcophagus and the 2012-discovered statue of Greek god Triton. Stone artefacts, columns, steles, and column capitals are exhibited in the museum yard.
