= Manfredo =

Manfredo is a given name. Notable people with the name include:

- Manfredo Alipala (1938–2006), Filipino boxer who competed at the 1964 Summer Olympics
- Manfredo do Carmo (1928–2018), Brazilian mathematician, former president of the Brazilian Mathematical Society
- Manfredo Fanti (1806–1865), Italian general, founder of the Regio Esercito
- Manfredo Fest (1936–1999), legally blind bossa nova and jazz pianist and keyboardist from Brazil
- Peter Manfredo Jr. (born 1980), American professional boxer and former IBO middleweight champion
- Manfredo Manfredi (1859–1927), Italian architect
- Manfredo de Clermont, Conte di Motica (died 1391), Sicilian nobleman
- Manfredo Pietrantonio (born 1998), Italian football player
- Manfredo I of Saluzzo (died 1175), the first marquess of Saluzzo, serving in that capacity from 1125 until his death
- Manfredo II of Saluzzo (1140–1215), the second marquess of Saluzzo from his father's death in 1175 to his own
- Manfredo III of Saluzzo (died 1244), the third Marquess of Saluzzo, from 1215 to his death
- Manfredo IV of Saluzzo (died 1330), the fifth marquess of Saluzzo from 1296, the son and successor of Thomas I
- Manfredo V of Saluzzo, marquess of Saluzzo from 1330 and 1332, and later usurper from 1341 to 1342
- Manfredo Tafuri (1935–1994), Italian architect, historian, theoretician, critic and academic

== See also ==
- Monument to General Manfredo Fanti, Florence
- Manfred
- Manfredingi
- Manfredonia
