= Trotti =

Trotti is a surname. Notable people with it include:

- Carlo Trotti (d. 1612), Roman Catholic bishop
- Constance Trotti (1800–1871), Belgian noble
- Euclide Trotti, Italian painter
- Giovanni Battista Trotti (1555–1612), Italian painter
- Lamar Trotti (1900–1952), American screenwriter, producer and motion picture executive
- Lorenzo Trotti (1633–1700), Roman Catholic archbishop
- Samuel W. Trotti (1810–1856), American politician
- Sandro Trotti (born 1934), Italian painter

== Other uses ==
- Trotti, Texas, an unincorporated community
