= Pio Fedi =

Italian sculptor

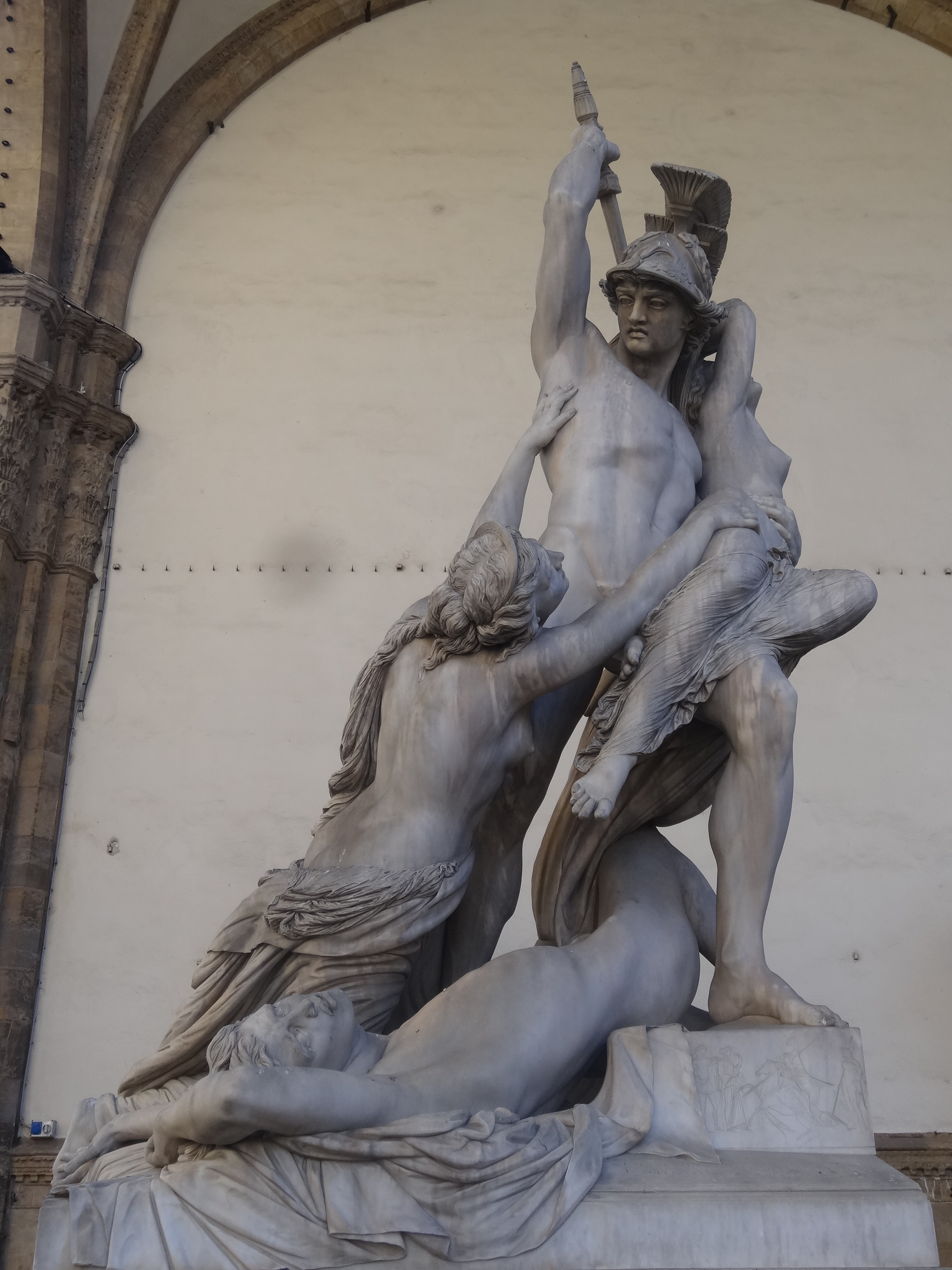
The Rape of Polyxena

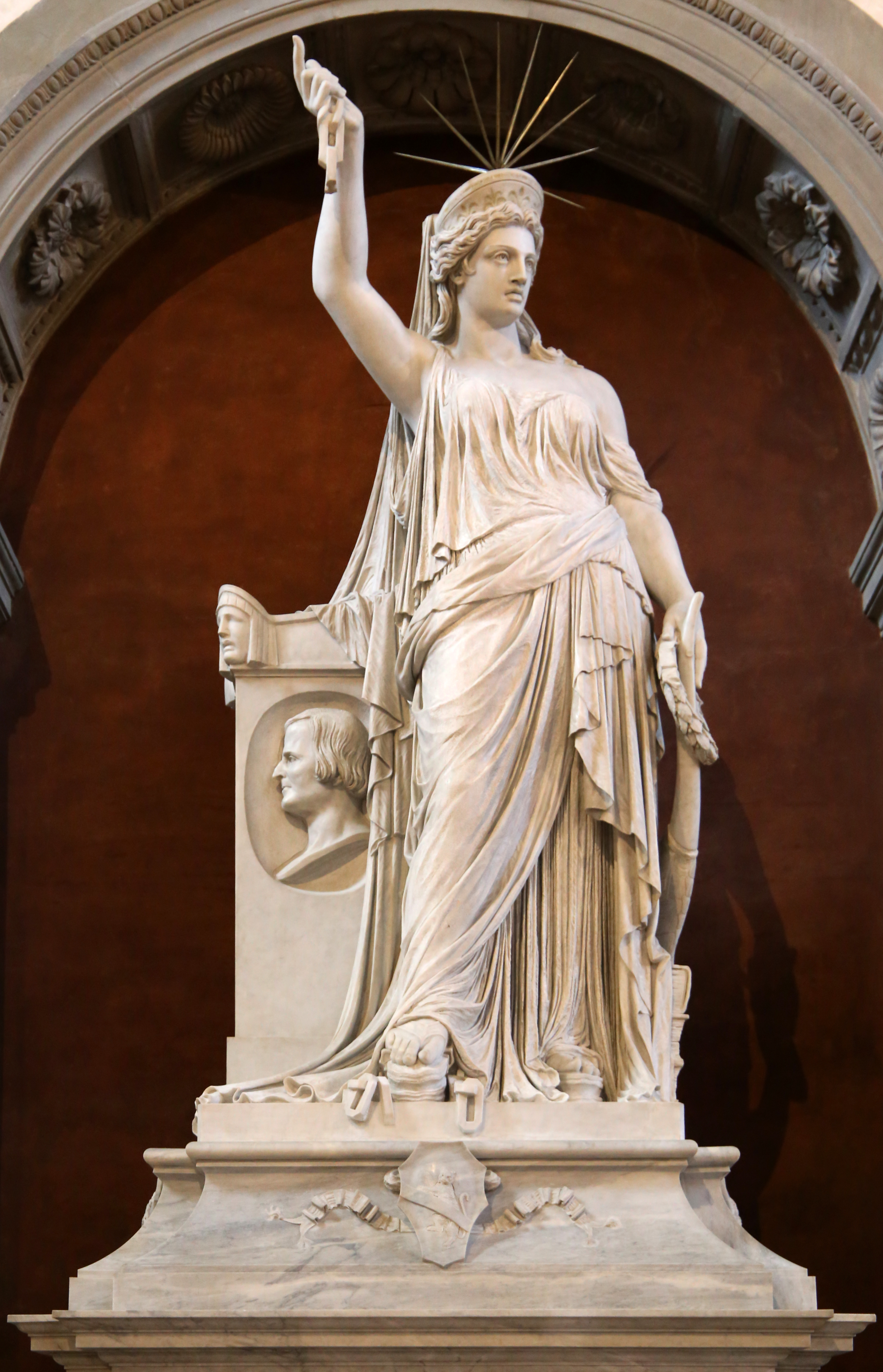
The Freedom of Poetry

Pio Fedi (31 May 1816, Viterbo - 1 June 1892, Florence) was an Italian sculptor who worked chiefly in the Romantic style.

== Biography ==
He was born to Leopoldo Fedi, a small landowner, and his wife, Camilla née Franchini. Due to economic difficulties, they left Viterbo when he still quite young; living in Arezzo and Florence. There, he worked for a goldsmith. This led to lessons in engraving from Raffaello Sanzio Morghen and Giovita Garavaglia. From 1838 to 1840, he lived in Vienna with his father and continued his studies at the Academy of Fine Arts, but he was forced to abandon that potential career due to eye problems caused by the acid fumes.

After returning to Florence, from 1842 to 1846 he studied sculpture with Lorenzo Bartolini at the Academy of Fine Arts. There, he obtained a scholarship that enabled him to study in Rome at the Accademia di San Luca. His primary instructor there was Pietro Tenerani. One his first independent works, a plaster relief of "Christ the Healer", is preserved at San Luca. In 1873, the Accademia named him an "Academician of Merit".

His most familiar sculpture is the Rape of Polyxena (1866), in the Loggia dei Lanzi. He is also known for two sculptures in the Loggiato degli Uffizi depicting the illustrious Tuscans, Nicola Pisano and Andrea Cesalpino. His other works include The Fury of Atamante, King of Thebes, The Genius of Fishing, Hope Nourishing Love, Hyppolite and Dianora del Bardi, and Castalla persecuted by Apollon.

In addition, he designed the Monument to General Manfredo Fanti, molded in bronze by Clemente Papi, which stands in the Piazza San Marco. His memorial to the poet Giovanni Battista Niccolini is in the church of Santa Croce. The statue, an allegory of the Freedom of Poetry, may have inspired Bartholdi's depiction of the Statue of Liberty. He also created a statue of Pietro Torrigiani, the Mayor of Florence.

From 1842, he had a studio at 99 Via dei Serragli, in an old monastery. Currently an actor's training school, it is still known as the Galleria Pio Fedi. One of his best known students was Giovanni Bastianini.
