= Manfredingi =

The Manfredingi were an Italian noble family. The lineage is said to trace back a Manfredo who lived in the 6th century. Branches of the family included the Guasco, the Boidi and the Trotti.
