= Ștefan Arteni =

Romanian artist (1947–2020)

- Born: August 21, 1947; Bucharest, Romania
- Died: April 1, 2020 (aged 72); New York City, United States
- Other names: Kyosen, Geizan
- Education: Ion Mincu University of Architecture and Urban Planning, Accademia di Belle Arti di Roma, New York University
- Occupation: Artist
- Years active: 1966-2020
- Employer: Independent Artist
- Known for: Eastern Asian Calligraphy, religious and secular paintings
- Notable work: "The Way of Form", "The Sign of the Logos"
- Style: Abstract
- Spouse: Myriam Sánchez Posada de Arteni
- Awards: Title of Shihan, Master Seal Carver, Japan Foreign Minister's Grand Prize for Calligraphy
- Website: www.stefanarteni.net

Ștefan C. Arteni (September 21, 1947 – April 1, 2020) was a Romanian artist, painter, calligrapher, architect, historian, essayist, and translator. His work focused on east Asian calligraphy, as well as secular and religious paintings.

== Early life ==
Arteni was born on September 21, 1947, in Bucharest, Romania, to Constanța Arteni and Vasile Arteni, a physician who specialized in otorhinolaryngology. Ștefan grew up primarily in Bucharest, and as a teenager was introduced to eastern Asian characters and letters while watching the movie Harakiri (1962) on his black-and-white family television set. Eastern Asian characters and letters piqued his curiosity and he discovered a passion, deep respect and understanding for the oriental arts, symbols, and calligraphy. In a letter to his close friend Michael Finkenthal, he expressed the impact this experience had on him, and how it influenced his style and later work:

My interest in calligraphy began in high school. My Japanization - he wrote - began with that black-and-white film Harakiri, seen in the motherland: every image perfectly composed and especially... the ritual. I was profoundly impressed by the perfect composition of each image. Many scenes suggest a wonderful calligraphic dance. In terms of its content, the motion picture draws attention to the performative qualities of ritual.

After attending the Nicolae Tonitza High School of Fine Arts between 1961 and 1965, he was denied admission to a Fine Arts program in the state-run university system because his liberal parents were considered politically unreliable by Nicolae Ceaușescu's regime. As a result, he studied architecture at the Ion Mincu University of Architecture and Urban Planning, from which he graduated in 1970.

== 1971 - present ==
His early life was profoundly impacted by the communist regime in Romania under Ceaușescu's administration. Due to the harsh conditions by the communist party, upon completion of his studies in 1971, Arteni's parents' graduation gift was a trip to Paris to study the city's great museums. However, his parents' real intentions were to flee Romania and remain in exile. As such, they escaped Romania in 1971 and sought political asylum in Rome, Italy, due to cultural and financial reasons.

Arteni never returned to his native land, but the imprint of the country never left his sense of self.

After a few weeks, in 1971 at the age of 24, Arteni enrolled in the Accademia di Belle Arti di Roma, where he studied with Luigi Montanarini and Sandro Trotti, both celebrated painters. On the very first day of class he met Myriam Sánchez Posada, a fellow student from Colombia. They became inseparable and married in 1975. In the words of Arteni, "together we wandered into the labyrinth of art".

At this point in his career, Arteni increased his emphasis on abstract forms in his painting, while continuing his exploration of line, color, and composition.

In Rome, between 1972 and 1974 he thoroughly explored Italian painting and art and worked for the Romanian broadcast of Vatican Radio as a redactor and art historian. He wrote, produced, and broadcast 61-episode series on Christian Art in Europe. In this time period, he exhibited some of his first works and published some of the results of the research he and Myriam made on materials and techniques of painting, authoring over 40 papers published by the International Council of Museums, on techniques, individual artists, materials and the theory of art. These investigations were presented in the form of scientific papers at various international conferences, and are currently being used in several European teaching institutions.

In 1977, Arteni and his wife Myriam, herself an award-winning painter and skilled fine art book-maker, left Rome and moved to New York City, where they established themselves and lived together for the remainder of his life until his death in 2020 at the age of 72, due to a sudden and aggressive form of cancer.

== Career ==
Arteni continued his informal studies of art at several universities in New York, but as a formal student he studied at Chinese, Korean, and Japanese calligraphy. He pursued his education in art history, fine arts, icon and mural painting, and the restitution and conservation of architectural monuments.

Arteni became a student of Tanaka Setsuzan, a Living Master and President of the Nihon Shodo Geijutsu Kyokai (the Japanese Calligraphy Art Association), founded by Kamijo Shinzan, one of the greatest calligraphers of Japan.

He pursued studies in architecture, art, history, fine arts, icon and mural painting, and the restitution and conservation of architectural monuments. He was also proficient in several languages including Romanian, English, Spanish, French, Italian, Japanese, Russian, Latin, Greek, and German.

Building upon Hesychast and Zen spirituality, Ștefan Arteni, who sometimes used the sobriquet Kyosen (Crazy Hermit), also taught calligraphy: dwelling in art, stilling the mind, enstasis and meditation with the brush.

Arteni described the process of painting as second-order cybernetics in action. The appropriate epistemology is constructivist. The ludic ritual act of the performance event creates form.

Arteni's work echoes the myth of Ulysses, it is a quest leading the artist to address the intersection of art and meditative spirituality at the heart of form.

== Awards ==
In 2005, Arteni was awarded the highest rank in Japanese calligraphy, the title of Shihan, an honorific title used to refer to Master Teachers or masters of a specific style. He is the only non-Japanese artist to earn the title, to date. According to the ancient custom, along with his promotion to the rank of master came the bestowing of a new calligraphy name, Geizan, which translates from Japanese as "Art Mountain". The name was given to Arteni by Tanaka Setsuzan.

During this period, Arteni was also the first western artist to be awarded the title of Master Seal Carver. His seals have been favorably compared to Qi Baishi's, the President of the China Artists Association, whose artistic style showed no signs of western influence.

In competitions organized by the Japan Calligraphic Art Academy in Tokyo and the Japan Calligraphy Center in Los Angeles, Arteni was awarded the Japan Foreign Minister's Grand Prize for Calligraphy in 1996 and 2005, the Silver Award for Kana in 1999, and the Grand Prize for Calligraphy of the Japanese Consul in 2002.

== Works ==
Arteni has extensively exhibited calligraphies and paintings throughout Europe, the United States and in Japan, Korea, China and Taiwan, with over 50 exhibitions. His works are in numerous prestigious private, public and corporate collections. In addition, Arteni frequently provided demonstrations and lectures on many aspects of his work. He participated in numerous international conferences and expositions over the years.

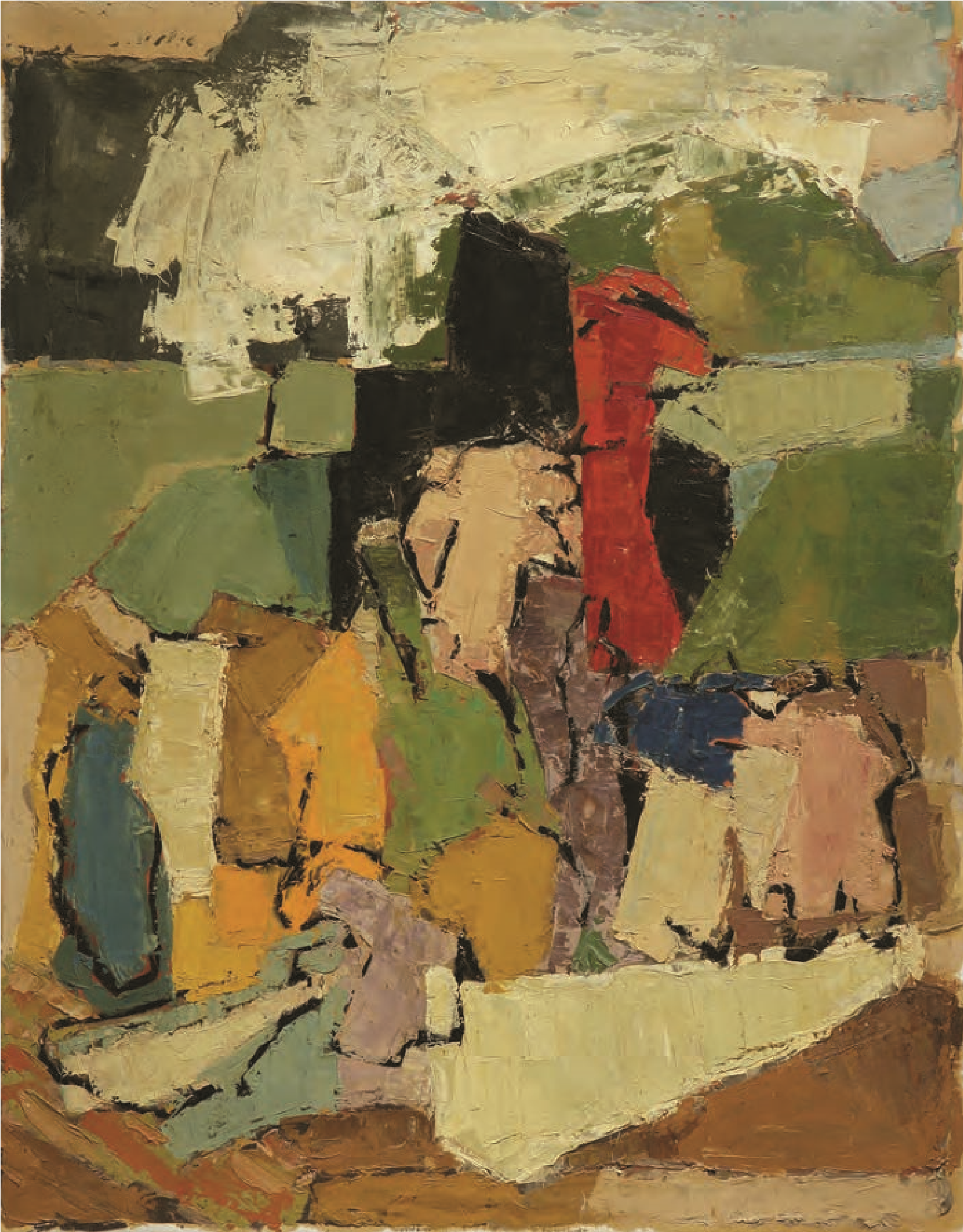
DEPOSITION - Oil Canvas from "The Way of Form" - Retrospective Exhibition in New York

Year	Title	Location
1973	"Mostra Personalle de Pittura"	Galleria La Papessa, Rome, Italy
1973	"Mostra Personale di Myriam Sánchez Posada e Ștefan Arteni"	Galleria L'Accento, Rome, Italy
1974	"L'Arte Giapponese in Italia"	Foreign Press Club (Rome)
1990	"Art in Exile"	Manhattan East Gallery (New York)
1991	Unknown	Manhattan East Gallery (New York)
1992	Unknown	Manhattan East Gallery (New York)
1995	Unknown	Golden West College Galleries (Huntington Beach, California)
1995	Unknown	Sumner Museum (Washington, DC)
1996	Unknown	Doizaki Galleries (Los Angeles)
1996	Unknown	Seton Hall University Galleries (South Orange, New Jersey)
1997	Unknown	Doizaki Galleries (Los Angeles)
1997	Unknown	Tweed Museum (Duluth, Minnesota)
1997	"East and West. Allegories"	Kobe Art Hall (Kobe, Japan)
1998	Unknown	Mansfield Freeman and Davison Center for the Arts, Wesleyan University (Middletown, Connecticut)
1998	Unknown	Doizaki Galleries (Los Angeles)
1999	Avant-garde Oriental Calligraphy	Doul Art Center (Seoul)
1999	Unknown	Doizaki Galleries (Los Angeles)
1999	"Scroll Fragments"	Kobe Art Hall, (Kobe, Japan)
1999	"The Sign of the Logos"	St. Mark's Library, The General Theological Seminary (New York)
1999	"Brushpaths"	The General Theological Seminary (New York)
2000	Unknown	Doizaki Galleries (Los Angeles)
2000	"Ink 2000"	Newhouse Salon, (Brooklyn, New York)
2000	"Orpheus"	St. Mark's Library Seabury Hall, The General Theological Seminary (New York)
2000	"A New Perspective on Contemporary Calligraphy: A Dialogue with Modern Sinitic Writing Art"	Taiwan Museum of Art and Seaport Art Center (Taichung, Taiwan)
2001	Unknown	Doizaki Galleries (Los Angeles)
2001	"Contemporary Calligraphy Masters, Representatives and Invitational Exhibition"	Tokyo Ginza Gallery Museum (Tokyo)
2002	Unknown	Doizaki Galleries (Los Angeles)
2003	Unknown	Tokyo Ginza Gallery Museum (Tokyo, Japan)
2003	"Art of Ink 2003"	Shaanxi History Museum (Xi'an, China)
2004	Unknown	Doizaki Galleries, (Los Angeles)
2004	"Art of Ink 2004"	Mobile Museum of Art (Mobile, Alabama)
2004	"Mulpa International Exhibition"	Mulpa Art Center (Seoul, Korea) and Seoho Museum (Seoul, Korea)
2004	"Yusho Ten"	Tokyo-Geijyutu-Gekijyo (Tokyo, Japan)
2005	"Energy and Diffusion" - Seoul Calligraphy Biennial	Seoul Museum of Art, Seoul Museum of History, Gong-Pyung Art Center, Gallery La Mer, Gong Gallery, Seoul, Korea
2005 - 2006	"The Way of Form" - Retrospective Exhibition	Q.C.C. Art Gallery, C.U.N.Y., New York
2006	Collective Exhibition "The World Calligraphy Festival"	International Modern Calligraphy Exhibition, Gong-Pyung Art Center, Seoul, Korea)
2007	"Art of ink"	Association Culturelle Franco-Japonaise de TENRI - Espace Culturel Bertin Poirée, Paris, France
2008	"On the Borderline"	National Seoul Art Center, Seoul, Korea
2008	"Art of Seal Carving in America 2008"	Irvine Fine Arts Center, Irvine, California
2009	"Calligraphy Trends Sprouting in Europe"	Sori Arts Center of Jeollabuk-do, Jeonju, South Korea
2009	"Ashdown Forest"	New York Public Library
2011	"Art of Ink"	Chiang Mai University, Thailand
2012	"Brushed Voices" (Art of Ink)	Shelter Rock Art Gallery, Unitarian Universalist Congregation, Manhasset, NY
2013	9th World Calligraphy Biennale of Jeollabuk-do	Sori Arts Center of Jeollabuk-do, Jeonju, South Korea
2013	"Art of Ink in America: Gesture and Beyond"	Godwin-Ternbach Museum, Queens College, NY
2014	"Art of Ink in America"	Alexey von Schlippe Gallery of Art, University of Connecticut
2017	Unknown	La National, Spanish Benevolent Society of New York
2018	"Composition"	Saphira & Ventura Gallery, Midtown NYC
2022	"Time Waits For No Man"	Miyako Hotel & Hammerfriar Gallery, California

== Publications and lecture demonstrations ==
Since 1974, Arteni has authored over one-hundred radio broadcasts and published papers on art history, the manufacture of artist's materials, the techniques and materials of painting, and aesthetics (phenomenology and systems theory).

He has participated in the Congresses of the International Council of Museums (Committee for Conservation), the Deutsches Farbenzentrum, the Chinese Society for Aesthetics, ICMS8 (Gestes, formes et processus signifiants en musique et semiotique interarts), and in numerous other international Symposia and Conferences. Arteni has also participated in the Conferences of and chaired the I.S.F. Section "Lipids in Art" in the United States, England, and France.

In recent years, he has lectured on and demonstrated calligraphy (Greek, Sanskrit, Chinese, and Japanese), and participated in workshops in New York (1995 and 1996); the Freeman Center for East Asian Studies at Wesleyan University, Middletown, CT (1998); Columbia University, New York (1998); and Saint Mark Library, General Theological Seminary, New York (1999).

He concentrated his research on the pictorial fact and procedural switches between formal contextures, the ludic ritual act of performance event that creates a form-space, art communication as a high-context process, the mereotopology of formal constructs, metacultural sensibility and complexity theory, and the complementarity of painting and calligraphy.

Arteni is also the first Western artist to master the art of seal cutting and is co-founder of Sol Invictus Press (sol invictus means invincible sun, which is a reference to the last Roman god before the Christianization of the Roman Empire). Many of their creations have been included in the Bodleian Library at Oxford University. These works extensively detailed Arteni's fascination and love of calligraphy from different cultures.

He has also pioneered the art of sumi ink monoprinting and large-size seal cutting, and has explored and expanded the horizon of clay monoprinting. In addition to painting and calligraphy, Arteni demonstrated his excellence in drawing, printmaking and collage. He also expanded his art into new materials, including alkyds, gouache, watercolor and red seal paste.

His limited-edition published books have been widely exhibited:

Year	Location
2022	Symbiosis of Script, Font, and Form: A Selection of Artists’ Books - Laudes Creaturarum - Bridwell Library Special Collections
2004	"In Memoriam Daniel Simko. Word as Icon" - The New York Public Library, Slavic and Baltic Division (New York)
2000	22 Book Artists - Harper Collins Exhibition Space (New York)
1998	Retrospective of Artist's Books and Related Materials - St. Mark's Library, The General Theological Seminary (New York)
1998	The Horticultural Society of New York (New York)
1997	Center for Book Arts (New York)
1997	Marymount College (New York)
1996	F. I. R. A. (Montreal)
1996	Soho Biennial (New York)
1996	The Center for Book Arts (New York)
1993	The Armory (New York)
1993	Andrew Melon Auditorium (Washington, DC)
1993	The Corcoran (Washington, DC)
1993	Phoenix Public Library (Phoenix, Arizona)
1992	Humphrey Gallery (New York)

Bibliography
Year	Books
2020	Don Quixote - 12 paintings
2019	Stories Of Ulysses
2019	The Return Of Ulysses
2019	The Form Of The Form
2019	Rebellion
2019	The Calligraphy Of Stefan Arteni
2013	Mioriţa: dosarul mitologic al unei capodopere (Romanian)
2013	Mioritic poems
2013	Rebellion = Rebeldía
2010	Mioriţa: un dosar mitologic (Romanian)
2009	Mic tratat de estetică teologică
2007	The return of Ulysses
2005	The way of form
1997	Fool of a cat...: haiku
1996	Paper, art & the book: Center for Book Arts, New York City
1996	Apocalypse
1996	Studies and proofs for Laudes creaturarum (Italian)
1996	Studies for Cantique de Saint Jean
1992	Laudes creaturarum
1981	The medium and grounds of 17th century Flemish and Dutch pictures of flowers
Year	Articles
1988	The essential dilemma of contemporary painting
1988	Drawing materials water-base mediums
1984	Materials of the artist, the survival of traditional grounding and priming methods for oil painting
1984	Glas sub-surface painting in Romania, seventeenth to twentieth centuries
1984	Critical evaluation of data on the composition of ancient materials. P 1: Structural components of painter layer. P 2: Paints and technics
1984	The secret of masters: Historical controversies and hypotheses
1984	From Handcraft to Mass production: notes on the manufacture of oil painting materials
1984	Critical evaluation of data on the composition of ancient materials: part. I: Structural components of the paint layer: part. II: Paints and techniques
1984	The secret of the Masters: historical controversies and hypotheses
1981	The medium et grounds of 17th century Flemish et Dutch pictures of flowers
1981	Two retouching media
1981	Painter, manufacturer of artists' materials, and conservator: historical and aesthetic significance of their role in the survival of a painting
1981	Painter, manufacturer of artists' materials and conservator: historical and aesthetic significance of their role in the
Year	Translations
2007	Fanny Sanín: la struttura cromatica

Arteni's stylistic matrix consists of the interplay of Byzantine tradition, Western formal procedures, and Far Eastern calligraphy and seal-carving methods, a simultaneous plurality of interwoven recursive and permutative differences.
