= Polyxena =

Princess of Troy in Greek mythology

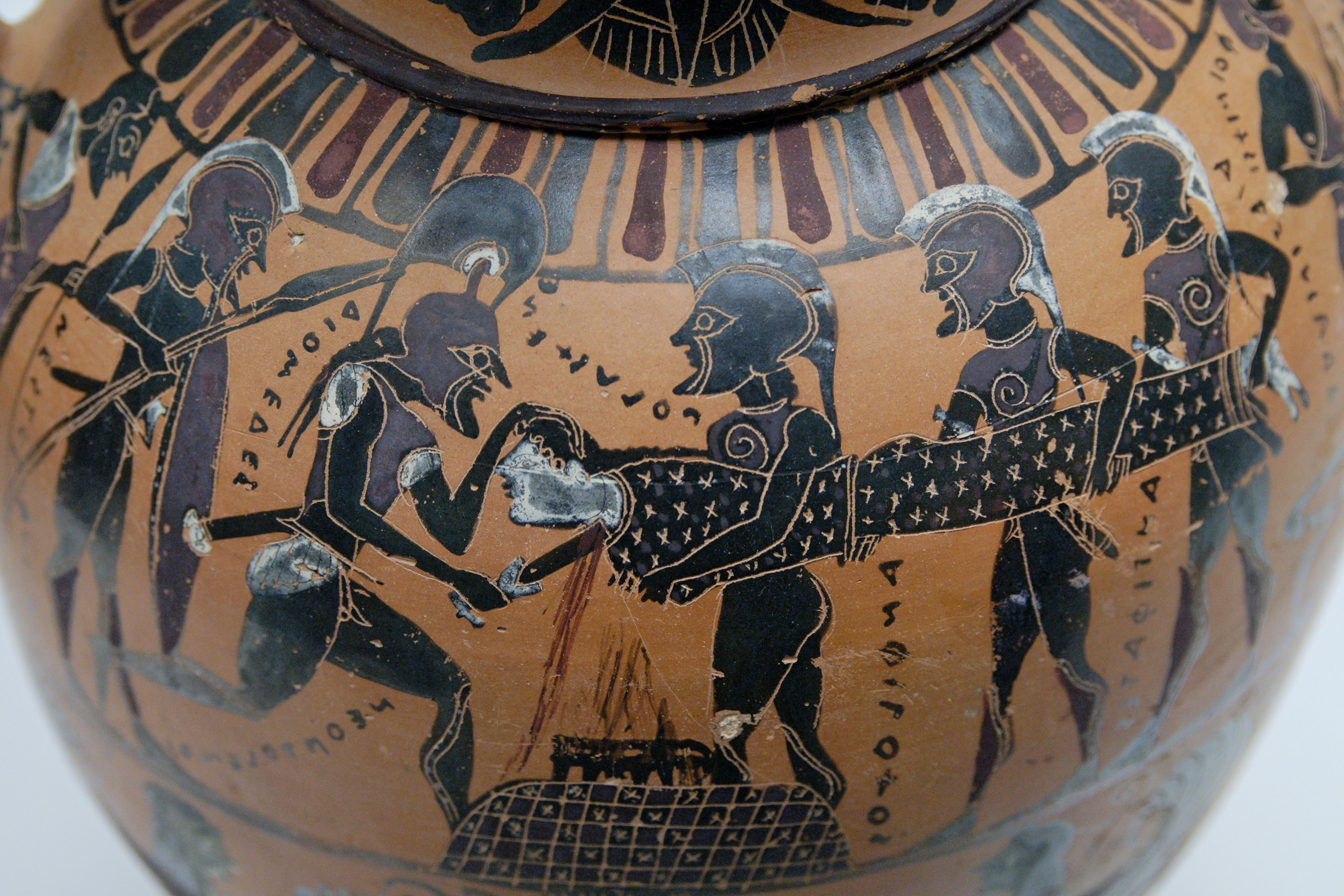
The sacrifice of Polyxena by the triumphant Greeks. Attic black-figure Tyrrhenian amphora, 570–550 BC.

In Greek mythology, Polyxena (/pəˈlɪksənə/; Ancient Greek: Πολυξένη, romanized: Poluxénē or Polyxénē, lit. 'entertaining many guests' or 'very hospitable') was the youngest daughter of King Priam of Troy and his queen, Hecuba. She does not appear in Homer, but in several other classical authors, though the details of her story vary considerably. After the fall of Troy, she dies when sacrificed by the Greeks on the tomb of Achilles, to whom she was sometimes betrothed and in whose death she was involved in later versions.

Polyxena stands between Priam and Neoptolemus as the latter attacks Priam with the body of Astyanax. Athenian red-figure kylix by Euphronius, 525–475 BC.

== Description ==
Polyxena was described by the chronicler Malalas in his account of the Chronography as "tall, pure, very white, large-eyed, black-haired, with her hair worn long behind, a good nose and cheeks, blooming-lipped, small-footed, virgin, charming, very beautiful, 18 years old when they killed her." Meanwhile, in the account of Dares the Phrygian, she was illustrated as "fair, tall, and beautiful. Her neck was slender, her eyes lovely her hair blonde and long, her body well-proportioned, her fingers tapering, her legs straight, and her feet the best. Surpassing all the others in beauty, she remained a completely ingenuous and kind-hearted woman."

== Myth ==
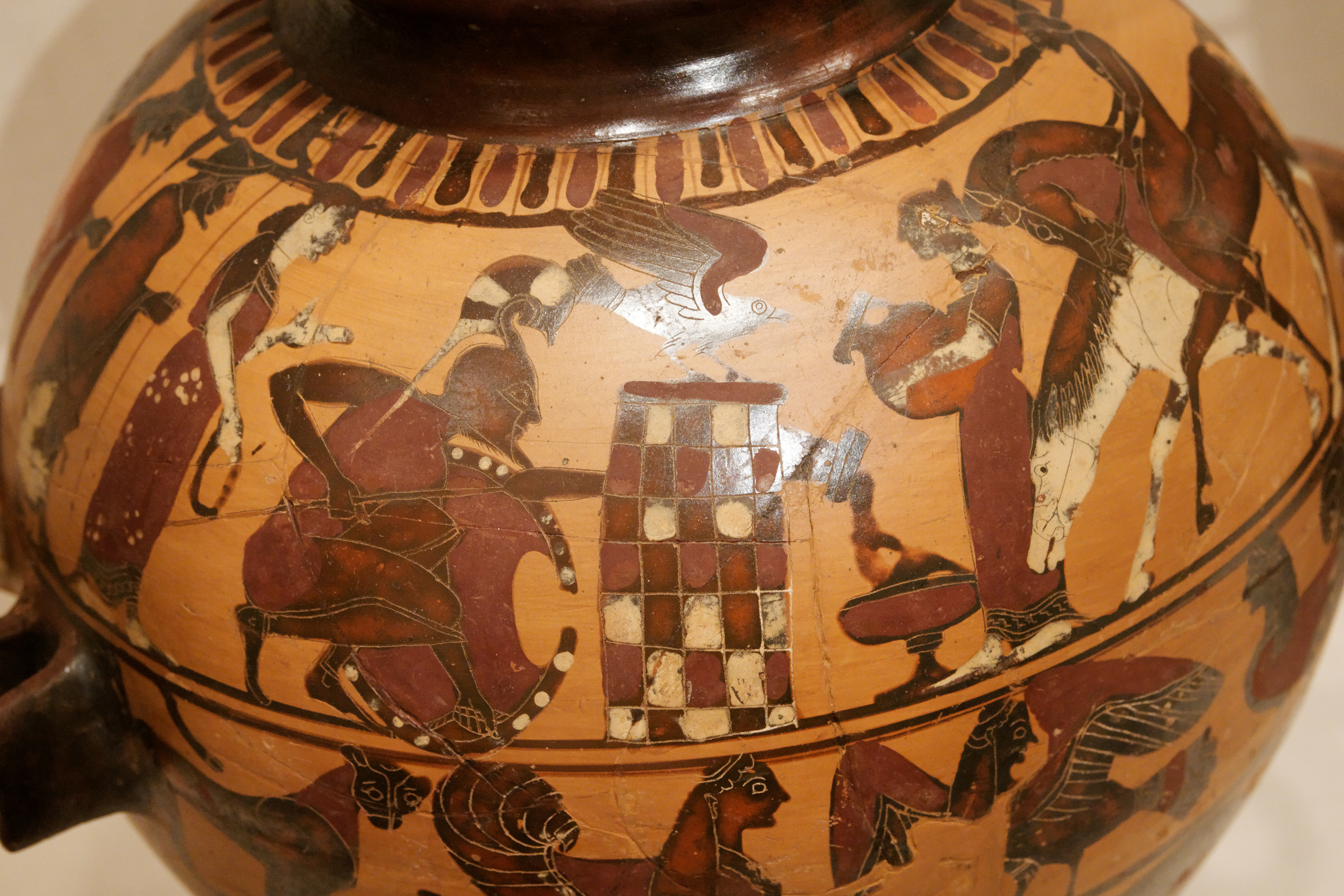
Achilles prepares to attack Troilus, who is on horseback behind Polyxena. Attic black-figure hydria attributed to the Painter of London B76, 560–550 BC.

Polyxena and Troilus flee from Achilles. Attic black-figure hydria attributed to the Antimenes Painter, 520–515 BC.

Polyxena is considered the Trojan version of Iphigenia, daughter of Agamemnon and Clytemnestra. She is not in Homer's Iliad, but appears in works by other poets.

During the Trojan War, Polyxena and her brother Troilus were ambushed when they were attempting to fetch water from a fountain. Troilus was pursued and killed by the Greek warrior Achilles.

Later works, such as the accounts of Dares and Dictys, involve Polyxena in the death of Achilles. Upon seeing her, the Greek fell madly in love. After Achilles had killed her brother Hector, Polyxena came with her father Priam to ask for the return of his corpse. Priam offered Achilles her hand, but Achilles said they would arrange the marriage at another time. Paris and Deiphobus secretly sent a messenger to Achilles to tell him to come to the temple of Apollo for their sister Polyxena. When he arrived, they ambushed and killed him. In another account, Paris happened to find Achilles with Polyxena in the shrine. Apollo held the arrows with which Paris aimed at and killed Achilles.

=== Death ===
Neoptolemus leads Polyxena to be sacrificed. The shade of Achilles appears over his tomb. Attic black-figure hydria, 530–510 BC.

In the Epic Cycle, Arctinus of Miletus' lost Ilioupersis depicted the Greeks sacrificing Polyxena at the tomb of Achilles after they burn Troy.

Euripides, in his plays The Trojan Women and Hecuba, details Polyxena's famous death at the end of the Trojan War. After the sack of Troy, Achilles' ghost had come back to the Greeks to demand the human sacrifice of Polyxena so as to appease the wind needed to set sail back to Hellas. She was to be killed at the foot of Achilles' grave. Hecuba, Polyxena's mother, expressed despair at the death of another of her daughters. (Polyxena was killed after almost all of her brothers and sisters.)

However, Polyxena declared she would rather die than live as a slave. She reassured her mother, and refused to beg before Odysseus or be treated in any way other than a princess. She asked that Odysseus reassure her mother as she is led away. Polyxena's virginity was critical to the honor of her character, and she was described as dying bravely as the son of Achilles, Neoptolemus, slit her throat. She arranged her clothing around her carefully so that she was fully covered when she died.

“The whole crowd of the Achaean army was there en masse before the tomb for the slaughter of your girl. The son of Achilles then took Polyxena by the hand and made her stand on the top of the mound. And I was near by. Picked young men selected from the Achaeans attended, to hold down your poor girl if she struggled. Then Achilles’ son took a full goblet all of gold in his hands and raised on high the libation for his dead father. He signaled to me to call for silence from the whole Achaean army. And I stood up in the middle and said these words: ‘Silence, Achaeans, let the whole host be silent! Silence! Not a word!’ And I hushed the crowd to stillness. and he said, ‘O son of Peleus, my father, receive from me this libation which summons up the dead, and be appeased. Come, so that you may drink a virgin’s pure dark blood which the army and I give to you. Show yourself well disposed towards us and grant that we may untie the ropes which hold our ships’ sterns fast, meet with a favorable return from Troy and, all of us, reach our native land.’ That was what he said, and the whole army prayed after him. Then, seizing his sword of solid gold by the hilt, he started to draw it from its sheath, and with a nod he signaled to the young men picked from the Greek army to take hold of the girl. But when she saw this, she spoke out these words: ‘Argives, you who have sacked my city, I am happy to die. Let no one lay a hand on my body, I shall offer my neck with good courage. By the gods, leave me free when you kill me so that I can die a free woman! I am a princess and it would shame me to bear the name of slave among the dead.’ The host roared their approval and king Agamemnon told the young men to let the maiden go… When she heard this order of the master, she took hold of her dress and tore it from the top of her shoulder to the middle of her waist by the navel. Her lovely breasts and bosom were revealed like a statue’s, and sinking to her knees upon the ground she spoke the most heart-rending words of all: “Look at me! If you are eager to strike this bosom, young Neoptolemus, strike it now – or if you want to cut into my neck, here is my throat all ready.’ In his pity for the girl, he wavered between reluctance and eagerness, but then he cut her windpipe with his sword. Springs of blood welled forth. But even though she was dying, she nonetheless took great care to fall modestly, hiding what should be hidden from men’s eyes.”

Philostratus, however, claimed Polyxena committed suicide after Achilles' death upon his tomb.

=== In classical art ===
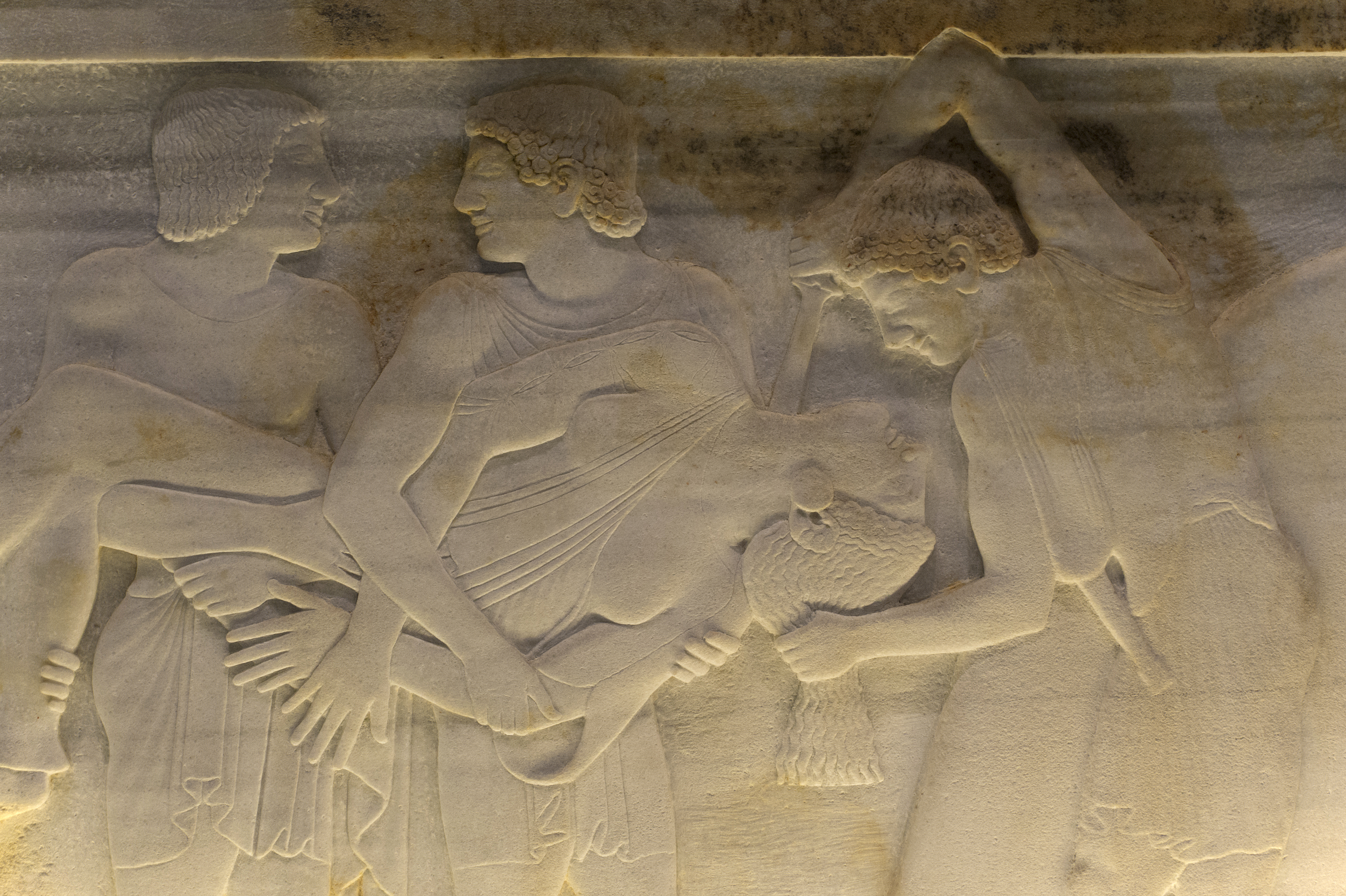
Sacrifice of Polyxena near the tumulus of Achilles. Polyxena sarcophagus, c.500 BC.

A few examples in Greek imagery can be securely identified as depicting the sacrifice of Polyxena. Most show Polyxena sacrificed over the tomb of Achilles. However, some details in the pictorial evidence of the sacrifice hint at varying and perhaps earlier versions of the story.

For instance, some images appear to show Polyxena sacrificed over an altar, rather than a tomb, and one sarcophagus relief, from Gümüşçay, the Polyxena sarcophagus, dated to c. 500 BC shows a tripod placed next to the tomb. These details have been interpreted as indicating an association between the burial mound of Achilles and sacred ground dedicated to Apollo.

=== Post-classical art ===
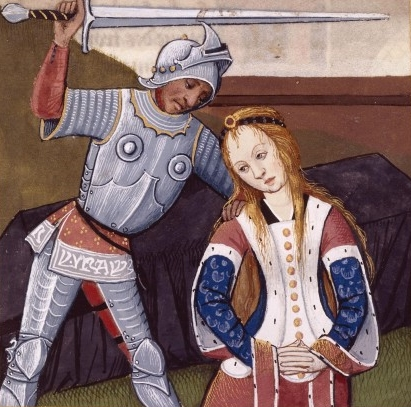
A Renaissance illustration of the killing of Polyxena in Boccaccio's De mulieribus claris

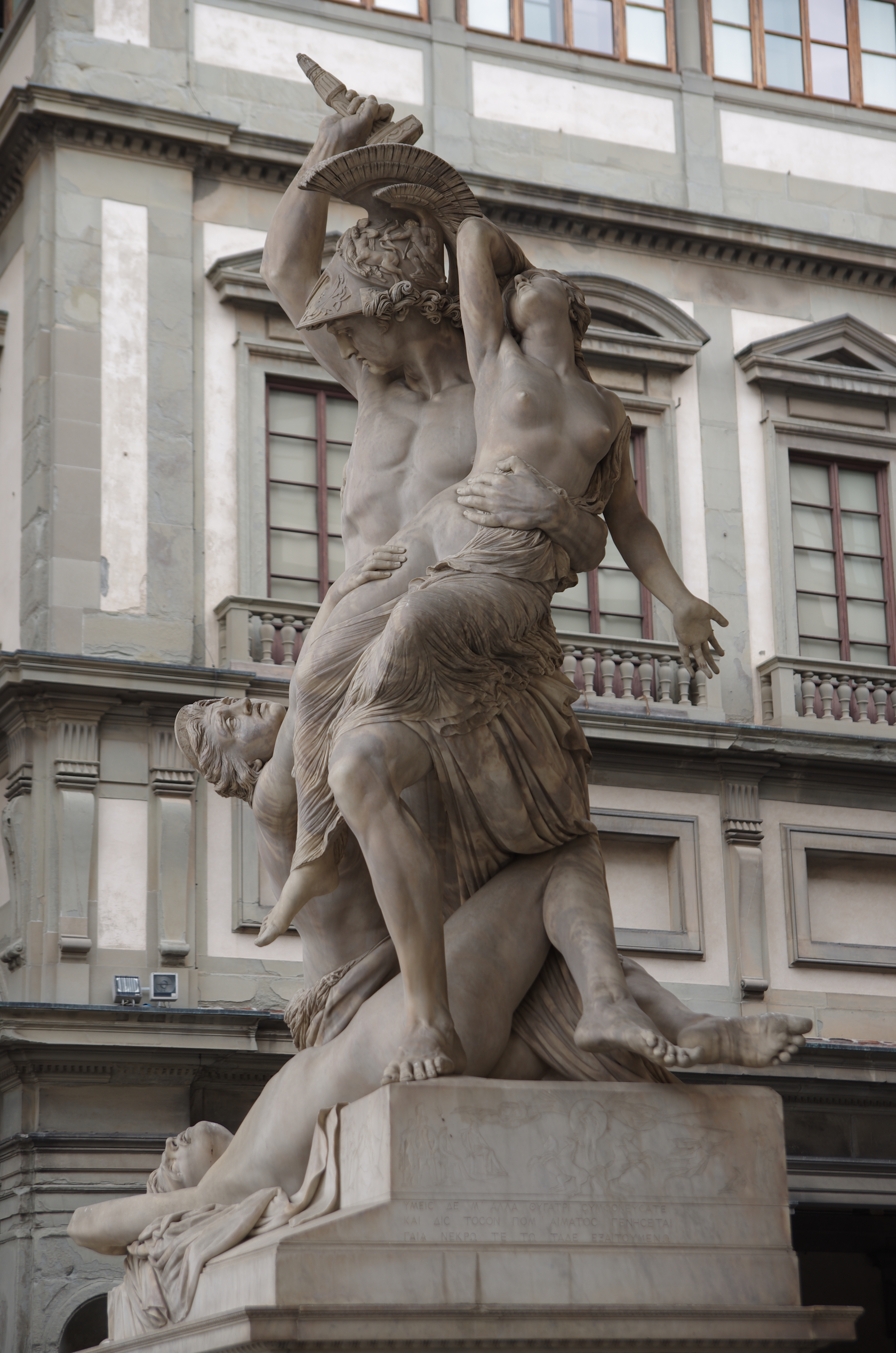
The Rape of Polyxena, Pio Fedi (1855–1865), Loggia dei Lanzi, Florence.

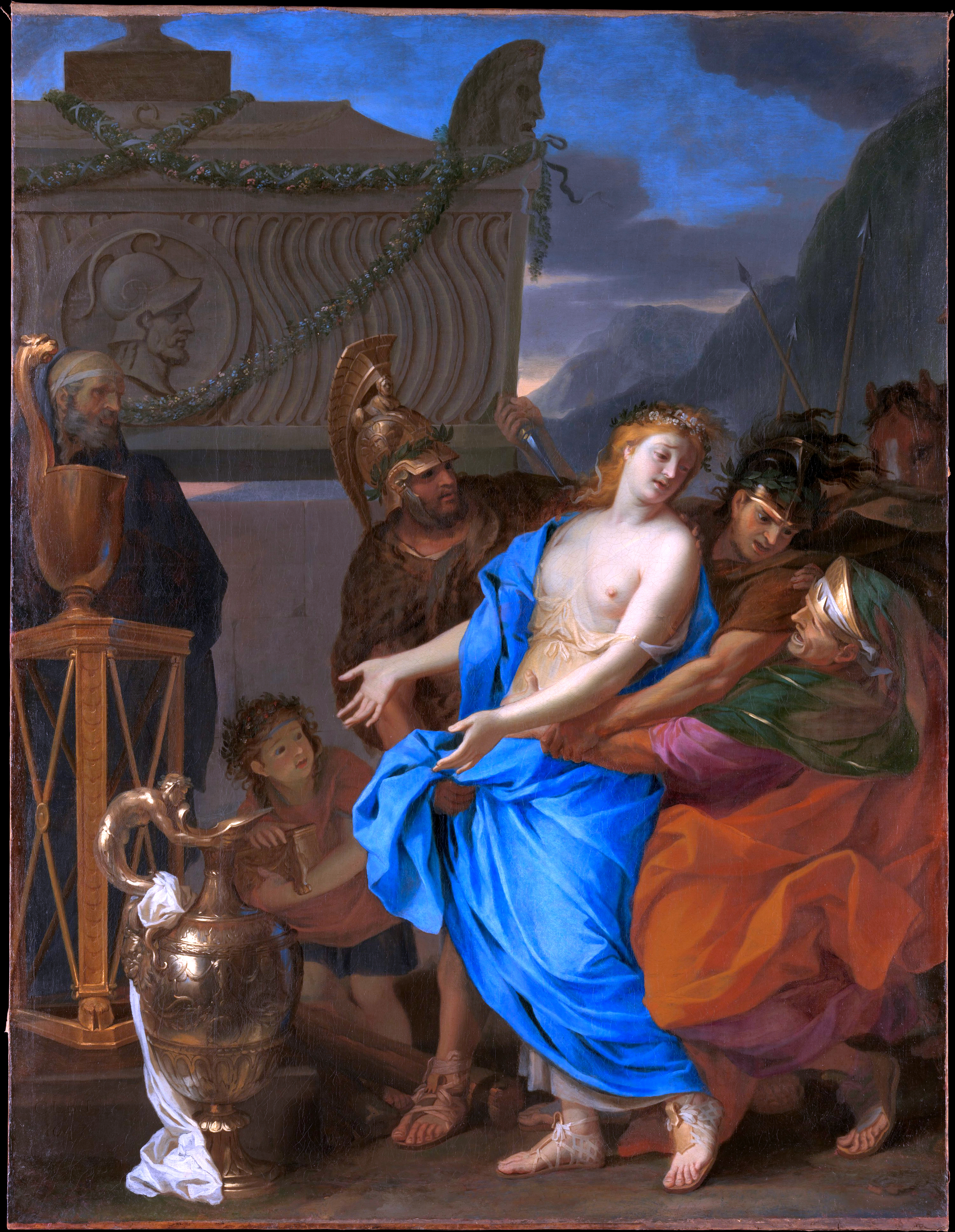
The Sacrifice of Polyxena, 1647, by Charles Le Brun, Metropolitan Museum of Art

There was a trickle of images in medieval and Renaissance art, often as illustrations to Boccaccio's De mulieribus claris. Primaticcio painted it in the Chateau of Fontainebleau (1541–47). But the subject became more popular in the Baroque, often paired with the Continence of Scipio. Pietro da Cortona "established his reputation" with a large painting in 1625 (now Pinacoteca Capitolina, 2.17 × 4.19 m). Examples include paintings by Giovanni Francesco Romanelli and by Charles Le Brun (1647), both in the Metropolitan Museum of Art, New York. Sebastiano Ricci planned a large painting in the 1720s, but never got beyond studies. The 18th-century Venetian painter Giovanni Battista Pittoni was especially keen on the subject, painting at least nine versions of four compositions.

Most versions show Polyxena going to her death in a dignified manner, though often with her breasts bared. The sacrifice may be performed by a priest, or Neoptolemus. As in Ricci's versions, Achilles' tomb may have an equestrian statue of him above it, and Agamemnon, who opposed the killing, may be present expressing dissent. Sometimes the ghost of Achilles hovers in the air nearby.

The statue The Rape of Polyxena by Pio Fedi (1855–1865) is very prominently displayed in the Loggia dei Lanzi in Florence. The name does not refer to sexual rape, but to an earlier definition of the word derived from the Latin rapere (supine stem raptum), "to snatch, to grab, to carry off". Thus, the statue shows Polyxena's taking to be killed by Neoptolemus, despite the protests of her mother Hecuba, seated. The body on the ground, somewhat anachronistically, is either her brother Polites, or possibly Hector. In most versions, both were killed much earlier, and buried by that point in the various stories.

== On the stage ==
The story of Polyxena features in Hecuba by Euripides, Troades by Seneca and the Polyxena of Sophocles, of which only a few fragments remain. Apart from these classical dramas, there are:

- Achille et Polyxène, an opera begun by Jean-Baptiste Lully, who died from a conducting injury having only completed the first act. It was completed by his pupil Pascal Collasse, and premiered in Paris in 1687.
- Polixène, an opera by the French composer Antoine Dauvergne, first performed at the Paris Opéra on 11 January 1763
- Polyxena is also a character in Les Troyens by Hector Berlioz.
- She is mentioned by William Shakespeare in Troilus and Cressida III,3,207-215 and V,1.40-43.

== See also ==
- List of King Priam's children

== Sources ==
Ancient

- Servius. In Aeneida, iii.321.
- Seneca. Troades, 1117–1161.
- Ovid. Metamorphoses, xiii.441–480.

Modern

- Aghion I., Barbillon C., Lissarrague, F., Gods and Heroes of Classical Antiquity, Flammarion Iconographic Guides, 1996, ISBN 2080135805
- "EB": Chisholm, Hugh, ed. (1911). "Polyxena" . Encyclopædia Britannica (11th ed.). Cambridge University Press.
- Hall, James, Hall's Dictionary of Subjects and Symbols in Art, 1996 (2nd edn.), John Murray, ISBN 0719541476
- Mylonopoulos, J, "Gory Details? The Iconography of Human Sacrifice in Greek Art", Human Sacrifice in Cross-cultural perspectives and representations, eds. P Bonnechere & R. Gagne, Presses Universitaires de Lieges, 2013], pp. 61–86
