= Monument to General Manfredo Fanti, Florence =

Coordinates: 43°46′40″N 11°15′31″E

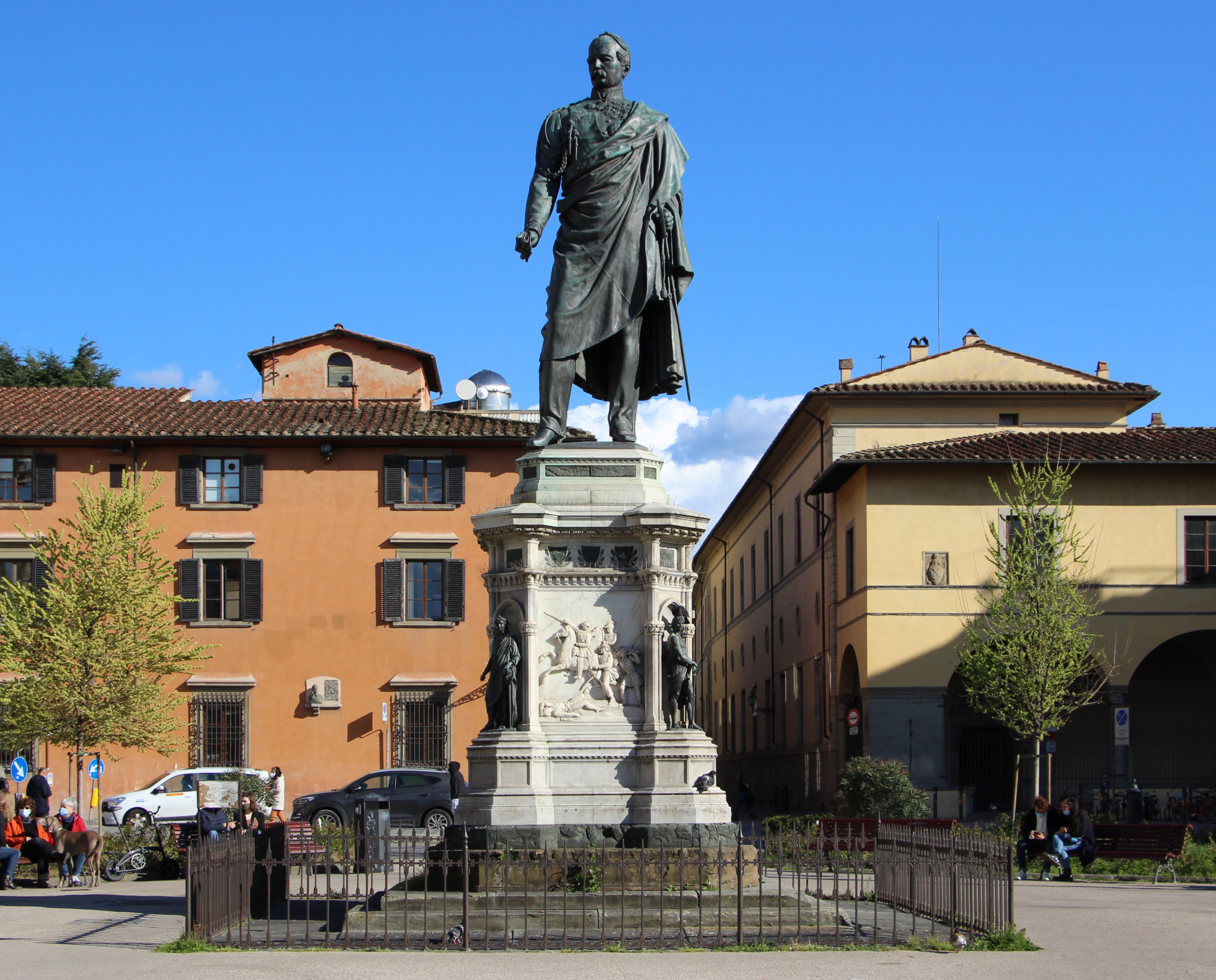
Monument in Piazza San Marco

The Monument to General Manfredo Fanti commemorates General Manfredo Fanti (1806-1865), a soldier and leader in battles for Italian independence and unification. The statue, erected in 1873, is located in the Piazza San Marco in central Florence, region of Tuscany, Italy.

After his death, the city commissioned a statue from Pio Fedi, a sculptor in Florence. The statue was erected in the piazza, which stands before the headquarters of the Royal Military Command, on the corner of via Arazzieri. The general in his cape and sword, nearly steps off the pedestal. The plinth has two marble bas-reliefs, one of the arms of war, the other an episode in the Battle of San Martino. At the four corners are four figures symbolize politics, strategy, tactics, and fortifications.

Florentines have contrasted this statue with Fedi's other masterpiece: the Rape of Polyxena (1865) in the Loggia dei Lanzi. In that group, Pyrrhus is helmeted; here however, the pacing Manfredo Fanti is shown bareheaded and balding, at the whim of elements and pigeons. Popular songs commented on this contrast.

The inscription on the marble plinth reads, Manfredo Fanti born in Carpi/ on 25 February 1806,/ for the love of liberty,/ exiled in 1831./ Learned in Spain/ the art of war/ and in the Wars of Italy/General of the armies/His bravery and sense hastened/ the independence and unity of the fatherland./ Died in Florence April 5, 1865.
