= Loggia dei Lanzi =

Historic building in Florence, Italy

Coordinates: 43°46′9.13″N 11°15′20.37″E

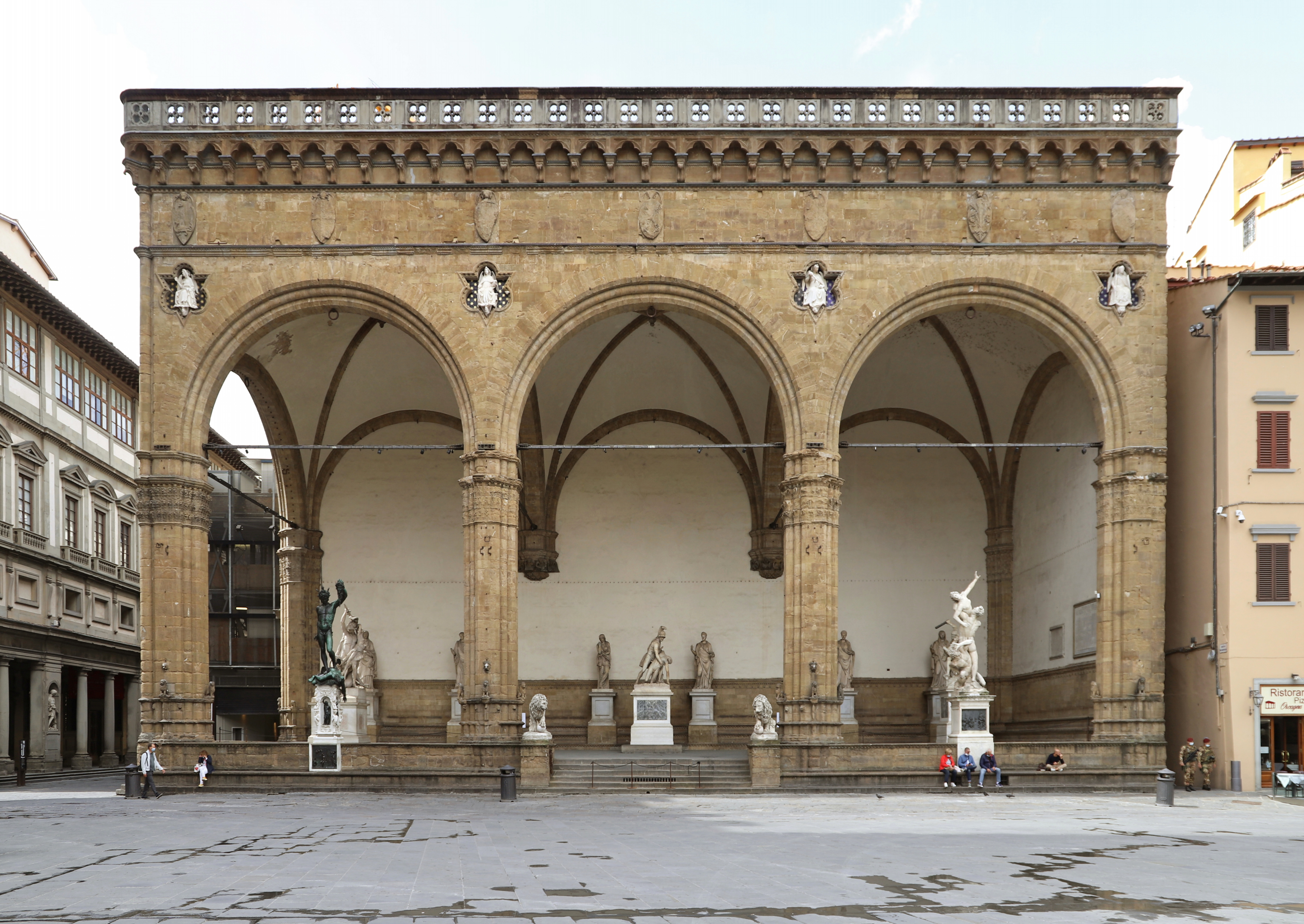
Loggia dei Lanzi

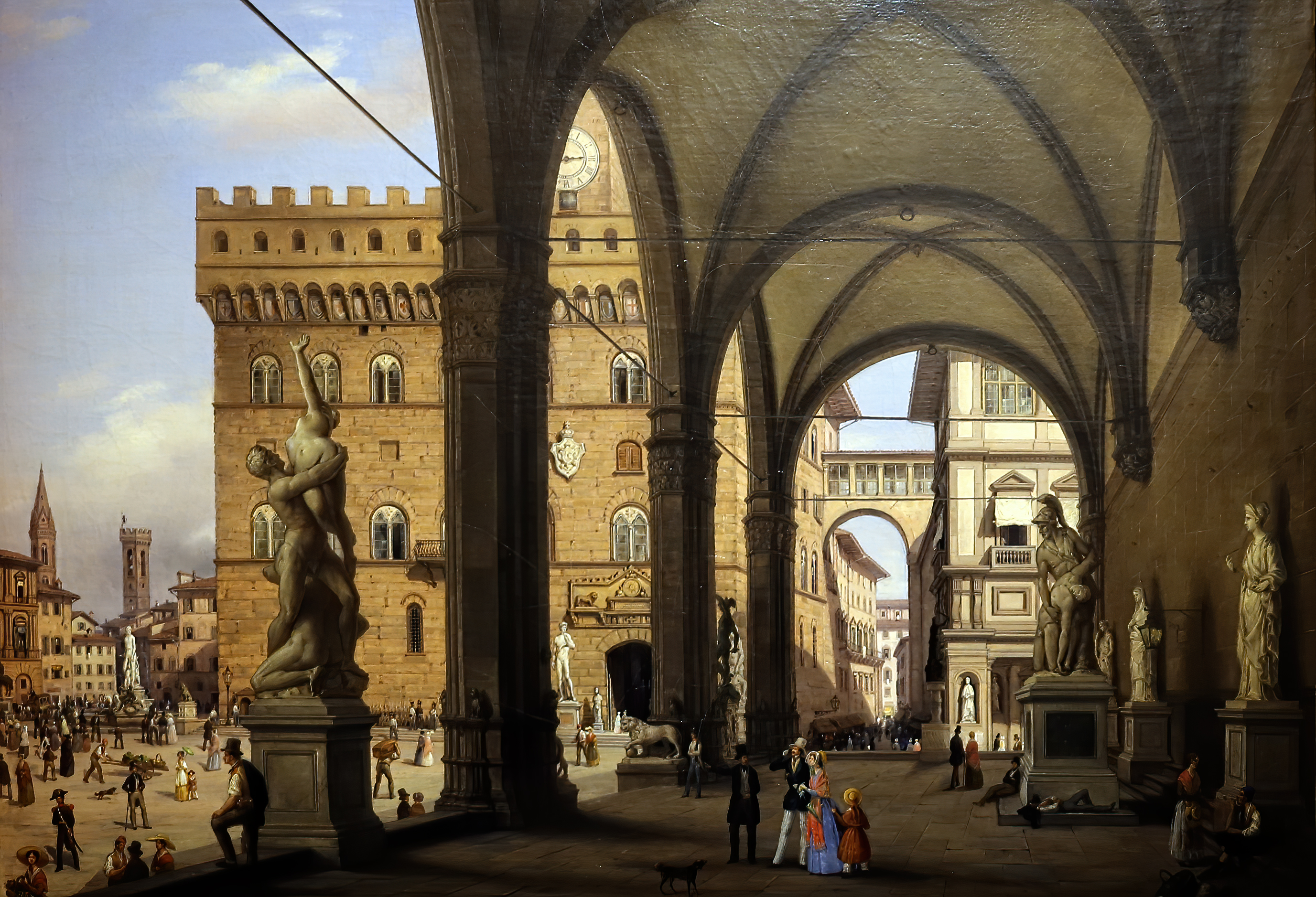
Painting of the Piazza della Signoria and Loggia dei Lanzi, 1830 by Carlo Canella

The Loggia dei Lanzi, also called the Loggia della Signoria, is a building on the south corner of the Piazza della Signoria in Florence, Italy, adjoining the Uffizi Gallery (leading to the Arno), and diagonally to the east the Palazzo della Signoria, the political center of the city. The loggia consists of three very high and wide arches open to the Piazza and on its east side to the Uffizi. The arches rest on cluster columns with Corinthian capitals. The wide arches appealed so much to the Florentines that Michelangelo proposed that they should be continued all around the Piazza della Signoria (see also Piazza Santissima Annunziata).

== History ==
Sometimes erroneously referred to as Loggia dell' Orcagna because it was once thought to be designed by that artist, it was built between 1376 and 1382 by Benci di Cione and Simone di Francesco Talenti, possibly following a design by Jacopo di Cione, to house the assemblies of the people and hold public ceremonies, such as the swearing into office of the Gonfaloniere of Justice and the Priores. Simone Talenti is also well known from his contributions to the churches of Orsanmichele and San Carlo dei Lombardi.

The vivacious construction of the Loggia is in stark contrast with the severe architecture of the Palazzo Vecchio. It is effectively an open-air sculpture gallery of antique and Renaissance art.

The name Loggia dei Lanzi dates back to the reign of Grand Duke Cosimo I, when it was used to house his formidable Landsknechts (In Italian: lanzichenecchi, corrupted to lanzi), or German mercenary pikemen. After the construction of the Uffizi at the rear of the Loggia, the Loggia's roof was modified by Bernardo Buontalenti and became a terrace from which the Medici princes could watch ceremonies in the piazza.

== Description ==
=== Architectural setting ===
Facade Trefoils with Four Virtues

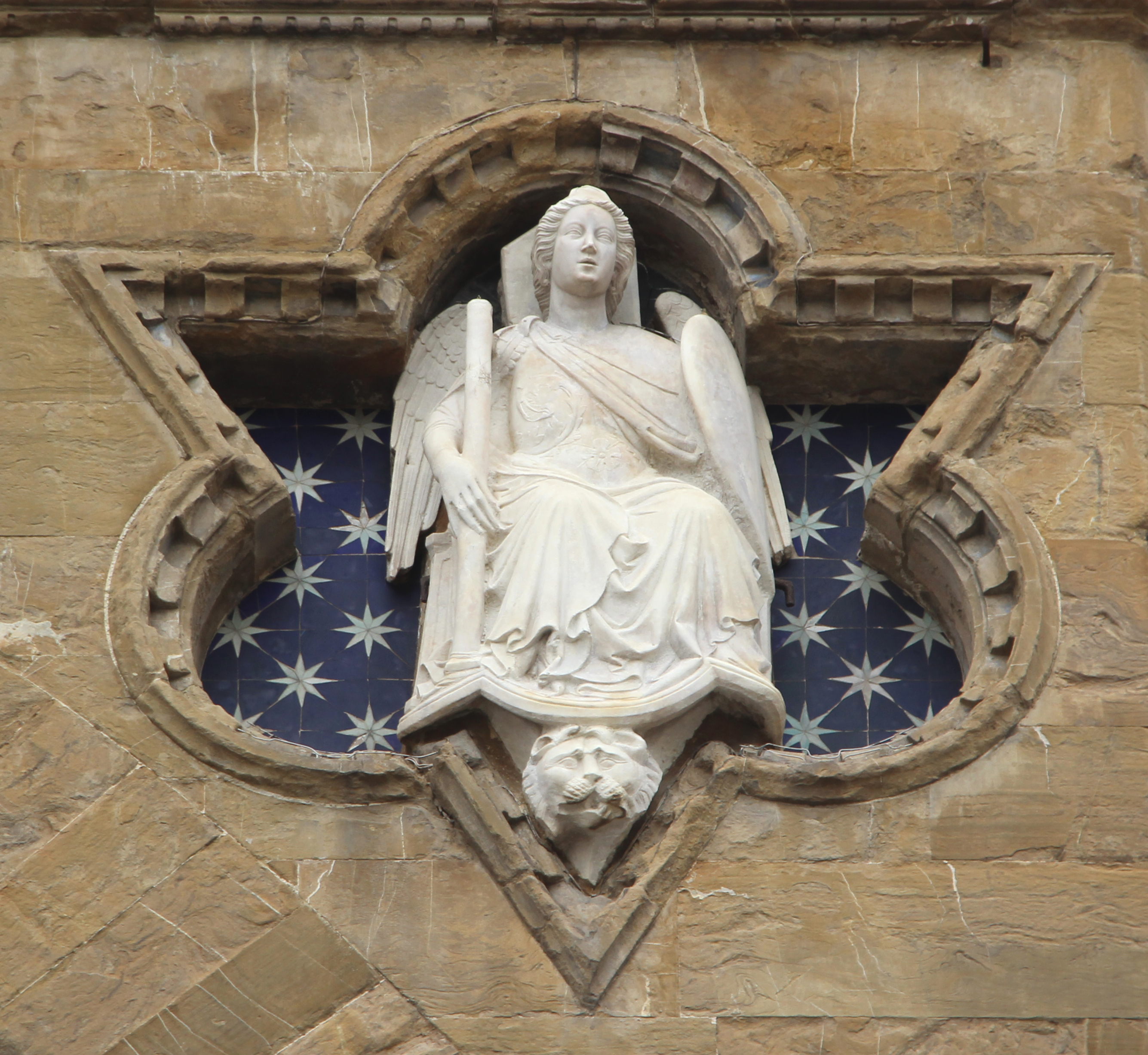
Fortitude

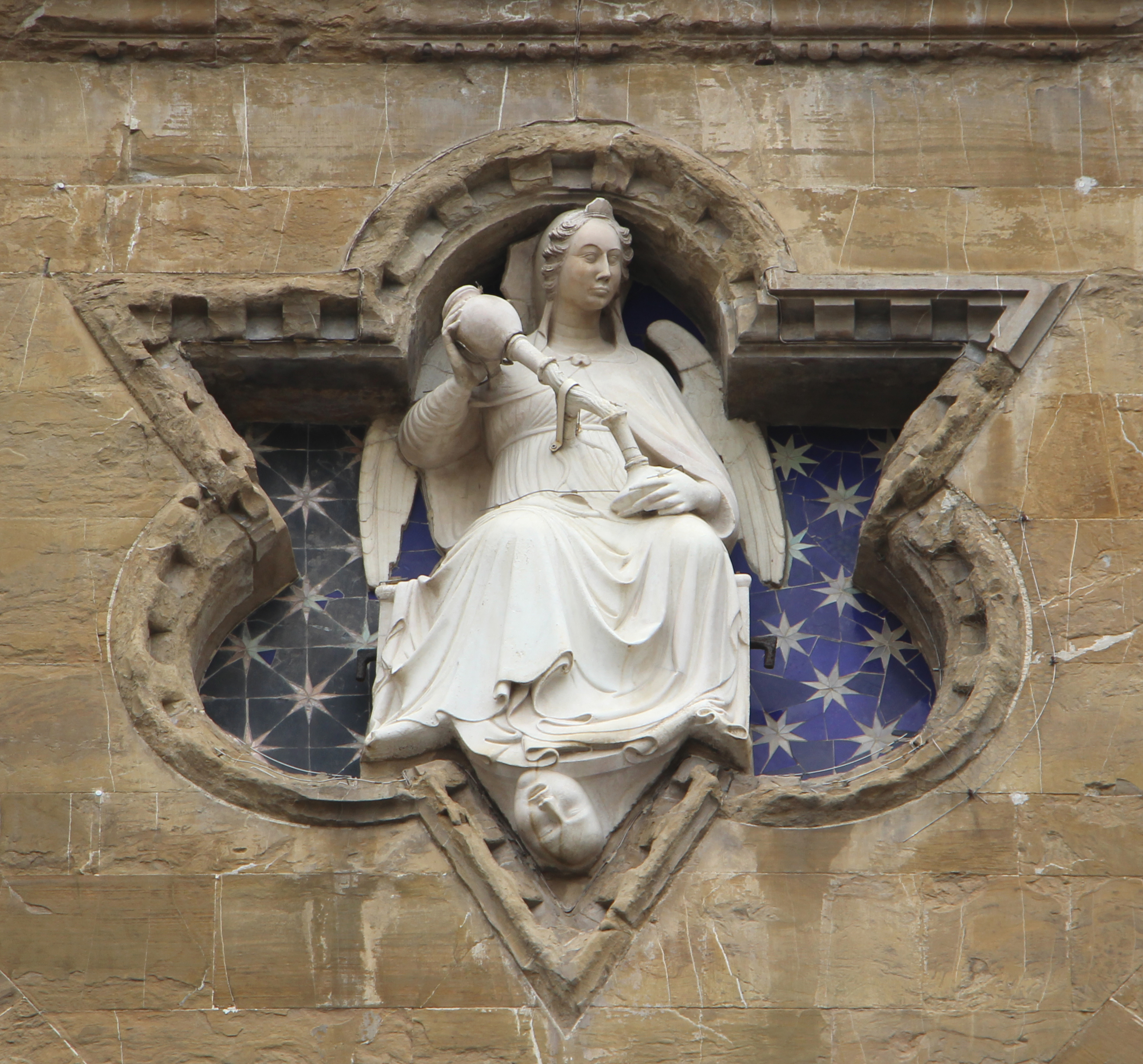
Temperance

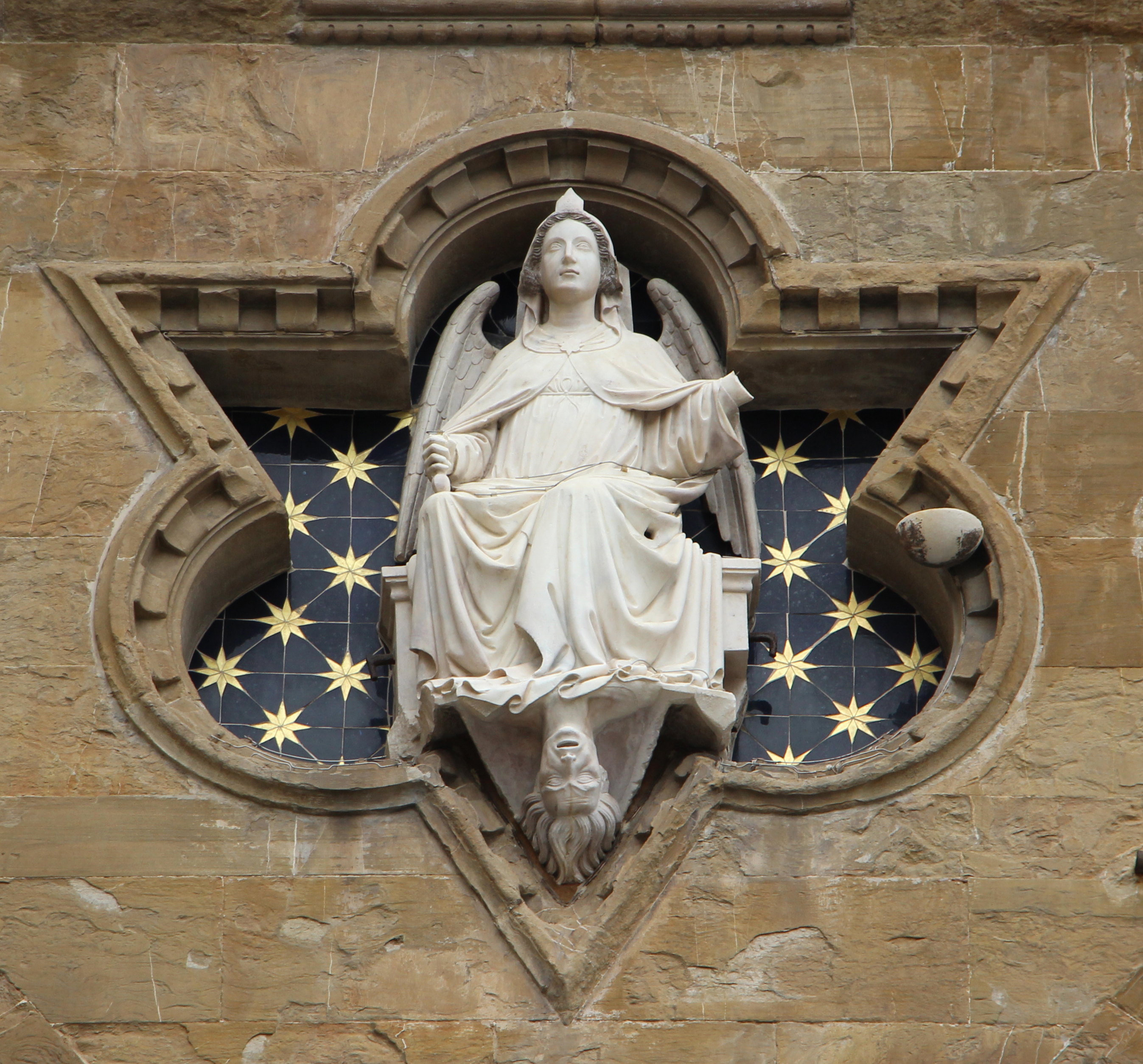
Justice

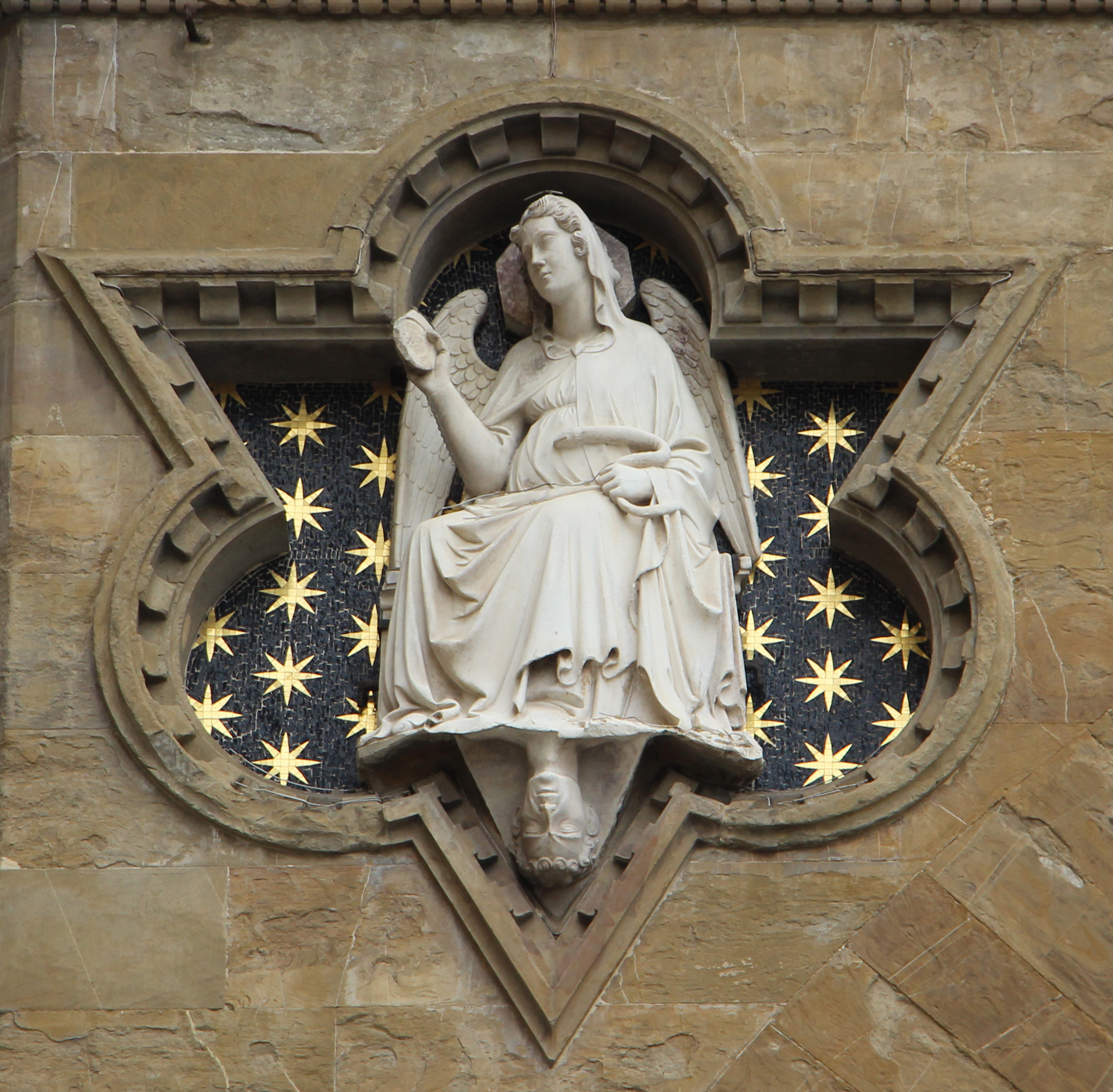
Prudence

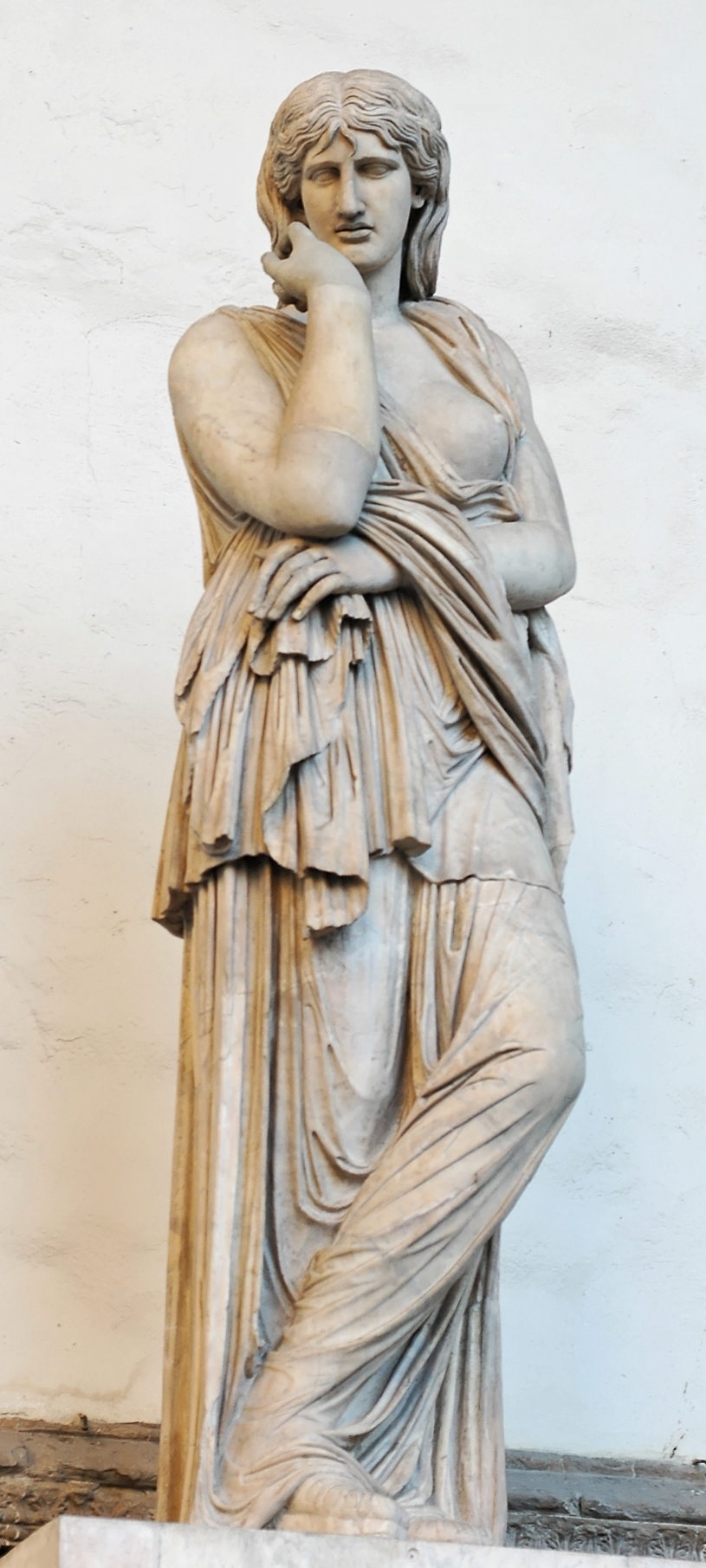
Statue of Thusnelda, the wife of the ancient Germanic warrior Arminius. Created in 2nd century AD with modern restorations.

On the façade of the Loggia, below the parapet, are trefoils with allegorical figures of the four cardinal virtues (Fortitude, Temperance, Justice and Prudence) by Agnolo Gaddi. Their blue enamelled background is the work of Leonardo, a monk, while the golden stars were painted by Lorenzo di Bicci. The vault, composed of semicircles, was done by the Florentine Antonio di Puccio Pucci.

Flanking the steps of the Loggia are the Medici Lions, a pair of marble statues of lions, heraldic symbols of Florence; The Roman original stands on the right, the complementing copy on the left was sculpted by Flaminio Vacca in 1598. They were originally placed in the Villa Medici in Rome, and found their final place in the Loggia in 1789.

On the side wall of the Loggia, there is a Latin inscription from 1750 commemorating the change of the Florentine calendar in 1749 to bring it into line with the Roman calendar. The Florentine calendar began on 25 March instead of 1 January. The other inscription from 1893 records the Florentines who distinguished themselves during the annexation of Milan (1865), Venice (1866) and Rome (1871) to the kingdom of Italy.

=== Statuary ===
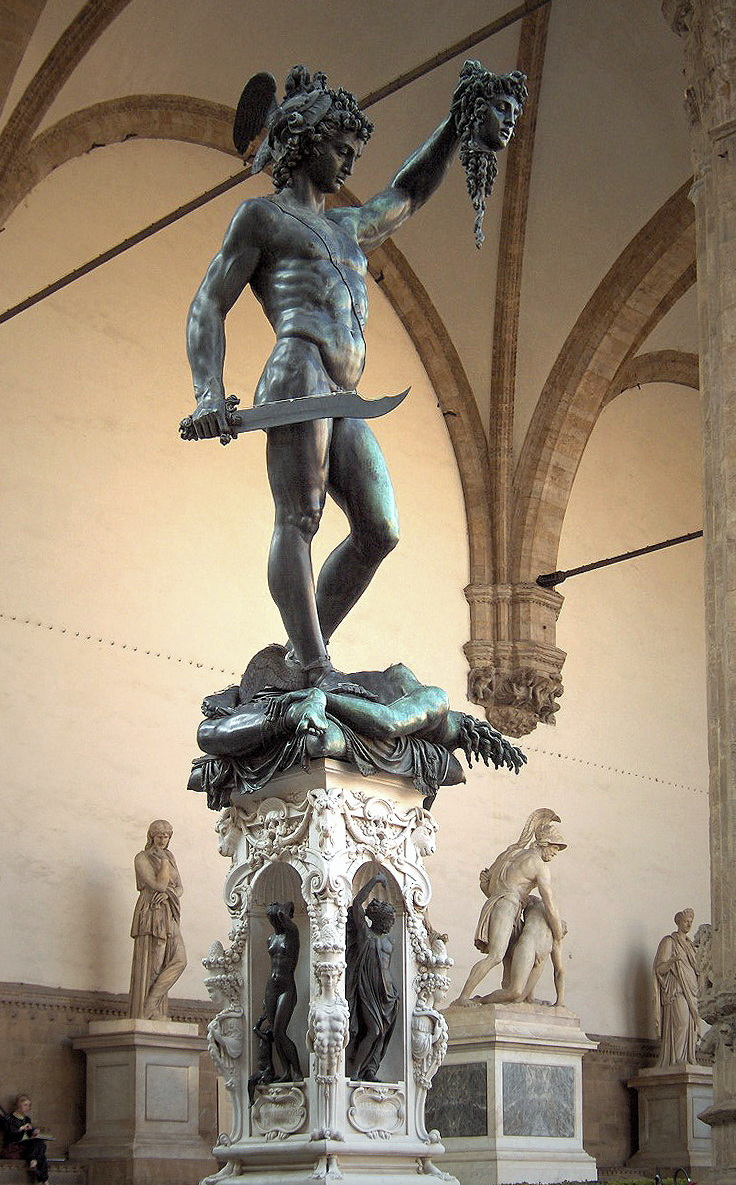
Benvenuto Cellini's Perseus with the Head of Medusa

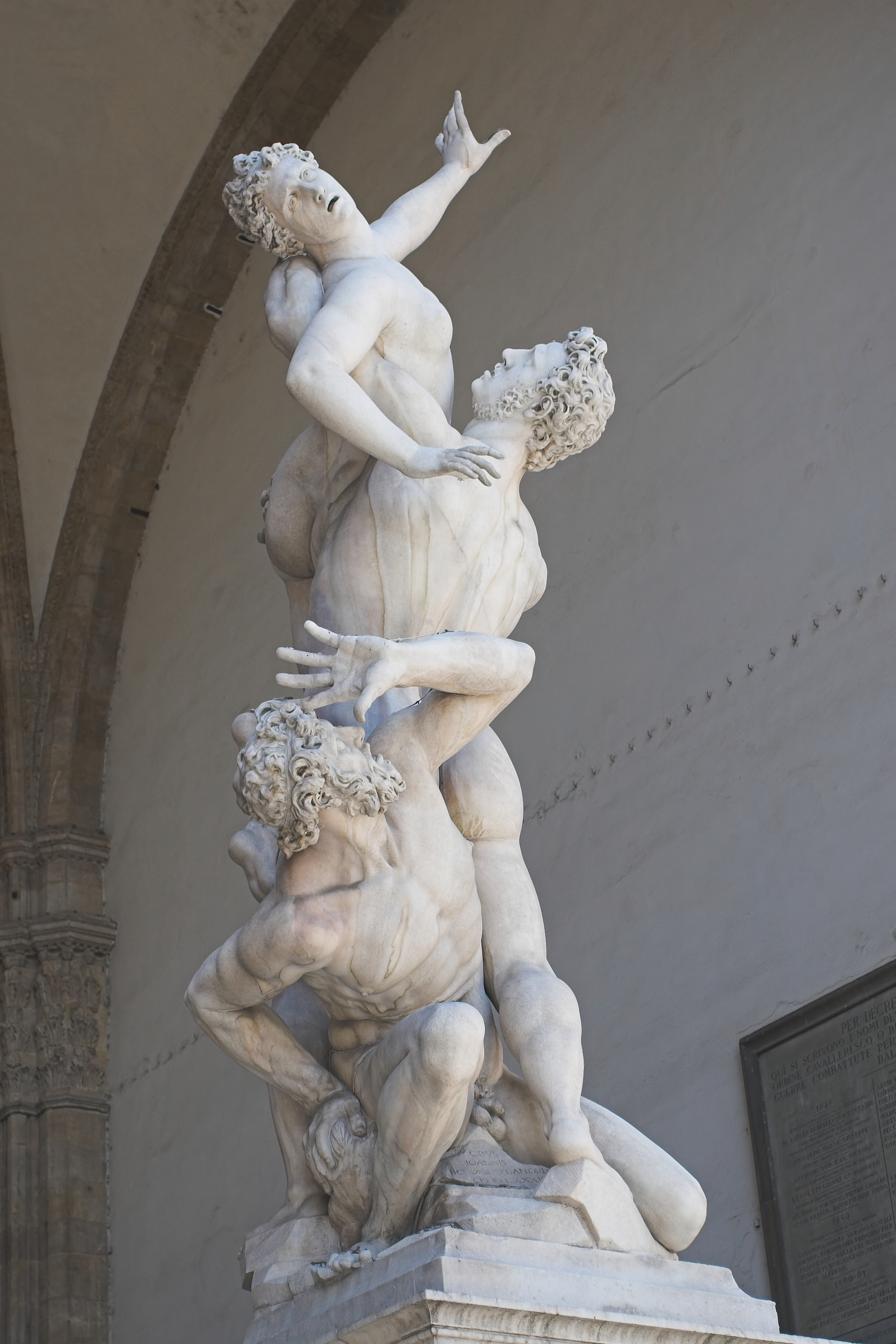
The Rape of the Sabine Women, Giambologna (1599)

Underneath the bay on the far left is the bronze statue of Perseus by Benvenuto Cellini. It shows the mythical Greek hero holding his sword in his right hand and holding up the Medusa's severed head in his left. The well-proportioned muscular body of Perseus stands poised on the right leg. Perseus is reflecting and he seems to be frightened by his same action. Blood is gushing from the head and the neck of the dead Medusa. The richly decorated marble pedestal, also by Cellini, shows four graceful bronze statuettes of Jupiter, Mercurius, Minerva and Danaë. The bas-relief on the pedestal, representing Perseus freeing Andromeda, is a copy of the one in Bargello.

Benvenuto Cellini worked almost ten years on this bronze (1545-1554). His wax design was immediately approved by Cosimo I de' Medici. He met numerous difficulties which, according to his autobiography, almost brought him to the brink of death. The casting of this bronze statue was several times unsuccessful. When attempting again, the melting furnace got overheated, spoiling the casting of the bronze. Cellini gave orders to feed the furnace with his household furniture and finally with about 200 pewter dishes and plates, and his pots and pans. This caused the bronze to flow again. After the bronze had cooled, the statue was finished, except for three toes on the right foot. These were added later.

On the far right is the manneristic group Rape of the Sabine Women by the Flemish artist Jean de Boulogne), better known by his Italianized name Giambologna. This work was made from one imperfect block of white marble, the largest block ever transported to Florence. The goccia model is now in the Galleria dell' Academia. Giambologna wanted to create a composition with the figura serpentina, an upward snakelike spiral movement to be examined from all sides. This is the first group representing more than a single figure in European sculptural history to be conceived without a dominant viewpoint. It can be equally admired from all sides. The marble pedestal, also by Giambologna, represents bronze bas-reliefs with the same theme. This marble and bronze group is in the Loggia since 1583.

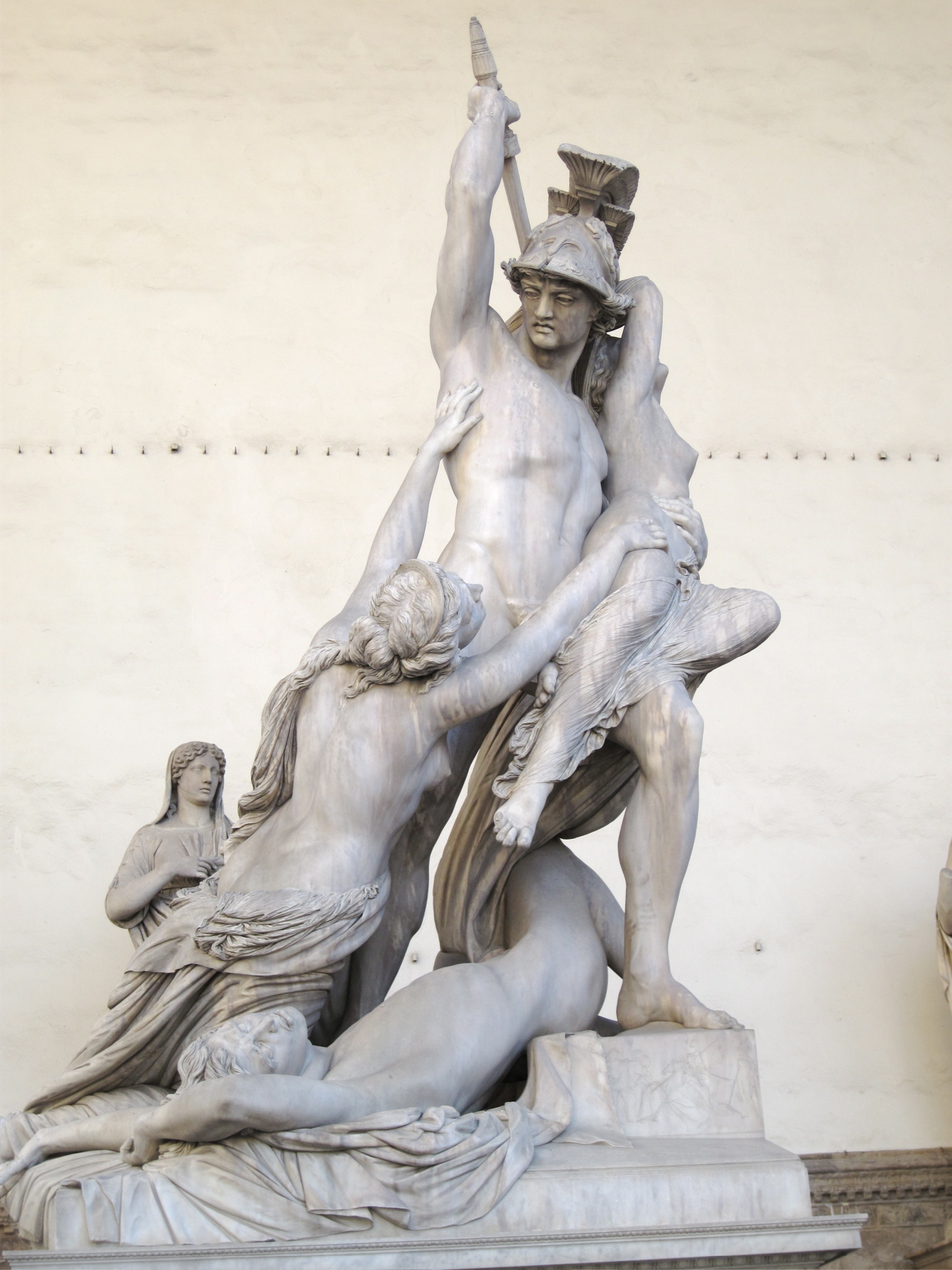
The Rape of Polyxena by Pio Fedi (1855–65)

The group The Rape of Polyxena, is a fine diagonally composed sculpture by Pio Fedi from 1865.

Nearby is Giambologna's less celebrated marble sculpture Hercules and Centaur (1599) and placed here in 1841 from the Canto de' Carnesecchi. It was sculpted from one solid block of white marble with the help of Pietro Francavilla.

The sculptural group Menelaus supporting the body of Patroclus that was discovered in Rome was originally placed at the southern end of the Ponte Vecchio. It is an ancient Roman sculpture from the Flavian era, copied from a Hellenistic Pergamene original of the mid third century BC. This marble group was discovered in Rome. It has undergone restorations by Ludovico Salvetti, to a model by Pietro Tacca (1640) and by Stefano Ricci (about 1830). There is a copy of the sculpture in the Palazzo Pitti.

On the back of the Loggia are five marble female statues (three are identified as Matidia, Marciana and Agrippina Minor), Sabines and a statue of a Barbarian prisoner Thusnelda from Roman times from the era of Trajan to Hadrian. They were discovered in Rome in 1541. The statues had been in the Medici villa at Rome since 1584 and were brought here by Pietro Leopoldo in 1789. They all have significant, modern restorations.

The Feldherrnhalle in Munich, commissioned by King Ludwig I of Bavaria to honor the tradition of his military, was modelled after the Loggia dei Lanzi.

== Gallery ==
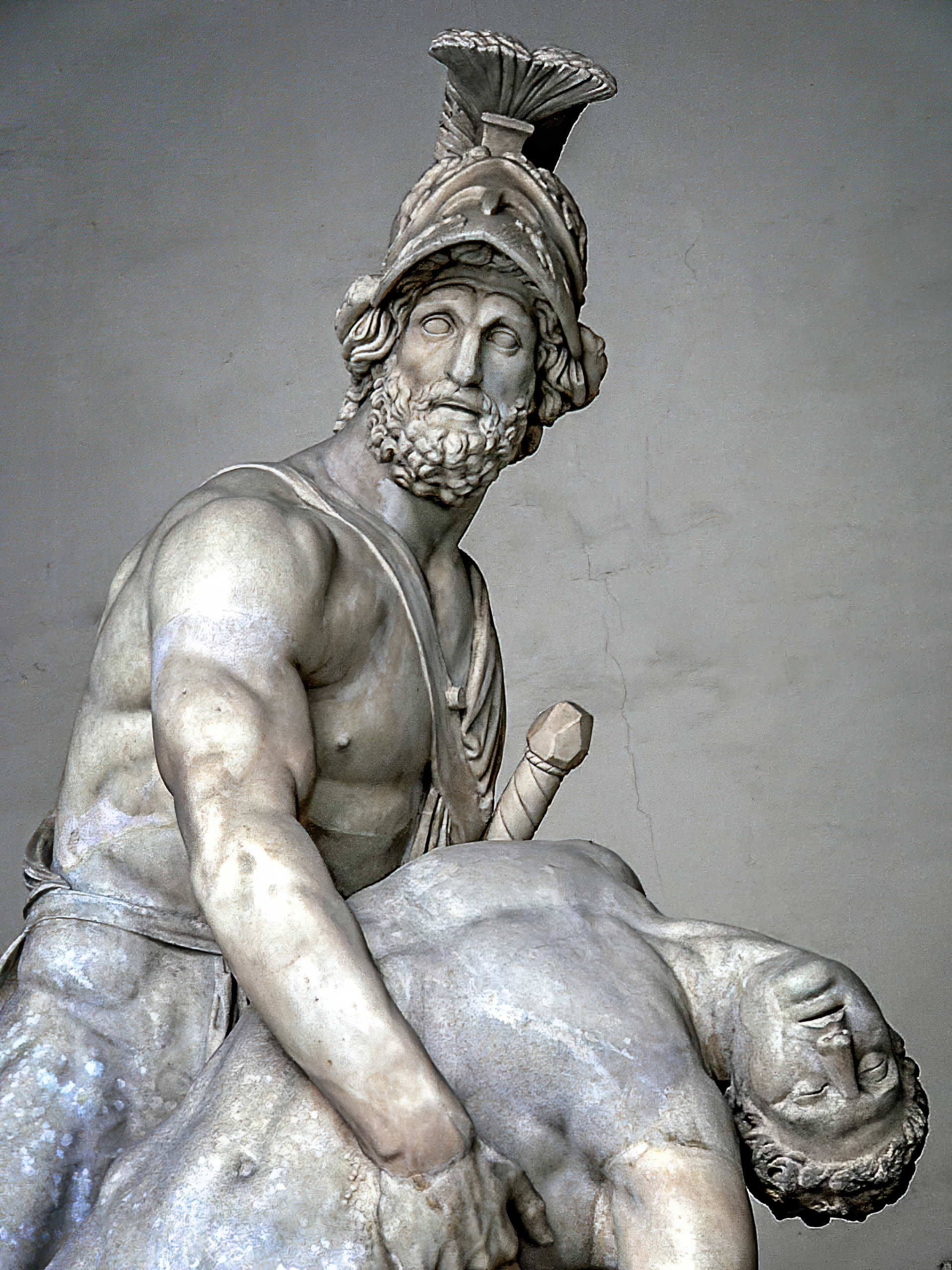
Ajax Bearing the Corpse of Achilles, Flavian Era, 1st ct.

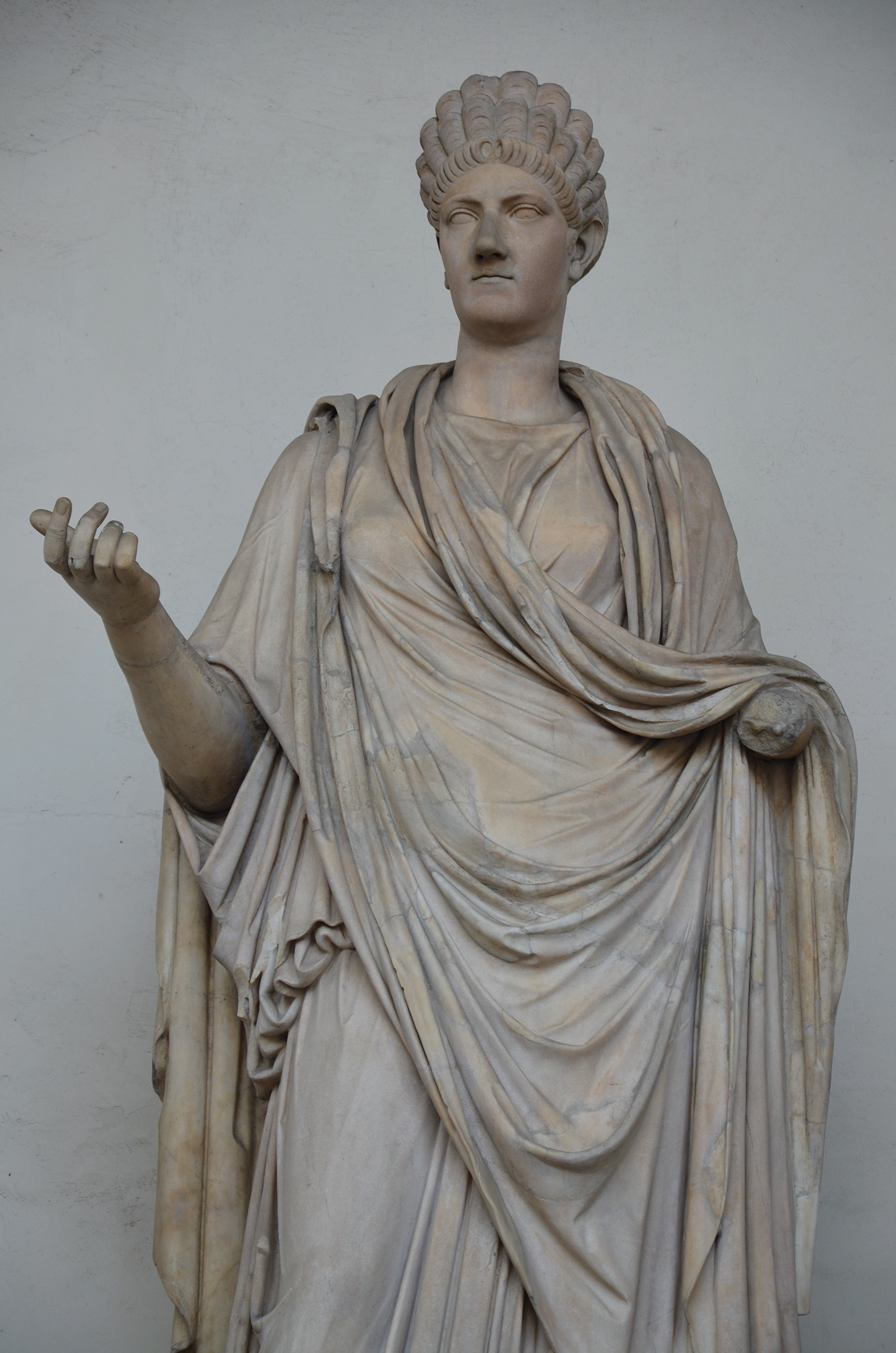
Ulpia Marciana, 110–120 (with modern additions)

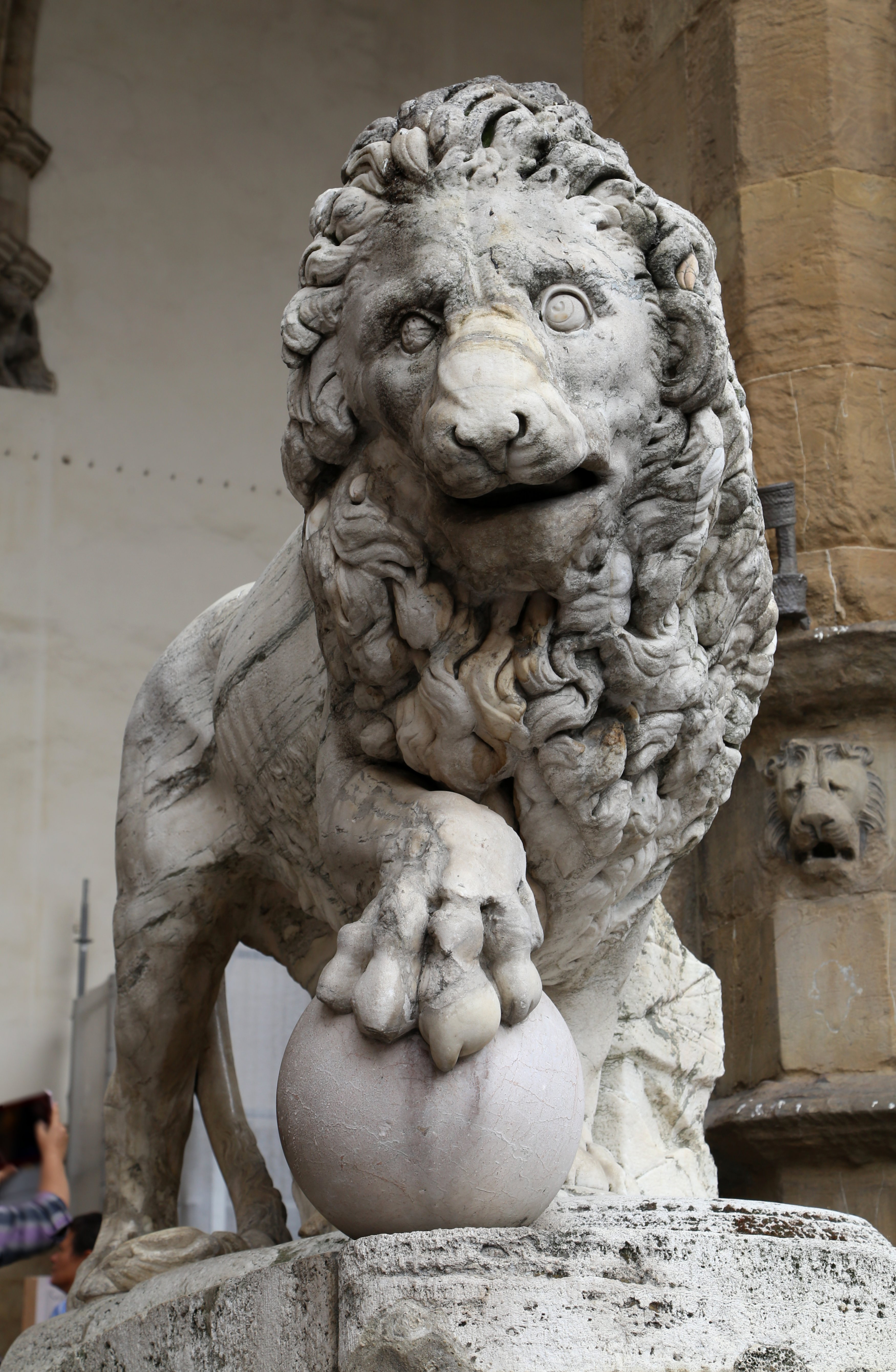
Medici Lion, 2nd-century Roman original relief, retrofitted by Fancelli

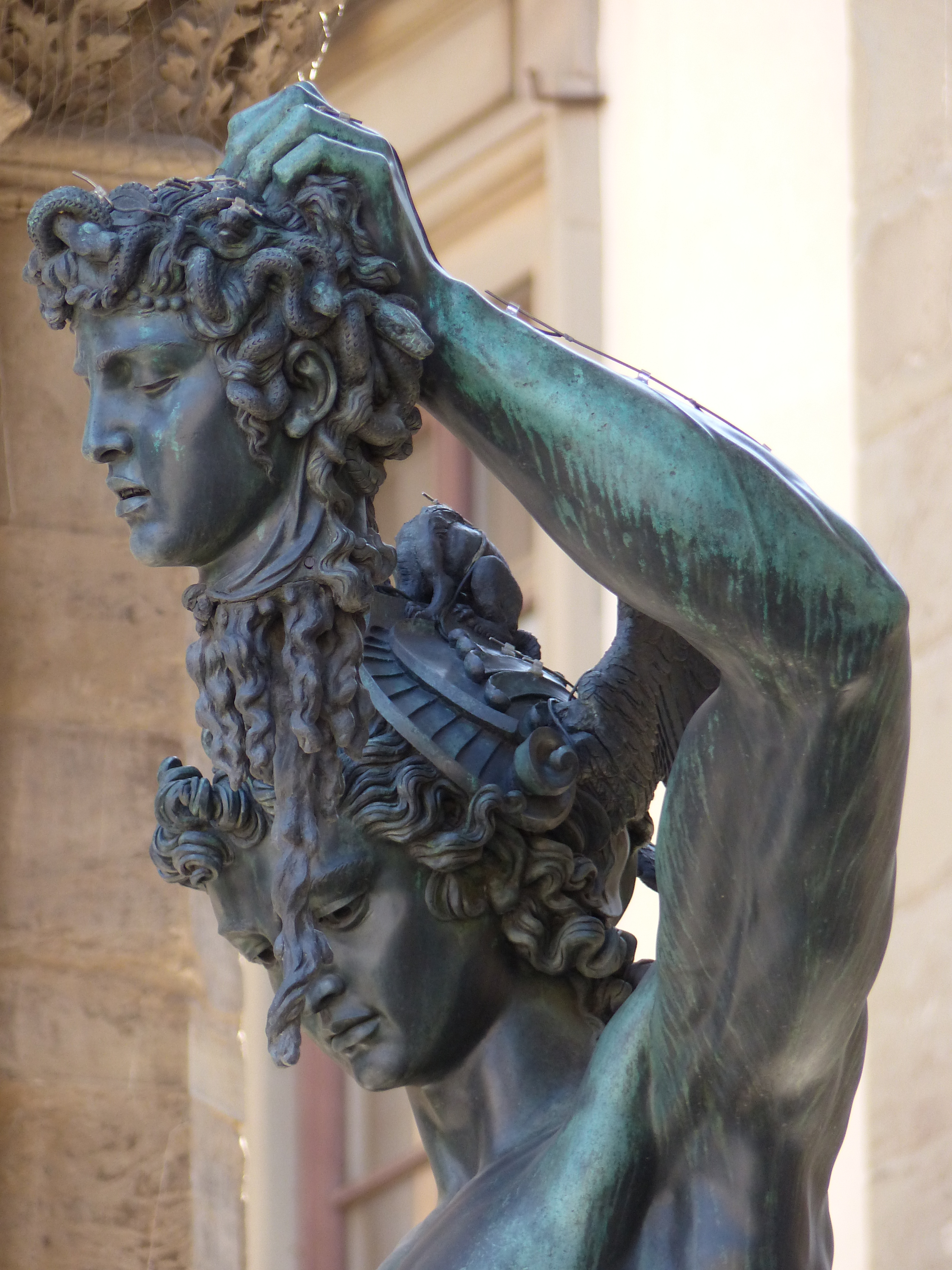
Perseus with the Head of Medusa by Benvenuto Cellini (1545)

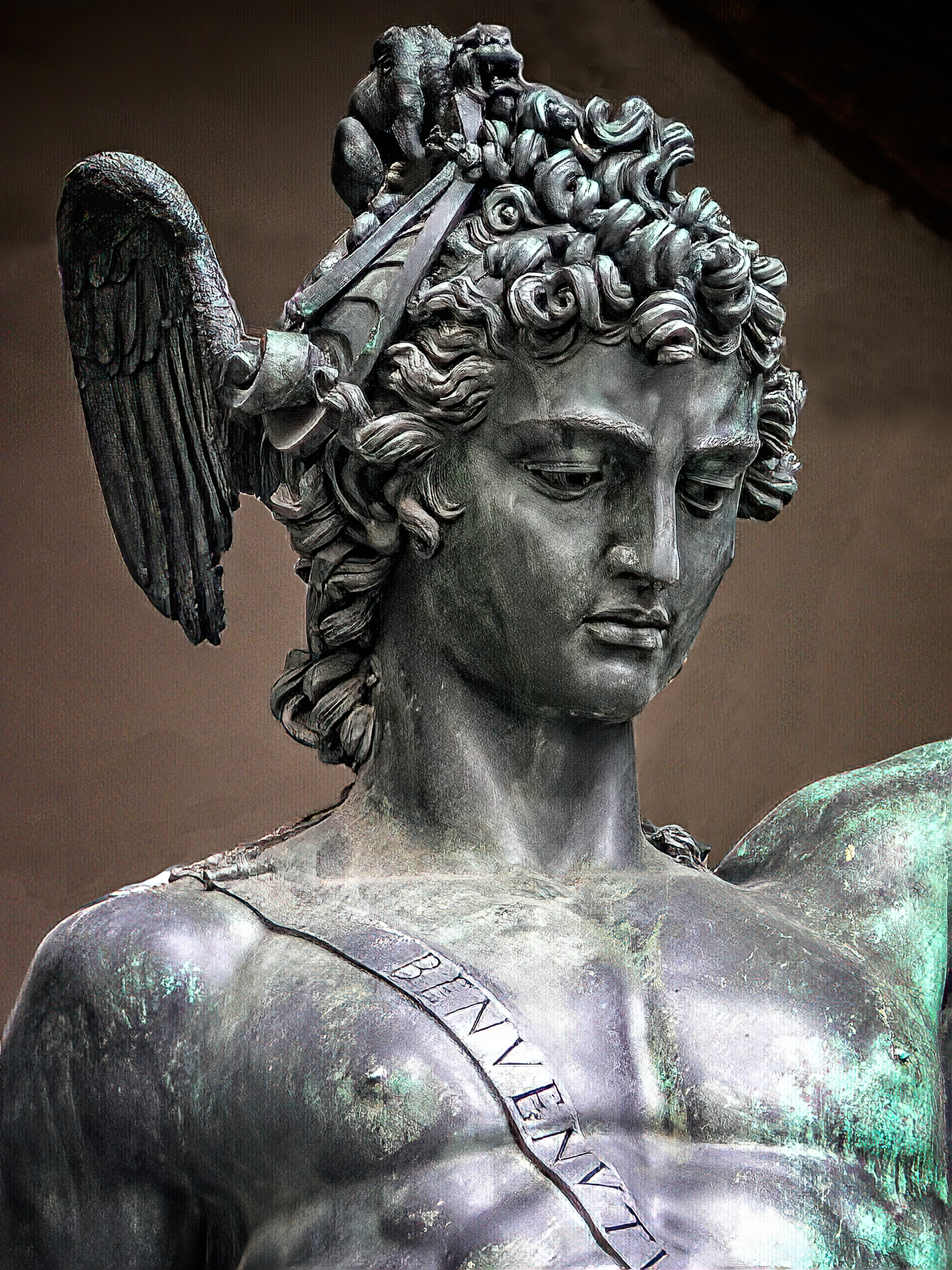
The Head of Cellini's Perseus

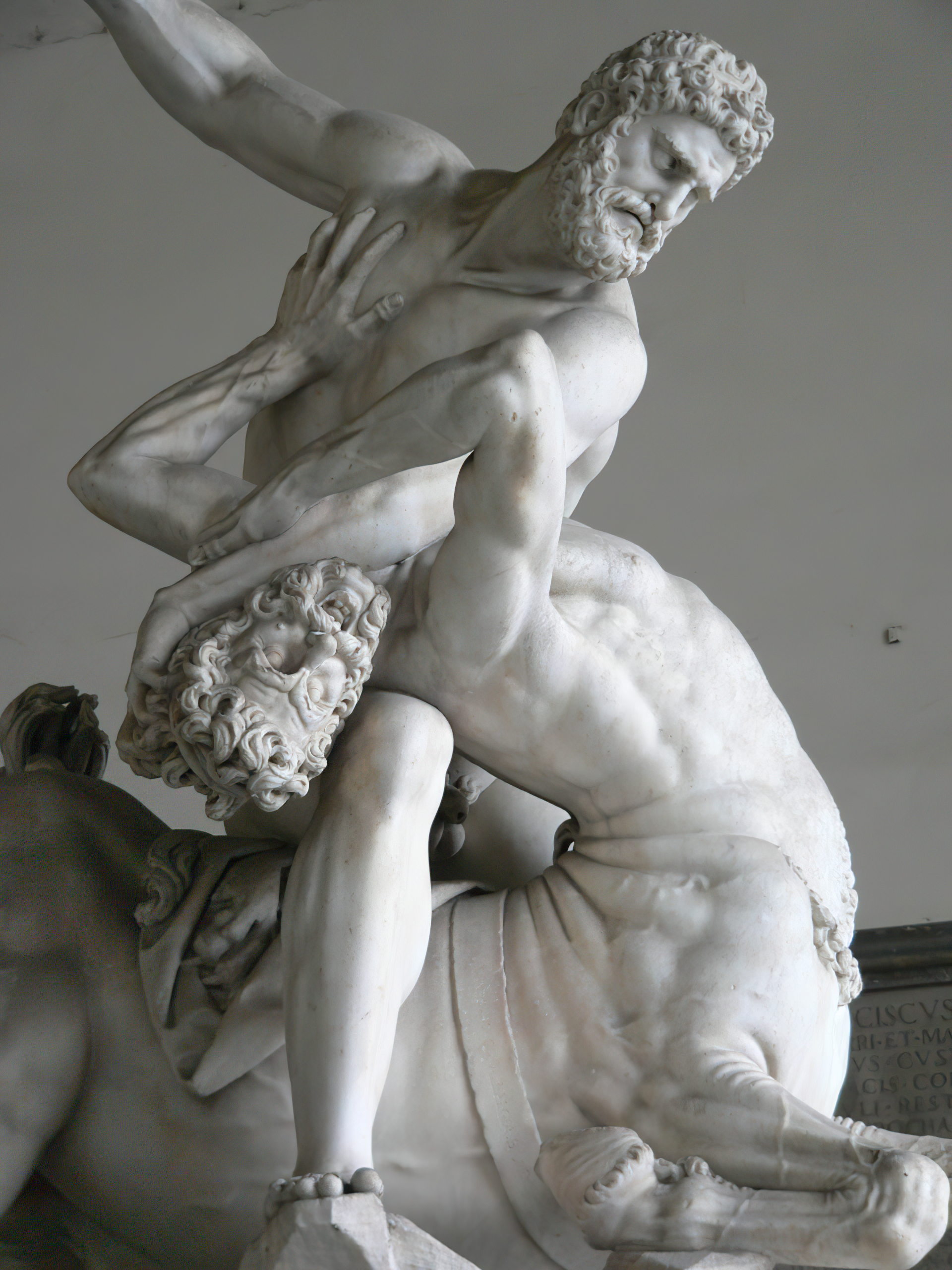
Hercules and Nessus by Giambologna (1599)

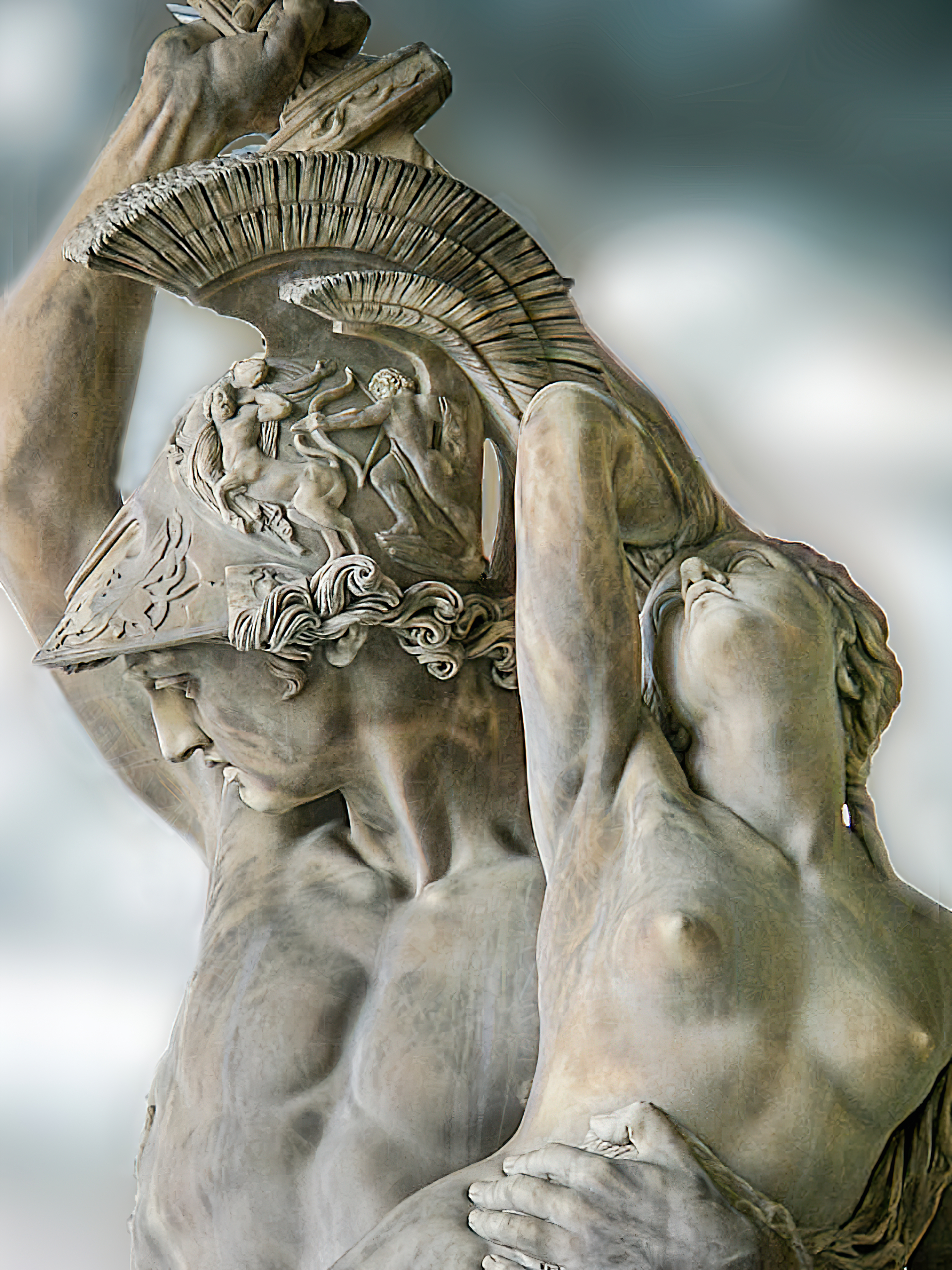
Rape of Polyxena by Pio Fedi (1855–65)
