= Manfredo Pietrantonio =

Italian footballer

Personal information
- Date of birth: 4 May 1998 (age 28)
- Place of birth: Pescara, Italy
- Height: 1.80 m (5 ft 11 in)
- Position: Defender

Team information
- Current team: Notaresco

Youth career
- –2015: Pescara

Senior career*
Years	Team	Apps	(Gls)
2015–2018	Pescara	0	(0)
2015–2016	→ Chieti (loan)	15	(0)
2016–2017	→ L'Aquila (loan)	23	(0)
2017–2018	→ Teramo (loan)	11	(0)
2018–2019	Pineto	24	(0)
2019–2020	Sambuceto		
2020–2021	Spoltore		
2021–2022	Chieti		
2022–2023	Albalonga	19	(2)
2023–	Notaresco	15	(1)
- * Club domestic league appearances and goals as of 00:33, 10 March 2024 (UTC)

Manfredo Pietrantonio (born 4 May 1998) is an Italian football player who plays for Serie D club Notaresco.

== Club career ==
He made his Serie C debut for Teramo on 27 August 2017 in a game against Mestre.

In November 2019, Pietrantonio joined ASD Sambuceto Calcio.
