= Euclide Trotti =

Italian painter

Euclide Trotti was an Italian painter of the Renaissance period. He was born in Cremona and lived in the 16th century. He was the nephew and pupil of Giovanni Battista Trotti. He painted for the church of San Sigismondo at Cremona. An Ascension in S. Antonio at Milan is also attributed to him. He died young in prison, where he was confined on a charge of high treason.
