= Piazza San Marco, Florence =

City square in Florence

Piazza San Marco
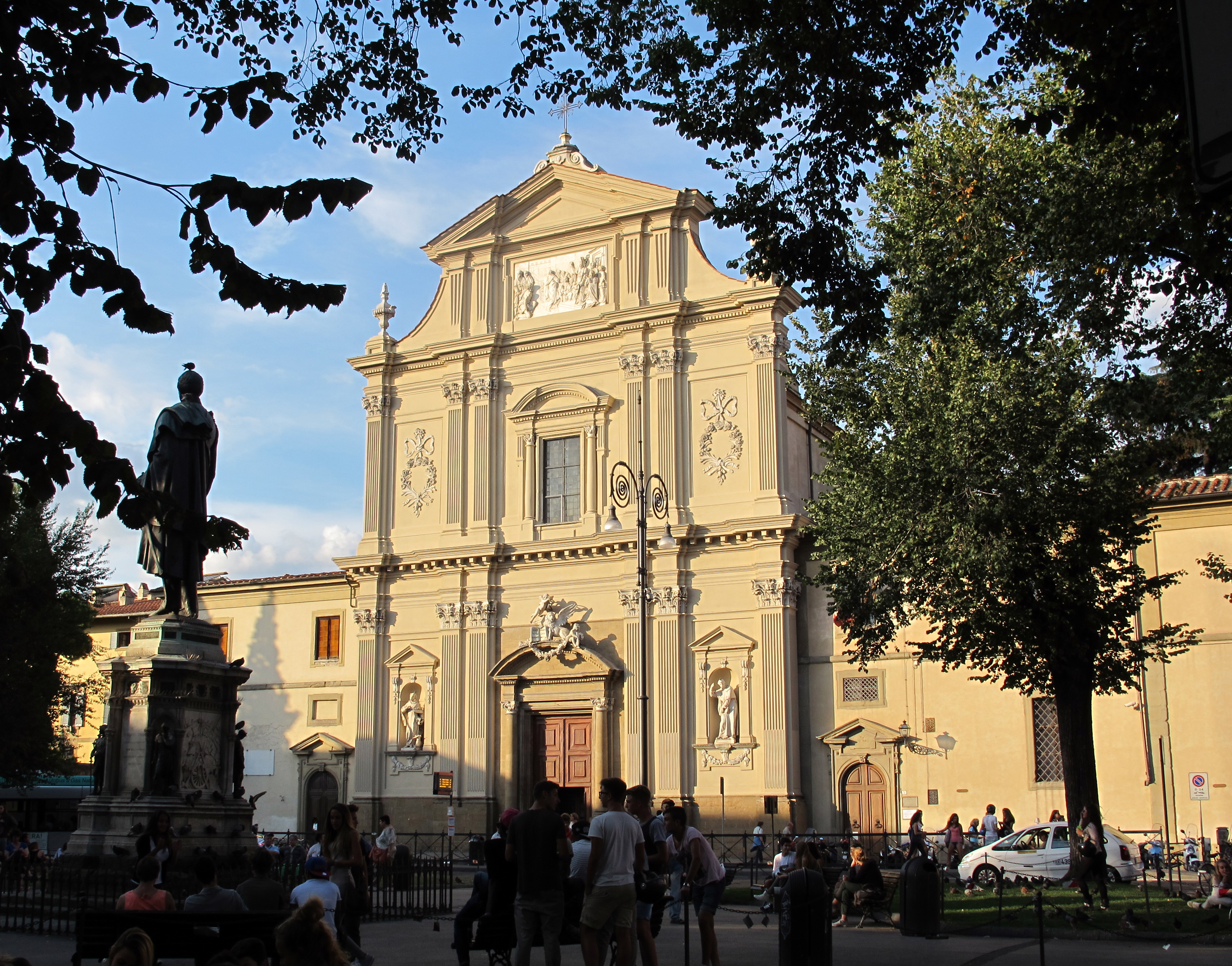
- Piazza San Marco with the church with the same name
- Quarter: Historical centre
- Coordinates: 43°46′40.44″N 11°15′31.32″E

Piazza San Marco is a city square in Florence, Italy. In the center of the piazza is the Monument to Generale Manfredo Fanti.

== Buildings around the square ==
- Museo Nazionale di San Marco
- Basilica di San Marco (Florence)
- Accademia di Belle Arti di Firenze
- Palazzina della Livia
- Bernardo Fallani
