= Sandro Trotti =

Italian painter (born 1934)

- Born: 1934 (age 91–92); Monte Urano, Marche, Italy

Sandro Trotti (born 1934) is a contemporary Italian painter. In 1972 Trotti became professor of Painting at the Accademia di Belle Arti in Rome, where he taught until 2000. He holds teaching posts in Peking and in Canton, in the People's Republic of China.

== Early life ==
Trotti was born at Monte Urano, in the Marche region of central Italy, in 1934. He moved to Rome, where he became friend with other Italian important Masters as Luigi Montanarini, Domenico Purificato, Pericle Fazzini, Sante Monachesi and Corrado Cagli.

== Career ==
His first personal exhibition has been held in 1954 in Porto San Giorgio.

During the '60s Trotti's pictorial research is directed towards abstractionism and experimentations on glass and plastic materials: Cellophane, Cartesian Axes, Rice Beans, Televisions and Crates.

In the '70s Trotti develops a more figurative painting, which does not leave out the geometric shapes and realizes the famous series of "White Nudes" and portraits of the Japanese Yoko.

Since 1970 he has traveled abroad and in 1973 he exhibited in Syria, at the Urnina Gallery in Damascus.

He has traveled to Thailand and India, Egypt and the Middle East, thus enriching his pictorial research with new subjects and new suggestions (Buddhas and portraits of oriental women, a theme that returns throughout his career).

The portraits, the nudes of women, the landscapes of Rome and the Marche hills are pictorial themes constantly present in the art of Trotti.

Reputed among the greatest European figurative painters, his works have been shown in several exhibitions in Italy and abroad: in 1977, personal exhibition at the Galleria Vittoria in Rome on the theme of geraniums, with a presentation by Costanzo Costantini and Ferruccio Ulivi; in 1982, an anthological exhibition at the Palazzo Bosdari in Ancona, presented by Franco Solmi; in 1985, a major anthological exhibition at the Palazzo dei Diamanti in Ferrara, curated by Franco Farina and Carmine Benincasa and a group exhibition at the Museum of Philadelphia, together with other important Italian masters.

In 1986 the Museum of Sao Paulo (Brazil) hosts an exhibition on Trotti's abstract works.

In 1992 an exhibition in St. Petersburg, where he meets many artists and writers including the writer Vladimir Asimov, who will write an essay on his painting.

In the same year, a successful anthological exhibition in the Monumental Complex of San Michele a Ripa in Rome with a presentation by Carmine Benincasa.

Parallel to the pictorial activity Trotti also carries on the graphic design by making many etchings.

In 1998 an anthological exhibition in Ascoli Piceno and Monte Urano, with the presentation of Claudio Strinati.

In 1999 Trotti was invited to China, and exhibited in Canton, Peking and Shanghai. In 2007 he had another large exhibition in Shanghai, and was appointed professor of history of art at the China Central Academy of Fine Arts in Peking and at the Guangzhou Academy of Fine Arts in Canton.

In 2008 an important exhibition has been held at the Goza Gallery in Bratislava.

A retrospective exhibition of his work has been held at Civitanova Marche in the province of Macerata in the winter of 2010–2011.

In 2010 he was between few living painters to participate in "Romaccademia - a century of art from Sartorio to Scialoja", an exhibition held at the Vittoriano complex in Rome in honor of the great masters of the Academy of Fine Arts in Rome.

From 1984 his self-portrait figures permanently in the Vasari corridor of the Uffizi in Florence.

Over one hundred works by Sandro Trotti, donated by the artist to the Town of Fermo (Marche, Italy), will constitute a museum fund at the "Palazzo dei Priori".
