= Polyxena (disambiguation) =

Polyxena was a Trojan princess at the time of the Trojan War.

Polyxena can also refer to:

== People ==
- Polyxena, the original name of the mother of Alexander the Great
- Polyxena, a 1st-century Christian saint, see Acts of Xanthippe, Polyxena, and Rebecca
- Polyxena of Hesse-Rotenburg, queen consort of Sardinia, mother of King Victor Amadeus III of Sardinia
- Polyxena of Lobkowicz, a Czech noblewoman
- Henrietta Polyxena of Vasaborg, a Swedish countess
- Polissena Contarini Da Mula, dogaressa of Venice
- Polissena Ruffo (1400-1420), an Italian noblewoman
- Polissena Sforza (1428-1449), an Italian noblewoman
- Polissena of San Macario (d. 1571), an Italian woman accused of witchcraft

== Creative works ==
- Polyxena sarcophagus, a classical work of art
- The Sacrifice of Polyxena (Charles Le Brun), a painting
- The Sacrifice of Polyxena (Giovanni Francesco Romanelli), a painting
- Polyxène et Pirrhus, an opera

== Scientific ==
- Acmosara polyxena a species of moth
- Paranerita polyxena, a species of moth
- Pseudocatharylla polyxena, a species of moth
- Zerynthia polyxena, a species of butterfly
- Polyxena, a synonym of Cordyla a genus of gnat
- Polyxena, a synonym of Lachenalia a plant genus
- 595 Polyxena, an asteroid
