= Charles Le Brun =

French painter and art theorist (1619–1690)

- Charles Le Brun, portrait by Nicolas de Largillière
- Born: Paris, Kingdom of France
- Baptised: 24 February 1619
- Died: 22 February 1690 (aged 70); Paris, Kingdom of France

Director of the Académie de Peinture et de Sculpture
- In office 1683–1690
- Monarch: Louis XIV
- Preceded by: Charles Errard
- Succeeded by: Pierre Mignard

Charles Le Brun (French pronunciation: [ʃaʁl lə bʁœ̃]; baptised 24 February 1619 – 12 February 1690) was a French painter, physiognomist, art theorist, and a director of several art schools of his time. He served as a court painter to Louis XIV, who declared him "the greatest French artist of all time". Le Brun was a dominant figure in 17th-century French art and was influenced by Nicolas Poussin.

== Biography ==
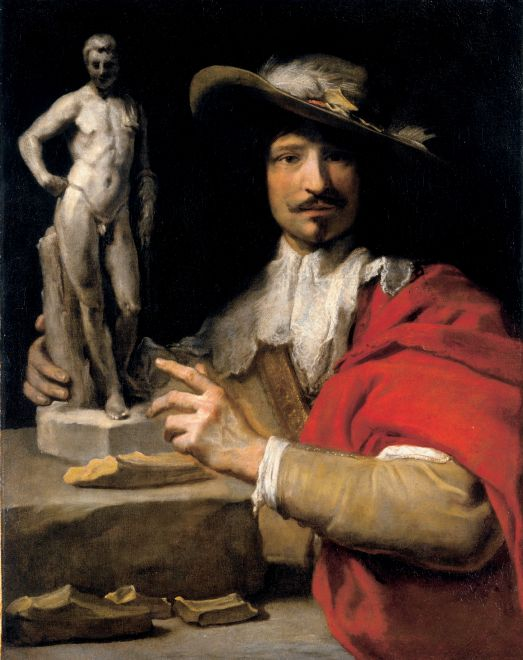
Portrait of Nicolas Le Brun by Charles Le Brun, c. 1635, Residenzgalerie, Salzburg

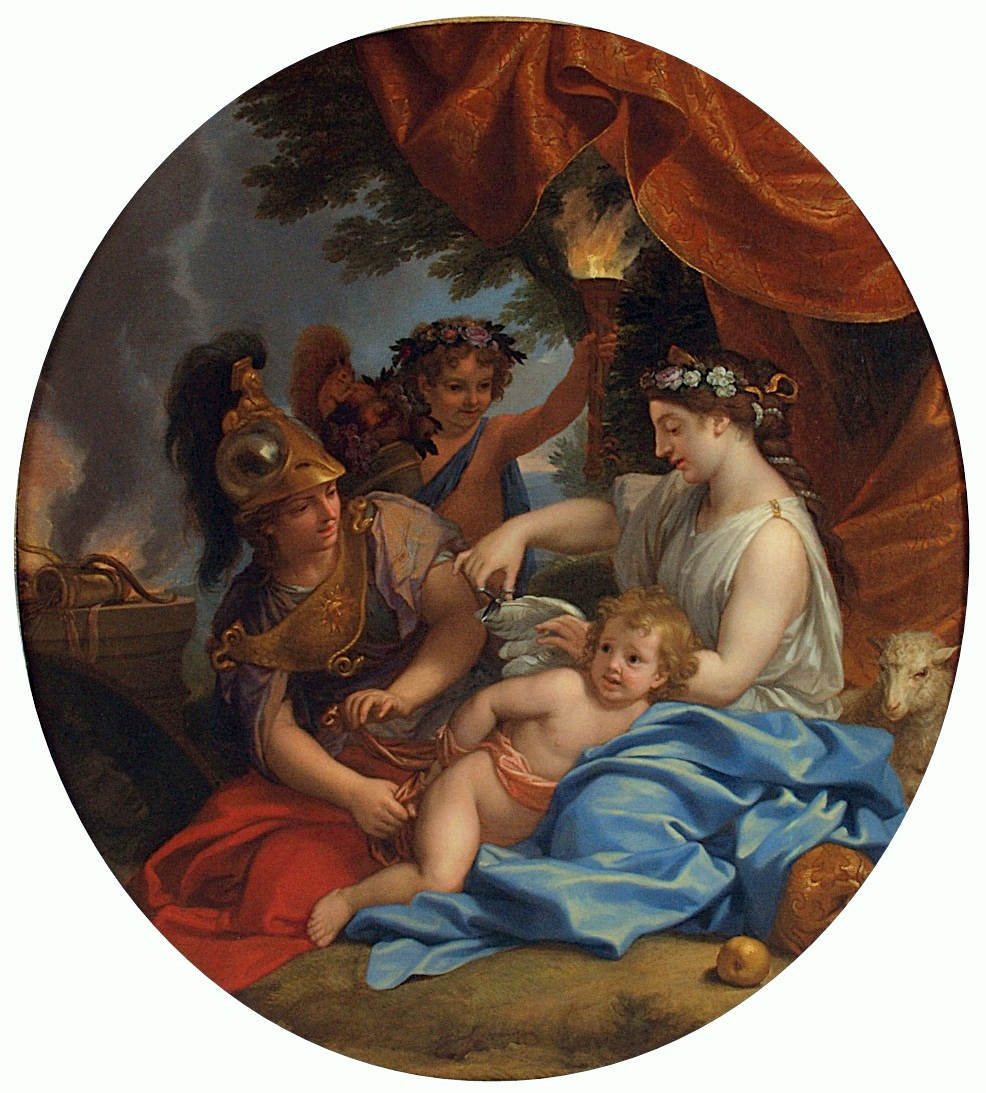
Venus Clipping Cupid's Wings, c. 1655, Museo de Arte de Ponce, Ponce, Puerto Rico

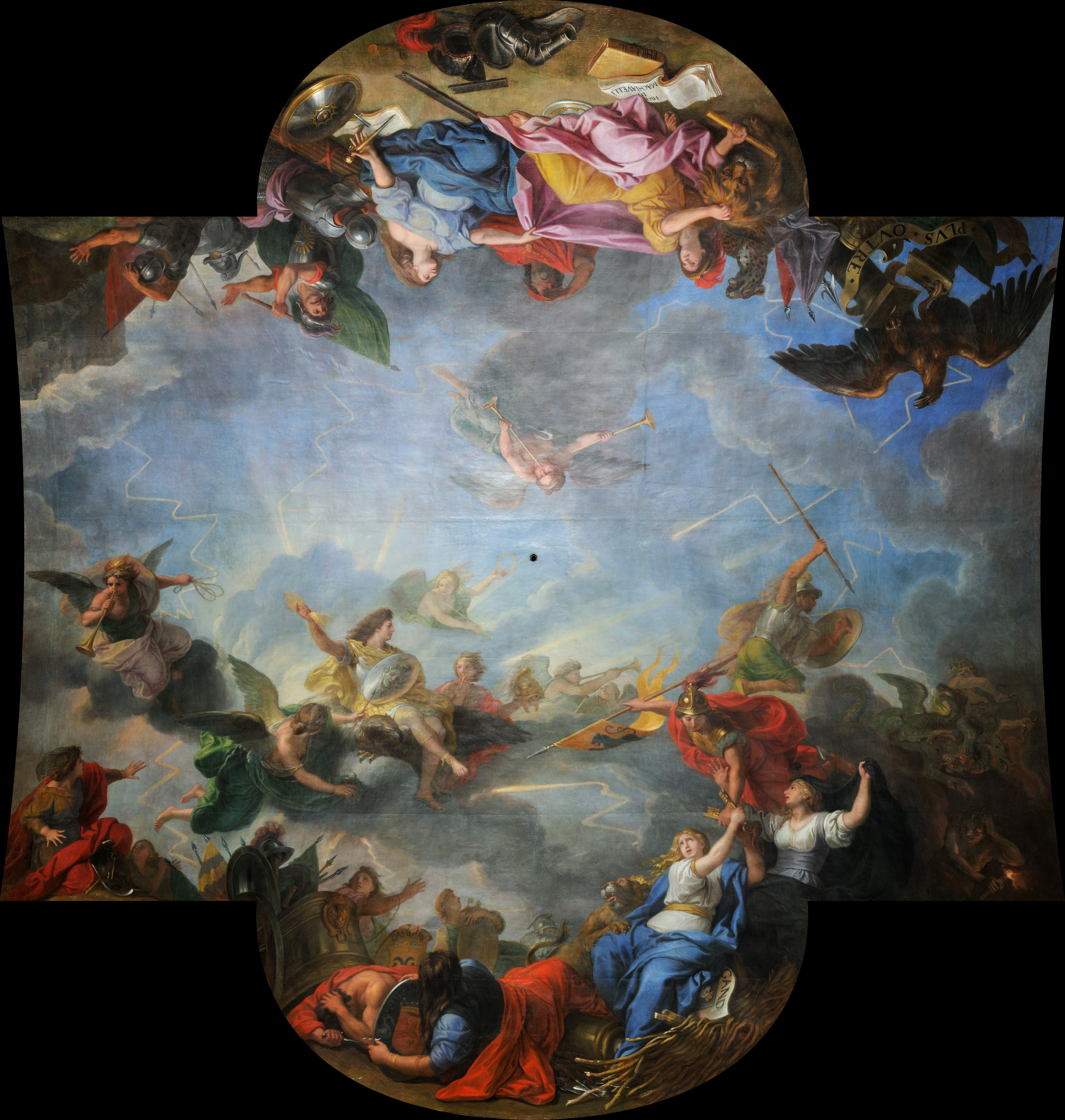
Part of the ceiling of the Hall of Mirrors in the Palace of Versailles

=== Early life and training ===
Born in Paris, Le Brun attracted the notice of Chancellor Séguier, who placed him at the age of eleven in the studio of Simon Vouet. He was also a pupil of François Perrier. At fifteen he received commissions from Cardinal Richelieu, in the execution of which he displayed an ability which obtained the generous commendations of Nicolas Poussin, in whose company Le Brun started for Rome in 1642.

In Rome, he remained four years in the receipt of a pension due to the liberality of the chancellor. There he worked under Poussin, adapting the latter's theories of art. While in Rome, Le Brun studied ancient Roman sculpture, made copies after Raphael, and absorbed the influence of the local painters.

On his return to Paris in 1646, Le Brun found numerous patrons, of whom Nicholas Fouquet was the most important, for whom he painted a large portrait of Anne of Austria. Employed at Vaux-le-Vicomte, Le Brun ingratiated himself with Cardinal Mazarin, then secretly pitting Jean-Baptiste Colbert against Fouquet.

Le Brun was the driving force behind the establishment of the French Royal Academy of Painting and Sculpture in 1648, and was elected as one of the original twelve elders in charge of its running. He remained a dominant figure at the academy and held the positions of chancellor in 1655 (from 1663 chancellor for life), rector from 1668 and director from 1683. When Colbert took control of the institution in 1661, Le Brun was there to assist him in his endeavour to reorganise it with the goal that the academicians would work towards bringing about a theoretical foundation for a national French art . Both also founded the Academy of France at Rome in 1666 as a base for promising young artists who would live and learn there for a certain period on the expense of the crown.

Another project Le Brun worked on was Hôtel Lambert. The ceiling in the gallery of Hercules was painted by him. Le Brun started work on the project in 1650, shortly after his return from Italy. The decoration continued intermittently over twelve years or so, as it was interrupted by the renovation of Vaux le Vicomte.

In 1660 they established the Gobelins manufactory, which at first was a great school for the manufacture, not of tapestries only, but of every class of furniture required in the royal palaces. Commanding the industrial arts through the Gobelins—of which he was director—and the whole artistic world through the academy—in which he successively held every post—Le Brun imprinted his own character on all that was produced in France during his lifetime. He was the originator of Louis XIV Style and gave a direction to the national tendencies which endured centuries after his death. The artistic output of artists and students from the Gobelins would also exert a strong influence on art elsewhere in Europe.

=== Success years ===
The nature of his emphatic and pompous talent was in harmony with the taste of the King, who, full of admiration for the paintings by Le Brun for his triumphal entry into Paris (1660) and his decorations at the Château Vaux le Vicomte (1661), commissioned him to execute a series of subjects from the history of Alexander. The first of these, "Alexander and the Family of Darius," so delighted Louis XIV that he at once ennobled Le Brun (December 1662), who was also created Premier Peintre du Roi (First Painter of the King) with a pension of 12,000 livres, the same amount as he had yearly received in the service of the magnificent Fouquet. The king had declared him "the greatest French artist of all time". "The Family of Darius," also known as "The Queens of Persia at the Feet of Alexander," was later cut down slightly in size by Le Brun, and retouched to disguise the alteration, presumably to make the painting similar in size to a painting by Paolo Veronese that Louis XIV had acquired.

From this date all that was done in the royal palaces was directed by Le Brun. Designs had to be approved by the king before they could be rendered into paintings or sculptures. In 1663, he became director of the Académie royale de peinture et de sculpture, where he laid the basis of academicism and became the all-powerful, peerless master of 17th-century French art. It was during this period that he dedicated a series of works to the history of Alexander the Great (The Battles of Alexander The Great), and he did not miss the opportunity to make a stronger connection between the magnificence of Alexander and that of the great King. While he was working on The Battles, Le Brun's style became much more personal as he moved away from the ancient masters that influenced him.

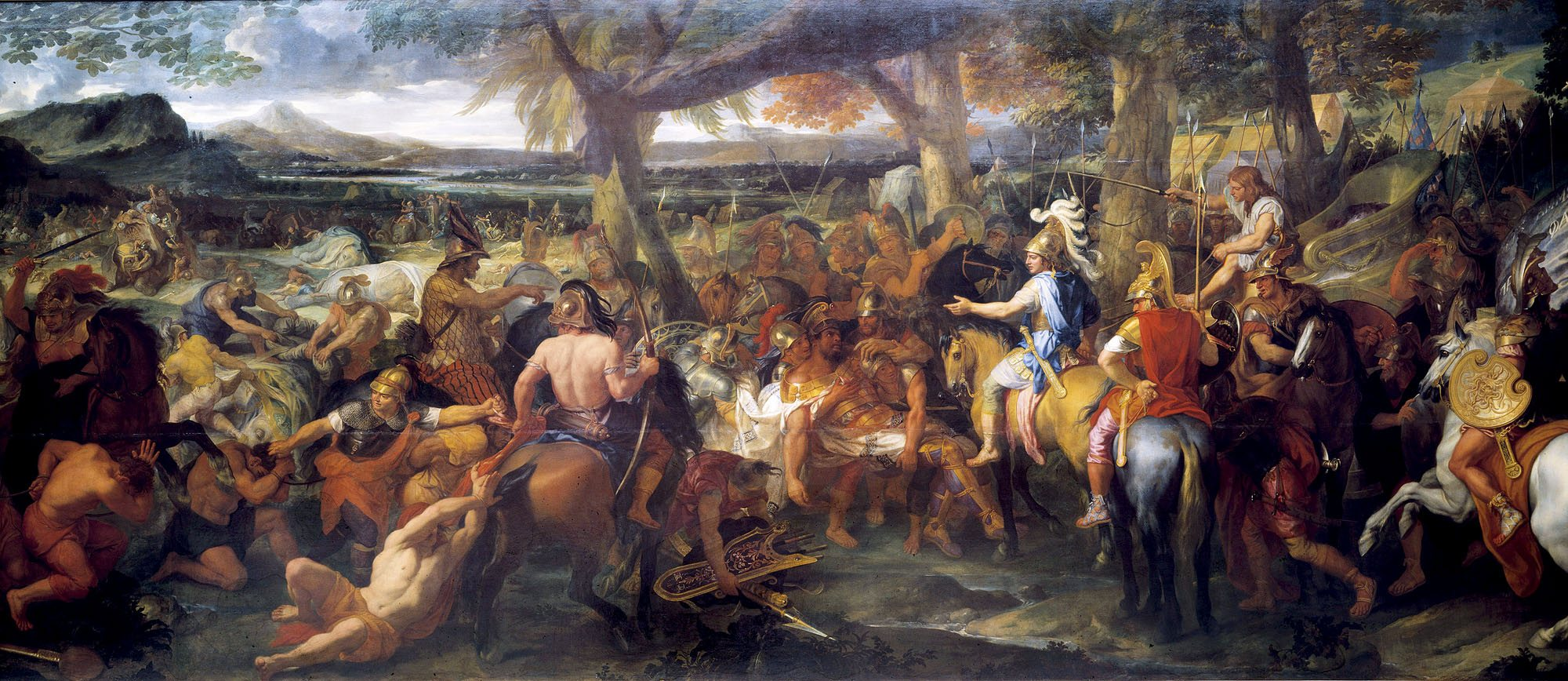
Alexander and Porus, painted 1673

Work on the Gallery of Apollo in the Louvre was interrupted in 1677 when Lebrun accompanied the king to Flanders (on his return from Lille he painted several compositions in the Château de Saint-Germain-en-Laye), and finally—for they remained unfinished at his death—by the vast labours of Versailles, where he reserved for himself the Halls of War and Peace (Salons de la Guerre and de la Paix, 1686), the Ambassadors' Staircase, and the Great Hall of Mirrors (Galerie des Glaces, 1679–1684). Le Brun's decoration is not only a work of art, it is the definitive monument of a reign.

In 1669, Louis XIV elected to completely renovate Versailles, which was then a tiny palace, and transform it into an opulent dwelling where he would meet with his subjects and foreign diplomats. Le Brun was in charge of its decoration down to the most minute details of arrangement and presentation. In addition to classical paintings, depictions of Louis' reign also adorned the palace walls. The whole structure and its decorations were intended to awe visitors with the splendor, wealth and taste of the king. The Escalier des Ambassadeurs was the main staircase at the entryway to Versailles from its completion in 1679 until its destruction in 1752. The king was so pleased with its appearance that he reportedly referred to it as "Monsieur Le Brun's staircase" when he showed it to an ambassador from Spain in 1679.

=== Later years ===
At the death of Colbert, François-Michel le Tellier, Marquis de Louvois, who succeeded as superintendent in the department of public works, showed no favour to Le Brun who was Colbert's favorite, and in spite of the king's continued support Le Brun felt a bitter change in his position. This contributed to the illness that on 22 February 1690 ended in his death in Gobelins (his private mansion, in Paris).

== Le Brun's work and legacy ==
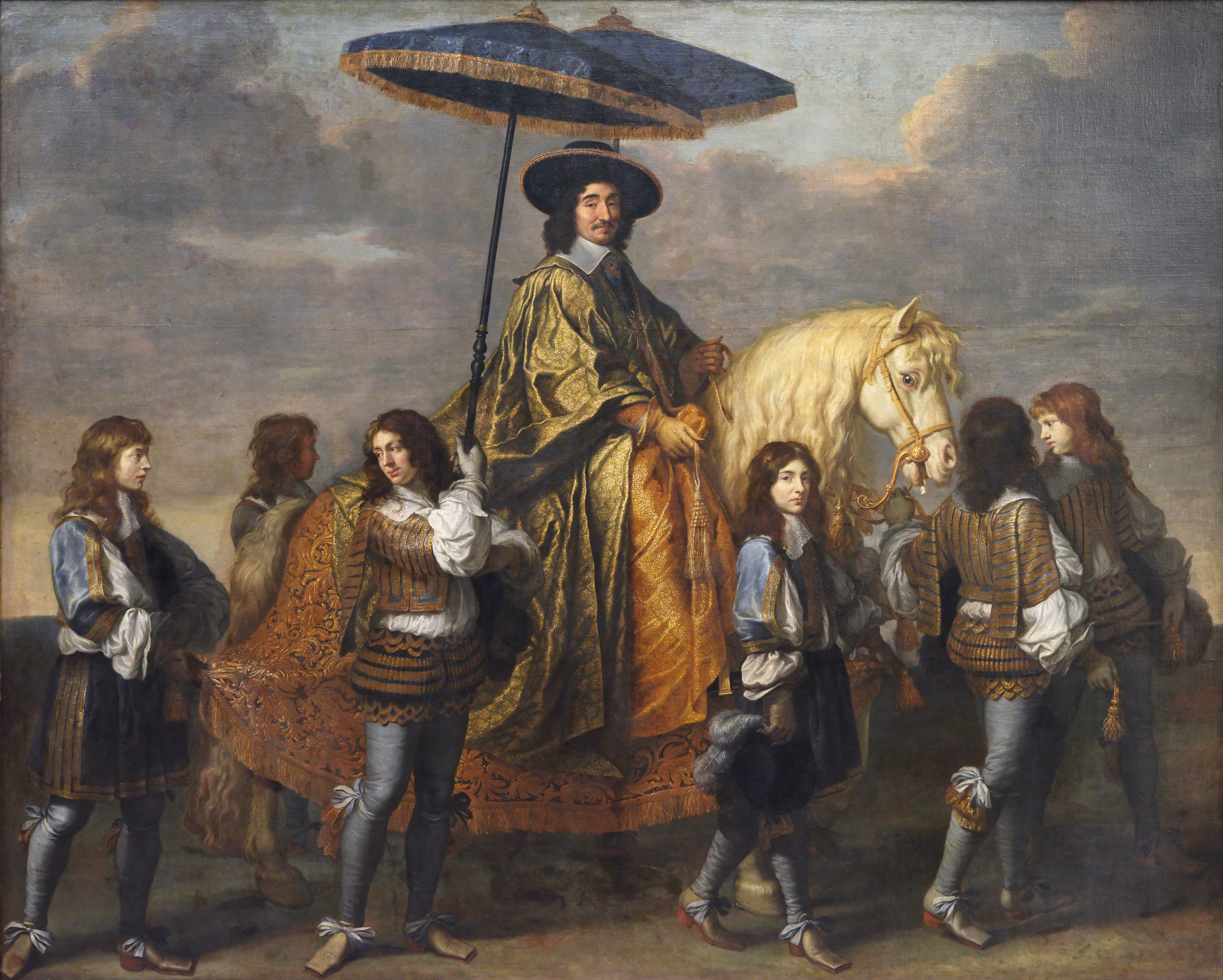
Chancellor Séguier and his suite, ca. 1660, Musée du Louvre

Le Brun primarily worked for King Louis XIV, for whom he executed large altarpieces and battle pieces. His most important paintings are at Versailles. Besides his gigantic labours at Versailles and the Louvre, the number of his works for religious corporations and private patrons is enormous. Le Brun was also a fine portraitist and an excellent draughtsman, but he was not fond of portrait or landscape painting, which he felt to be a mere exercise in developing technical prowess. What mattered was scholarly composition, whose ultimate goal was to nourish the spirit. The fundamental basis on which the director of the academy-based his art was unquestionably to make his paintings speak, through a series of symbols, costumes and gestures that allowed him to select for his composition the narrative elements that gave his works a particular depth. For Le Brun, a painting represented a story one could read. Nearly all his compositions have been reproduced by celebrated engravers.

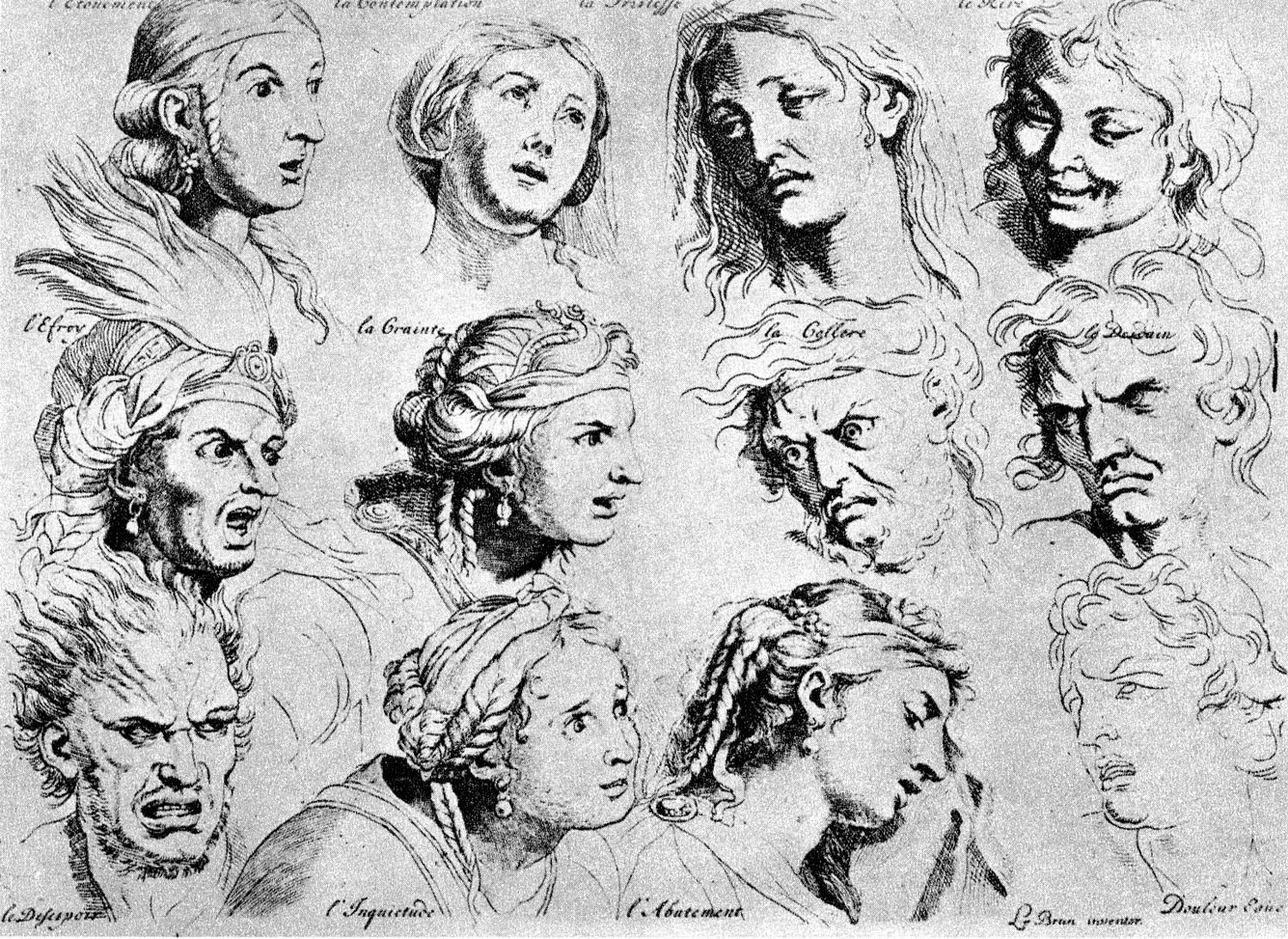
Charles le Brun, The Expressions

In his posthumously published treatise, Méthode pour apprendre à dessiner les passions (1698), he promoted the expression of the emotions in painting. Le Brun's view on emotions, which were known as "passions" at the time, drew heavy influence from the work of René Descartes. The facial expressions, which Le Brun outlined as a template for subsequent artists to follow, were believed to reveal the condition of the soul. It had much influence on art theory for the next two centuries.

Many of his drawings are in the Louvre and the Monaco Royal Collection. He was also the teacher of painter Ludovico Dorigny.

The Baroque ceiling in the Chambre des Muses at the Chateau Vaux-le-Vicomte outside Paris, was "decorated by Charles Le Brun's workshop". Many of Charles Le Brun's sketches and designs were later rendered into painting or sculpture by artists working under him. A restoration was completed in 2017 by the current owners, the de Vogüé family. The restored ceiling was unveiled to the public in March of that year.

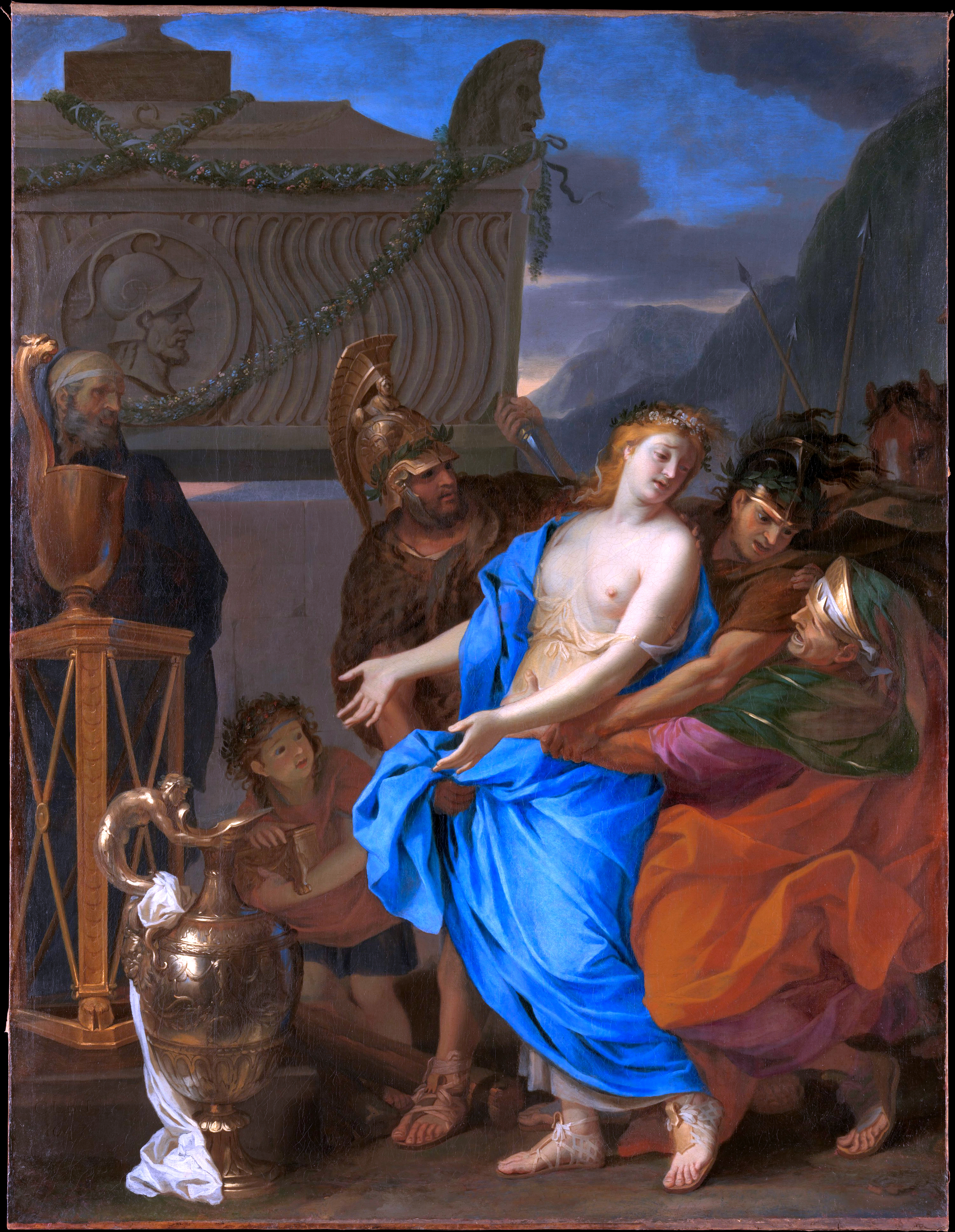
The Sacrifice of Polyxena, 1647, Metropolitan Museum of Art

On 23 January 2013, artistic advisors for the Hôtel Ritz Paris, Wanda Tymowska and Joseph Friedman, announced the discovery of The Sacrifice of Polyxena, an early work of Le Brun. The picture, dated 1647, ornamented the Coco Chanel suite of the famous Parisian palace, and went unnoticed for over a century.

Posthumously, Le Brun's reputation suffered in the years surrounding the French Revolution and its aftermath, due to his close connection with Louis XIV. By the end of the nineteenth century, the academic values he personified were out of fashion, and it was only in 1963, when a major Le Brun exhibition was organized at Versailles, that his work was reevaluated. He is now considered one of the finest and most versatile French artists of his time.

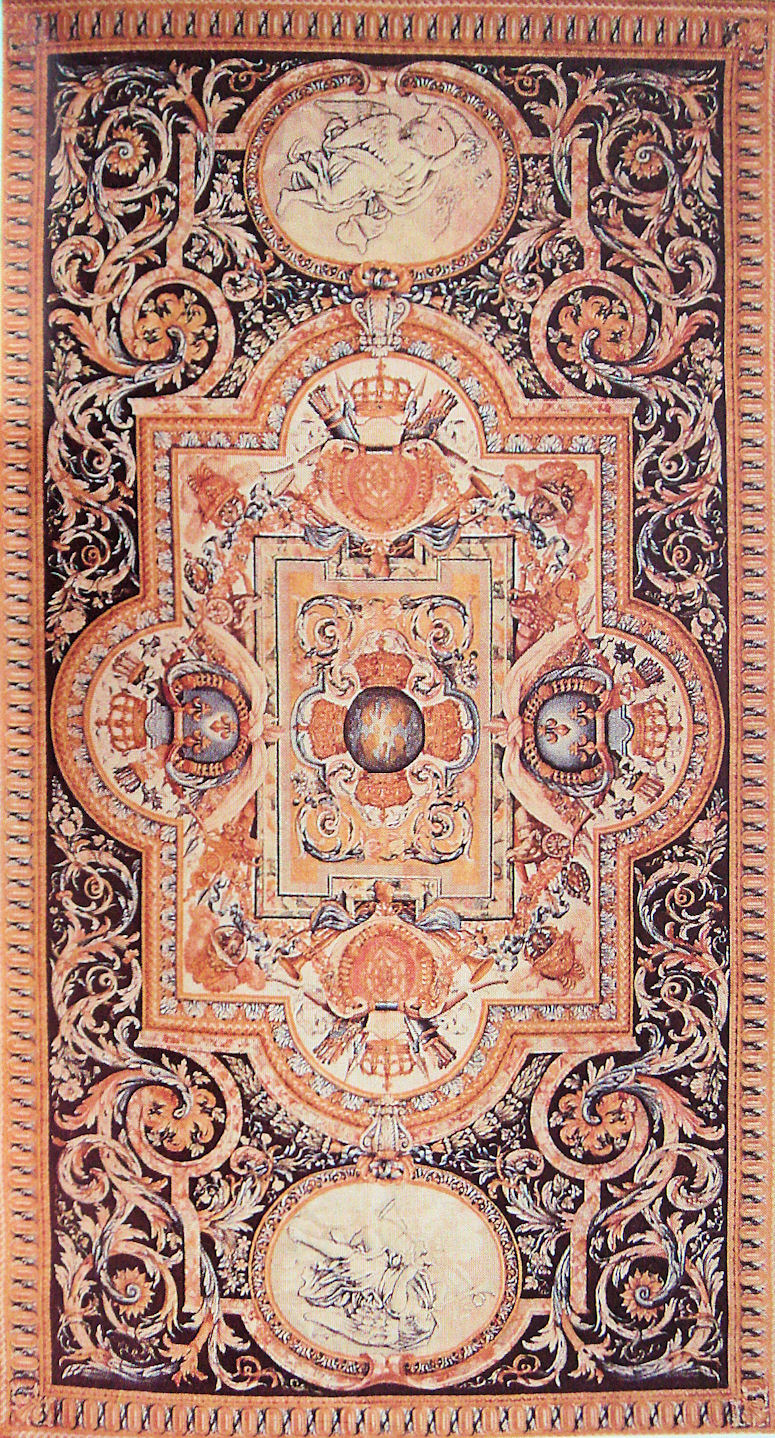
Tapis de Savonnerie, under Louis XIV, after Charles Le Brun, made for the Grande Galerie in the Louvre

== Partial anthology of works ==
Décorations:

- Decoration of the ceiling of the Galerie d'Apollon, at the Louvre Palace.
- Decoration of the Château de Vaux-le-Vicomte : King's room, Le Temps enlevant au Ciel la Vérité.
- Cupola of the Pavillon de l'Aurore at the Château de Sceaux.
- Murals of the ceiling of the Galerie des Glaces, Palace of Versailles.
- Apotheosis of Romulus, cycle eight paintings for the ceiling of a room in the Hôtel d'Aumont, Paris.

Canvases:

- The Sleep of Jesus, Musée du Louvre.
- Chancellor Séguier and his suite Musée du Louvre.
- Paintings of the Story of Alexander, Musée du Louvre.
- Louis XIV presenting his sceptre and his helmet to Jesus-Christ, Museum of Fine Arts of Lyon.
- Cycle of four paintings : Air, Earth, Fire and Water, Musée des Beaux-Arts et d'Archéologie de Châlons-en-Champagne.

Publications:

- Méthode pour apprendre à dessiner les passions (1698), posthumous publication.

== Gallery ==
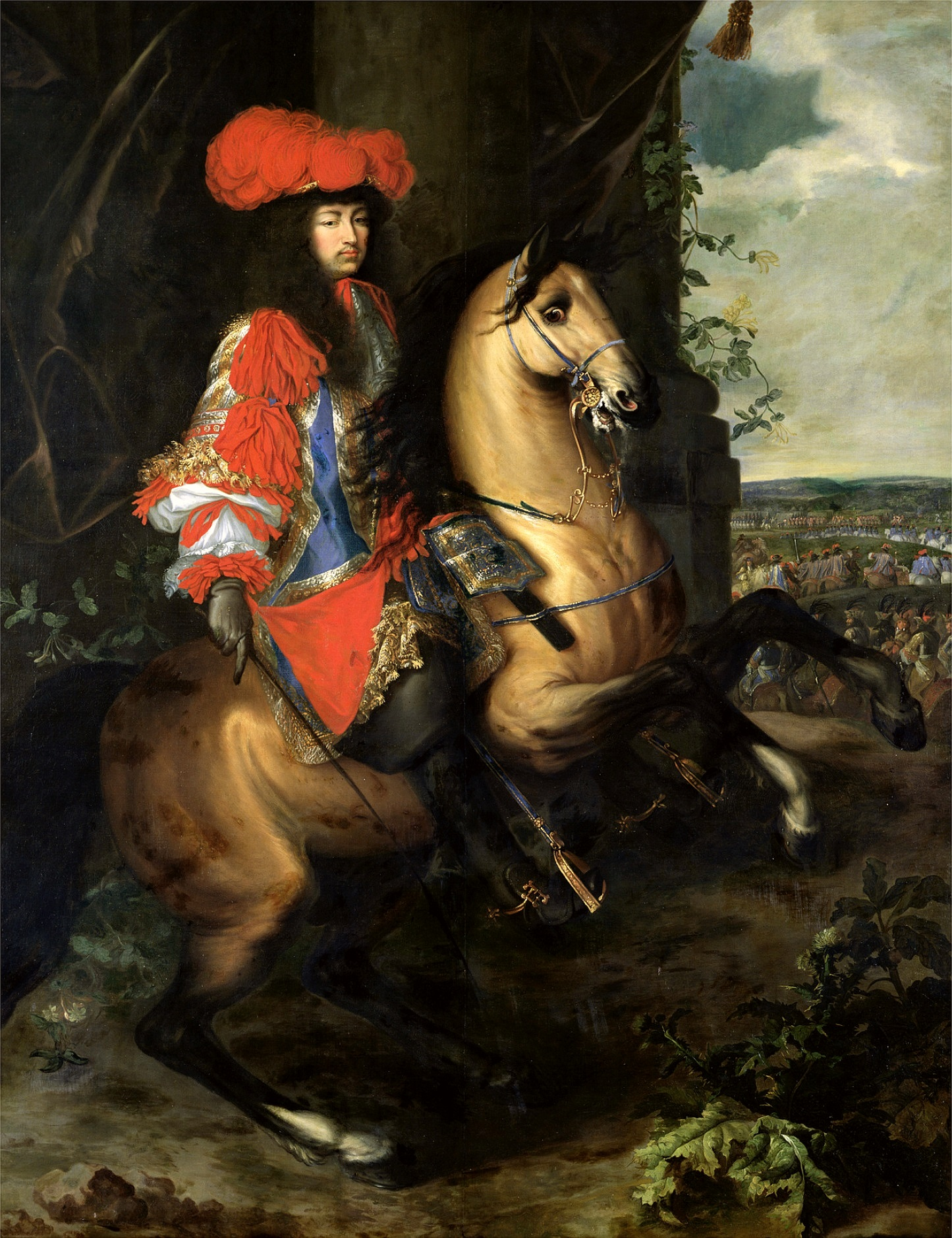
Louis XIV Equestrian Portrait, oil on canvas, Musée des Beaux-Arts, Tournai.

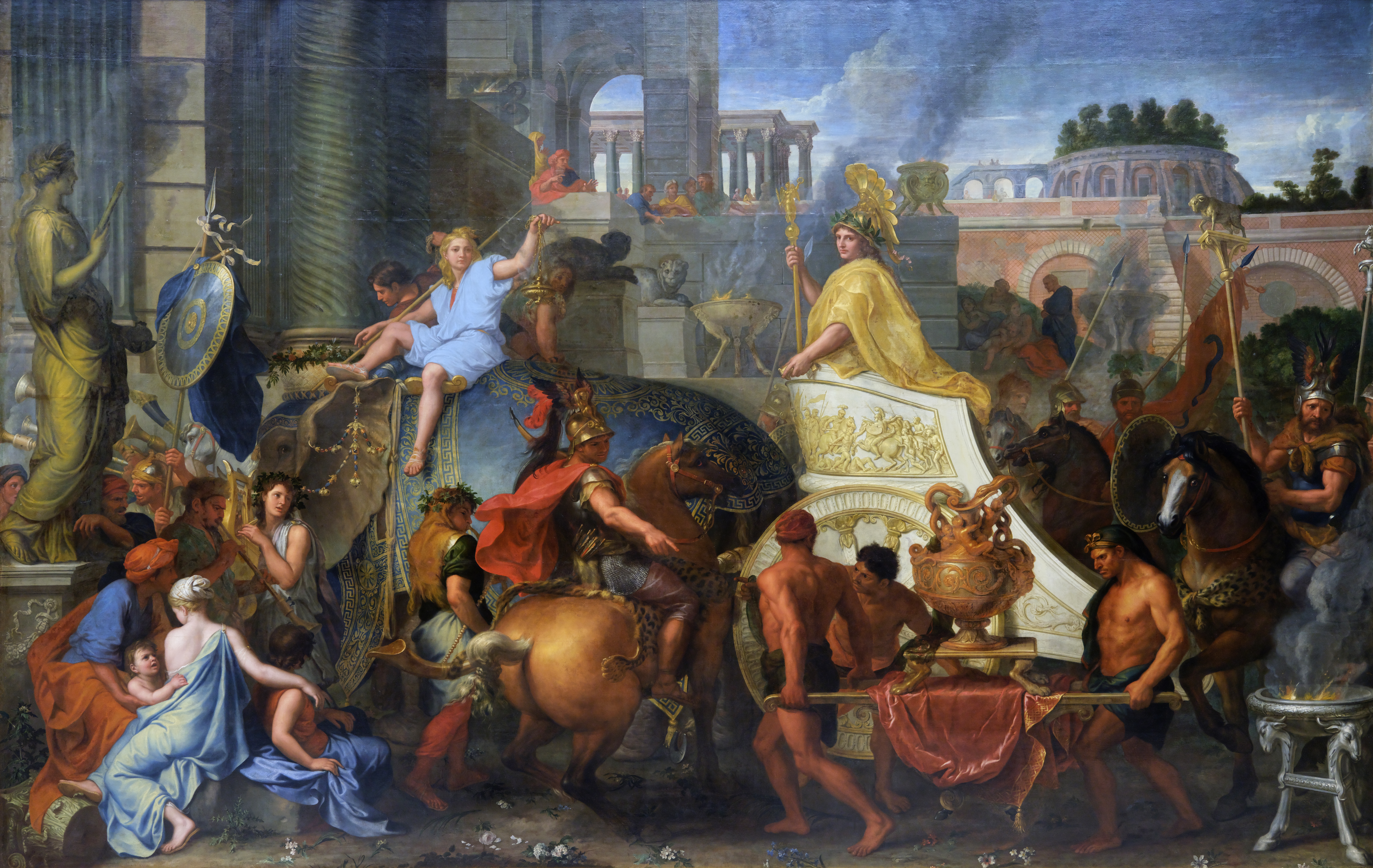
Entry of Alexander into Babylon, ca. 1664, oil on canvas, Louvre.

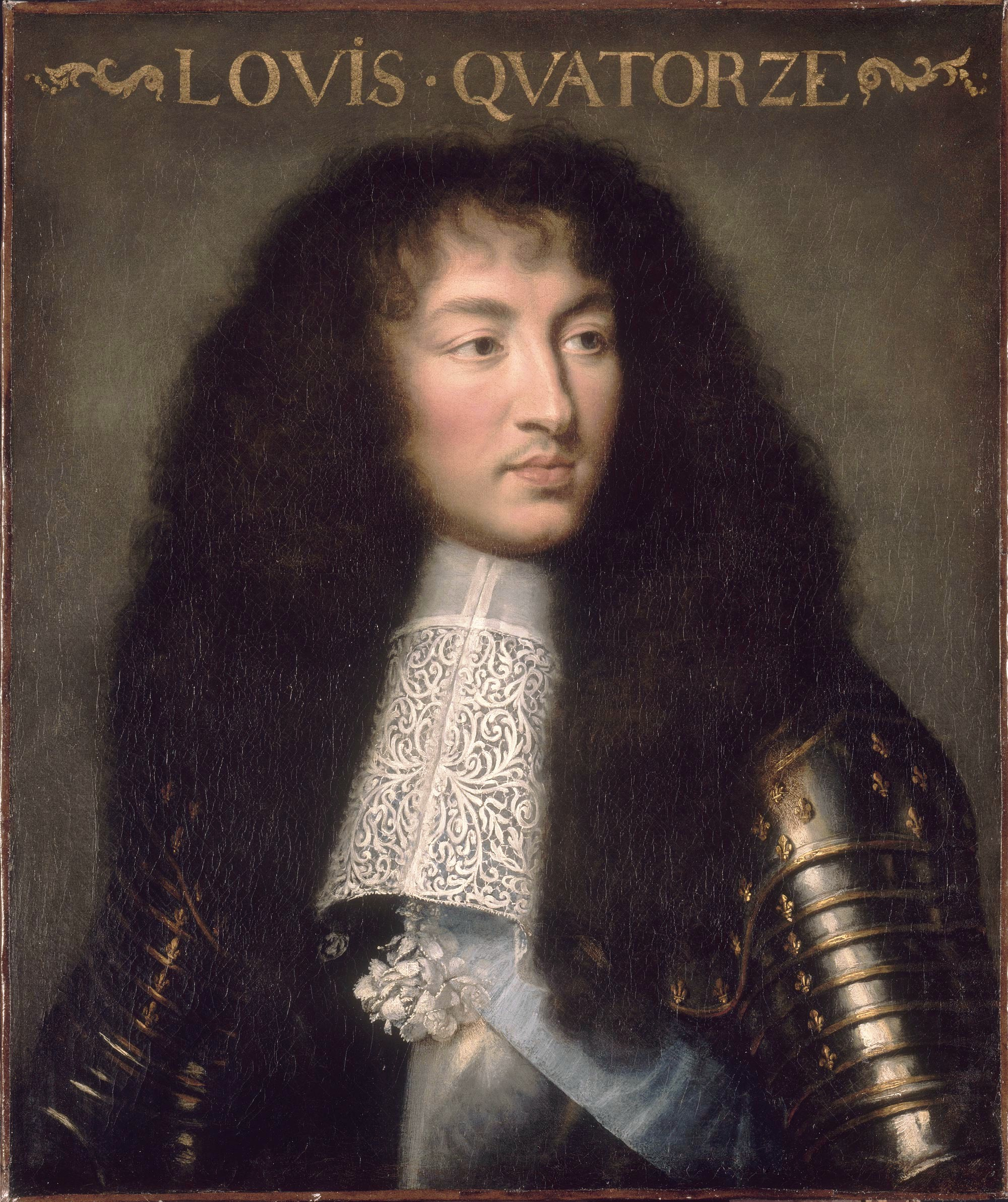
Portrait of Louis XIV, 1661.

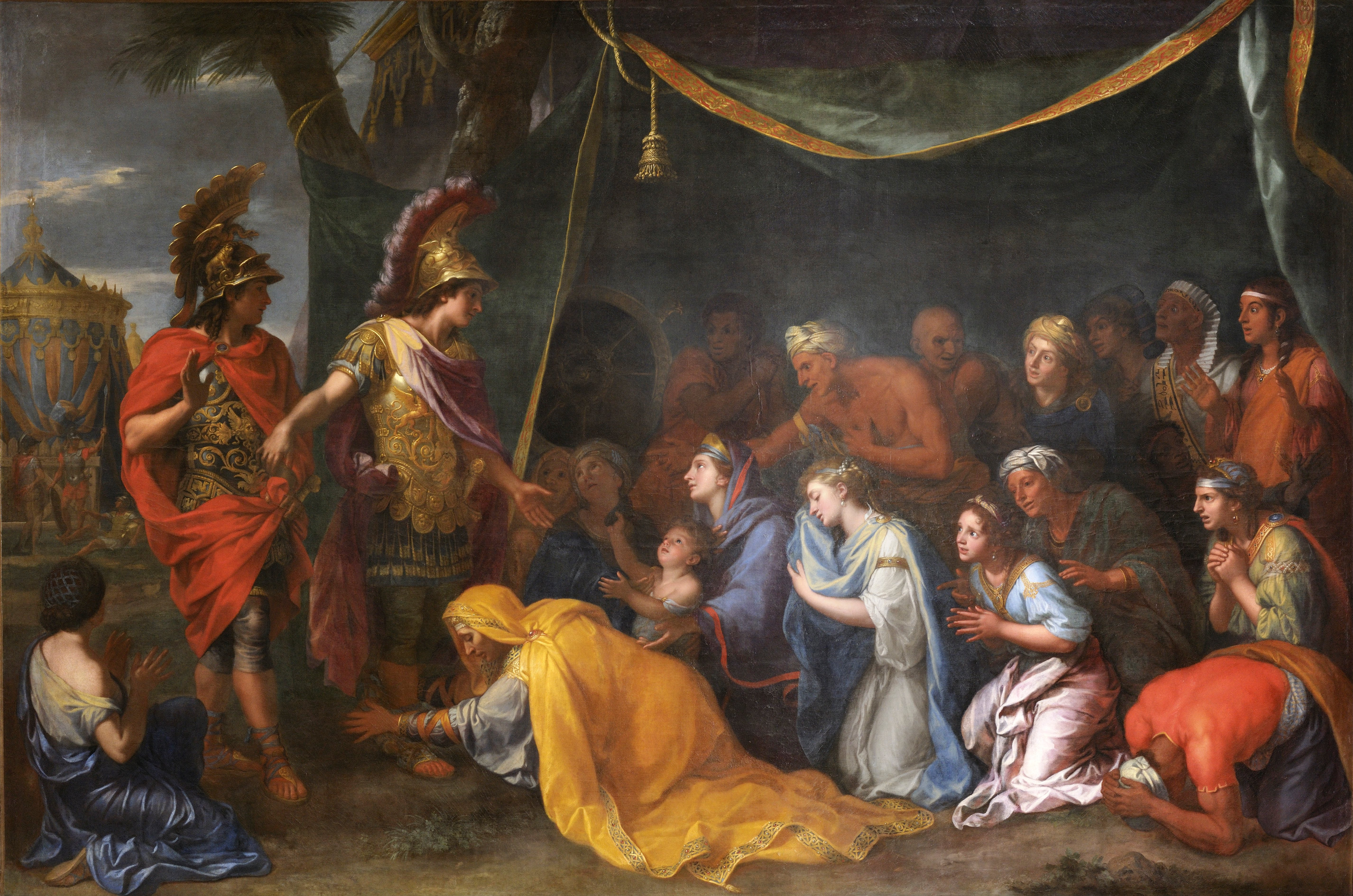
The Queens of Persia at the feet of Alexander, also called The Tent of Darius.

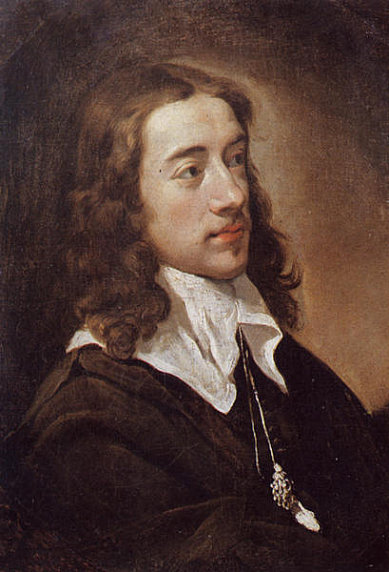
Portrait of the painter Louis Testelin, ca. 1650, oil on canvas, Louvre.

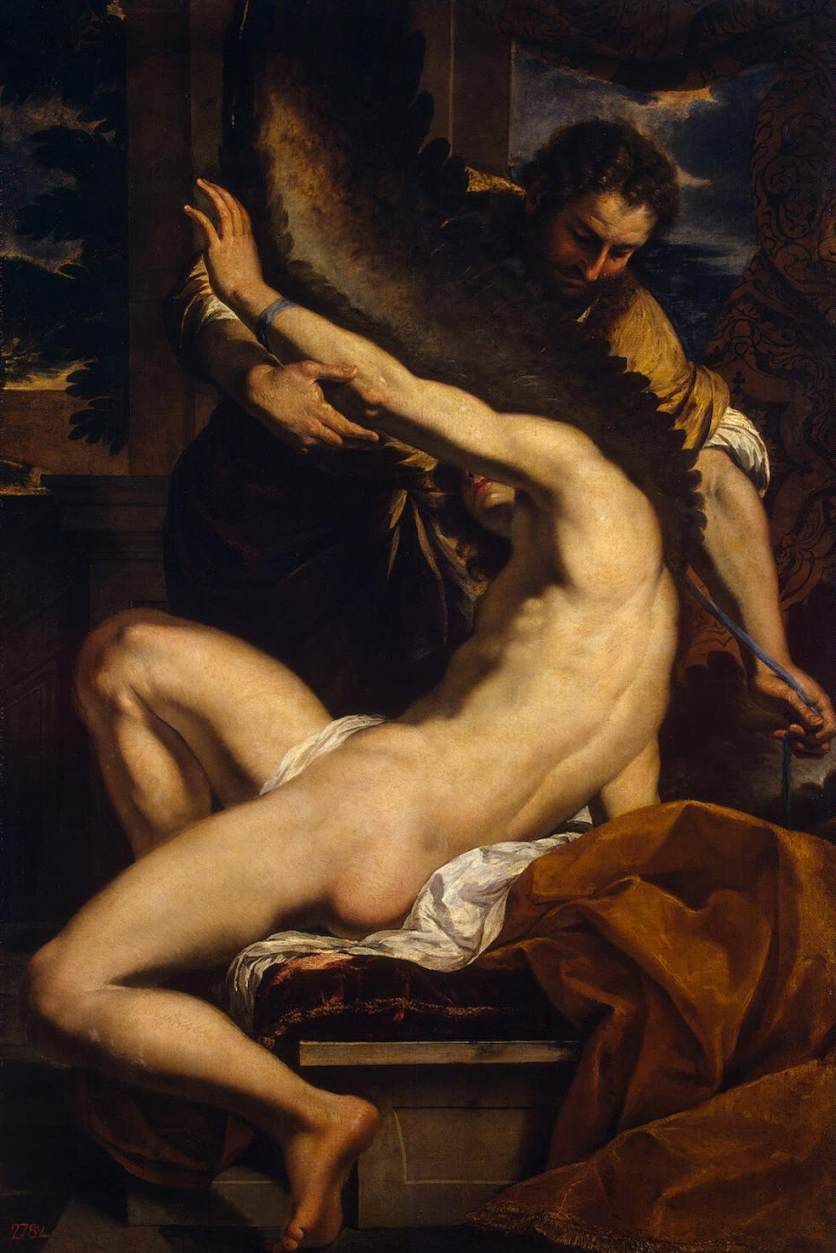
Daedalus and Icarus, c. 1645

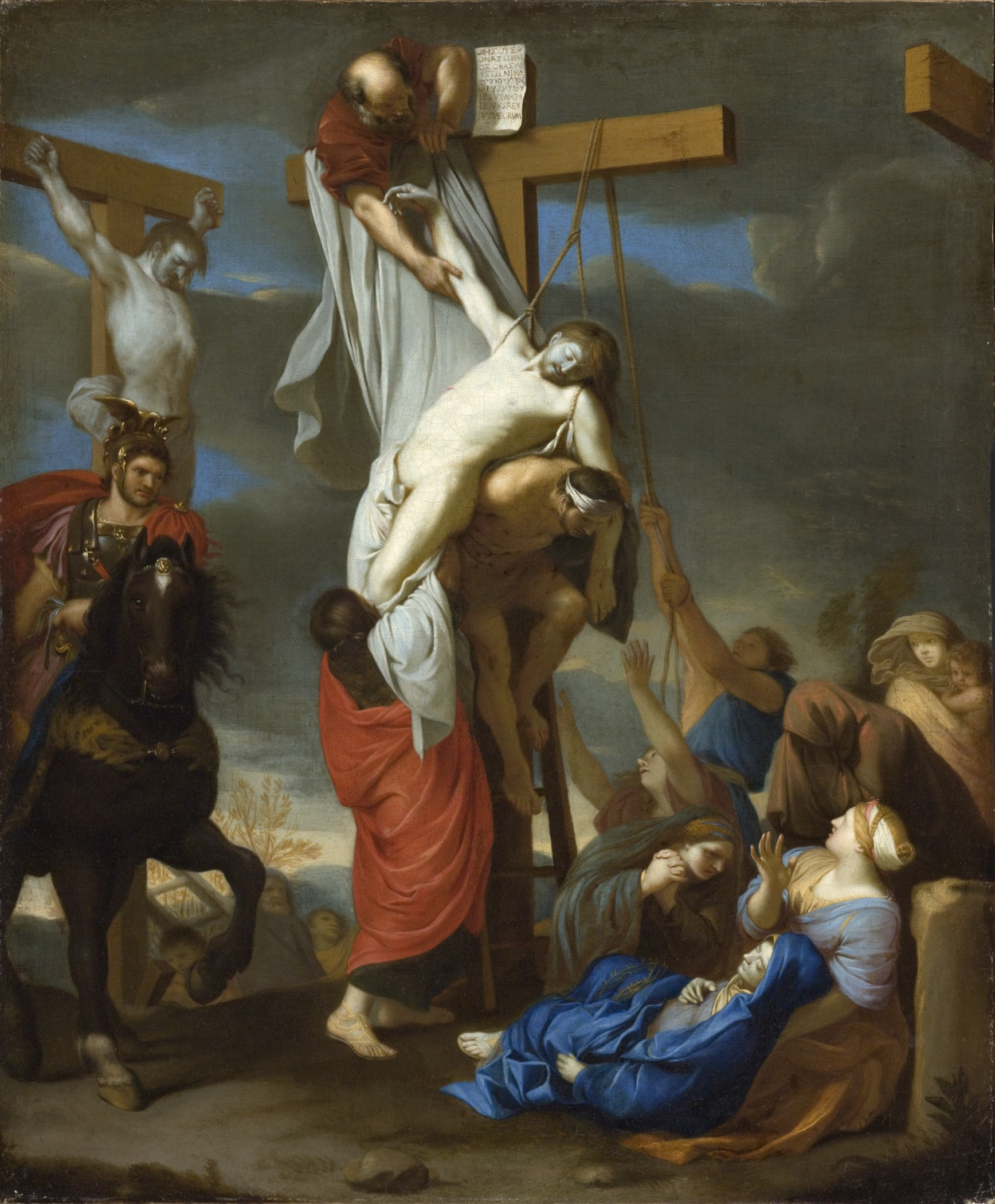
The Descent from the Cross, late 1640s

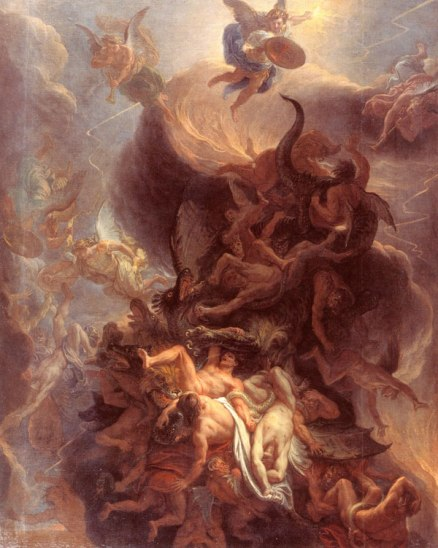
The fall of the rebel angels, after 1680, oil on canvas, Musée des Beaux-Arts de Dijon.

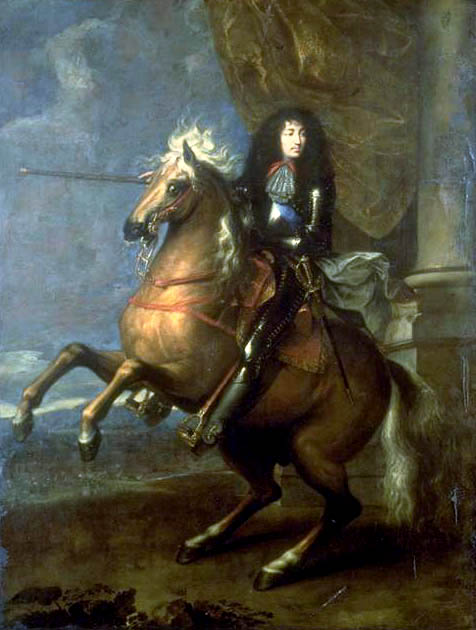
Louis XIV Equestrian Portrait, 1668, oil on canvas, Musée de la Chartreuse de Douai.

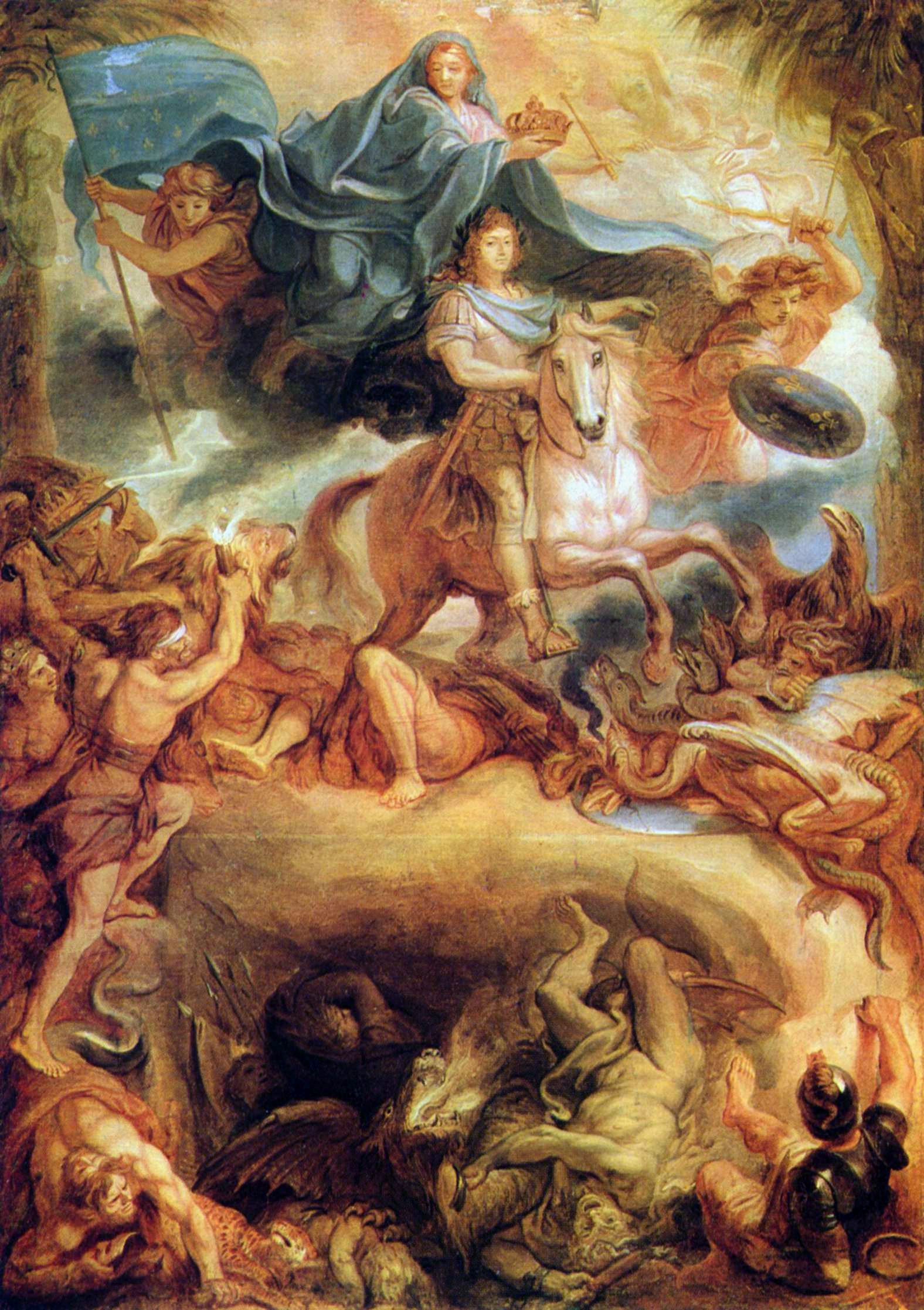
Apotheosis of Louis XIV, 1677, oil on canvas, Museum of Fine Arts (Budapest).

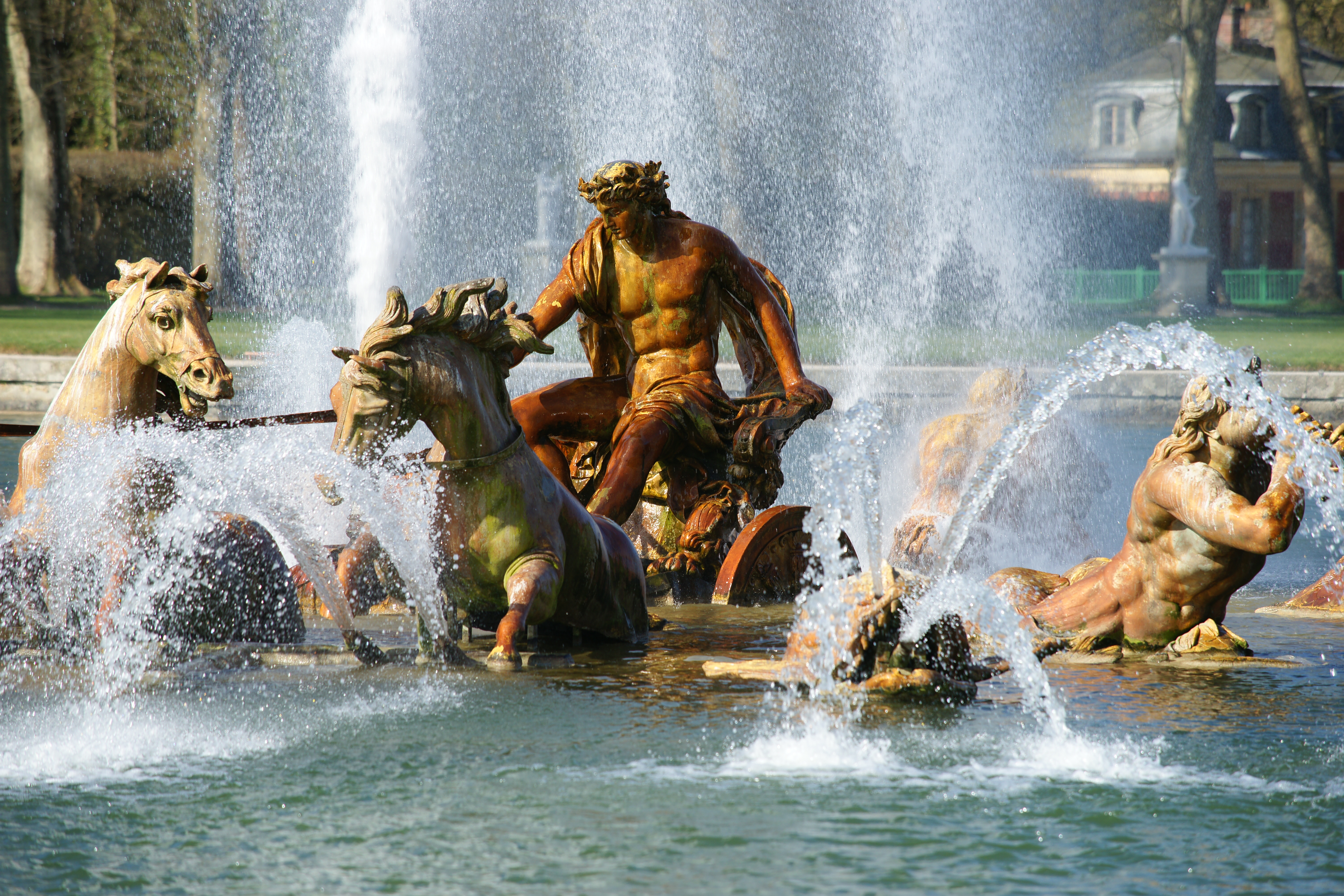
Bassin d'Apollon at the Palace of Versailles, 1668–1671. Le Brun designed the centerpiece depicting Apollo rising from the sea in a four-horse chariot.

=== Images from Méthode pour apprendre à dessiner les passions: ===
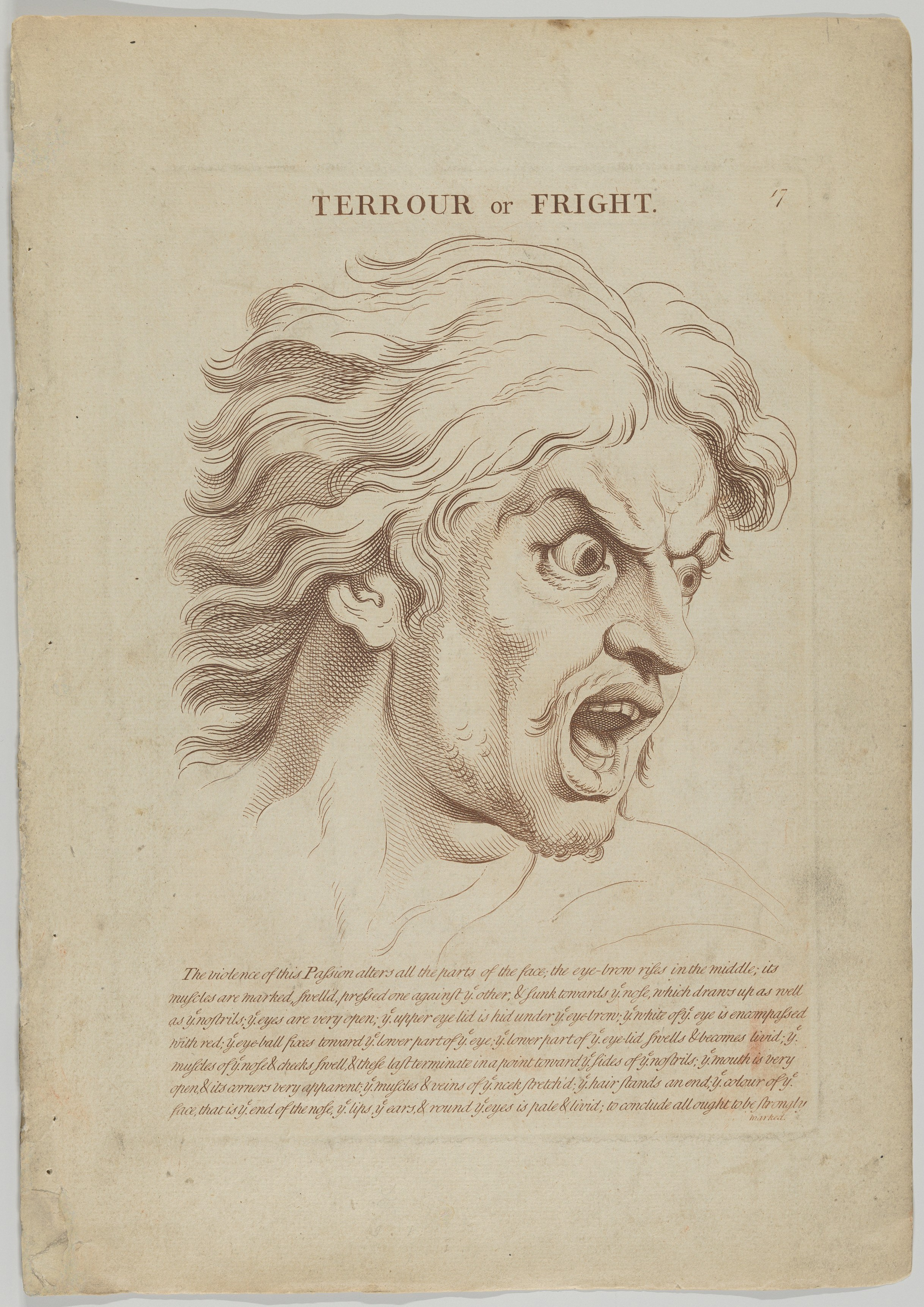
Terrour or Fright from Méthode pour apprendre à dessiner les passions

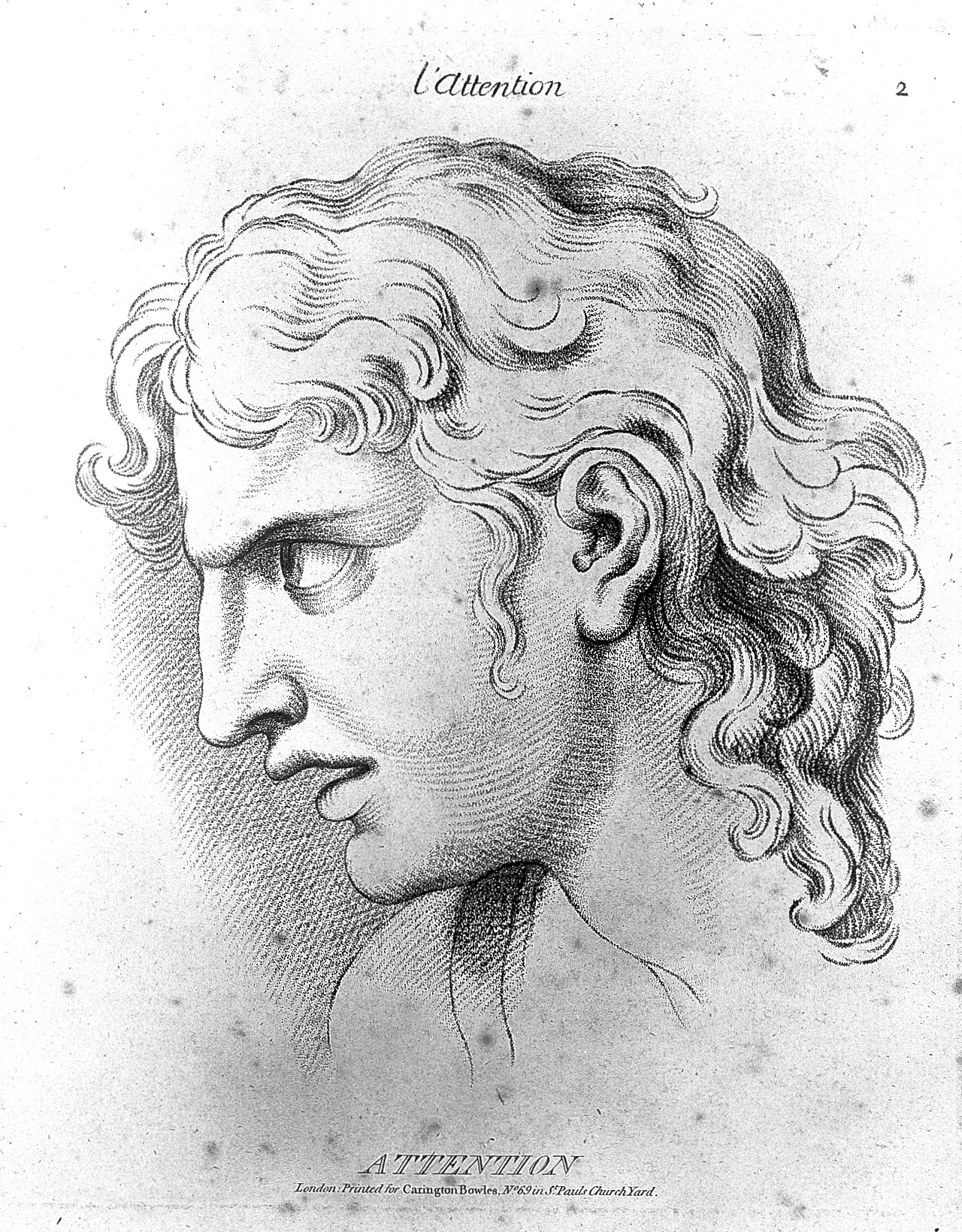
Attention from Méthode pour apprendre à dessiner les passions

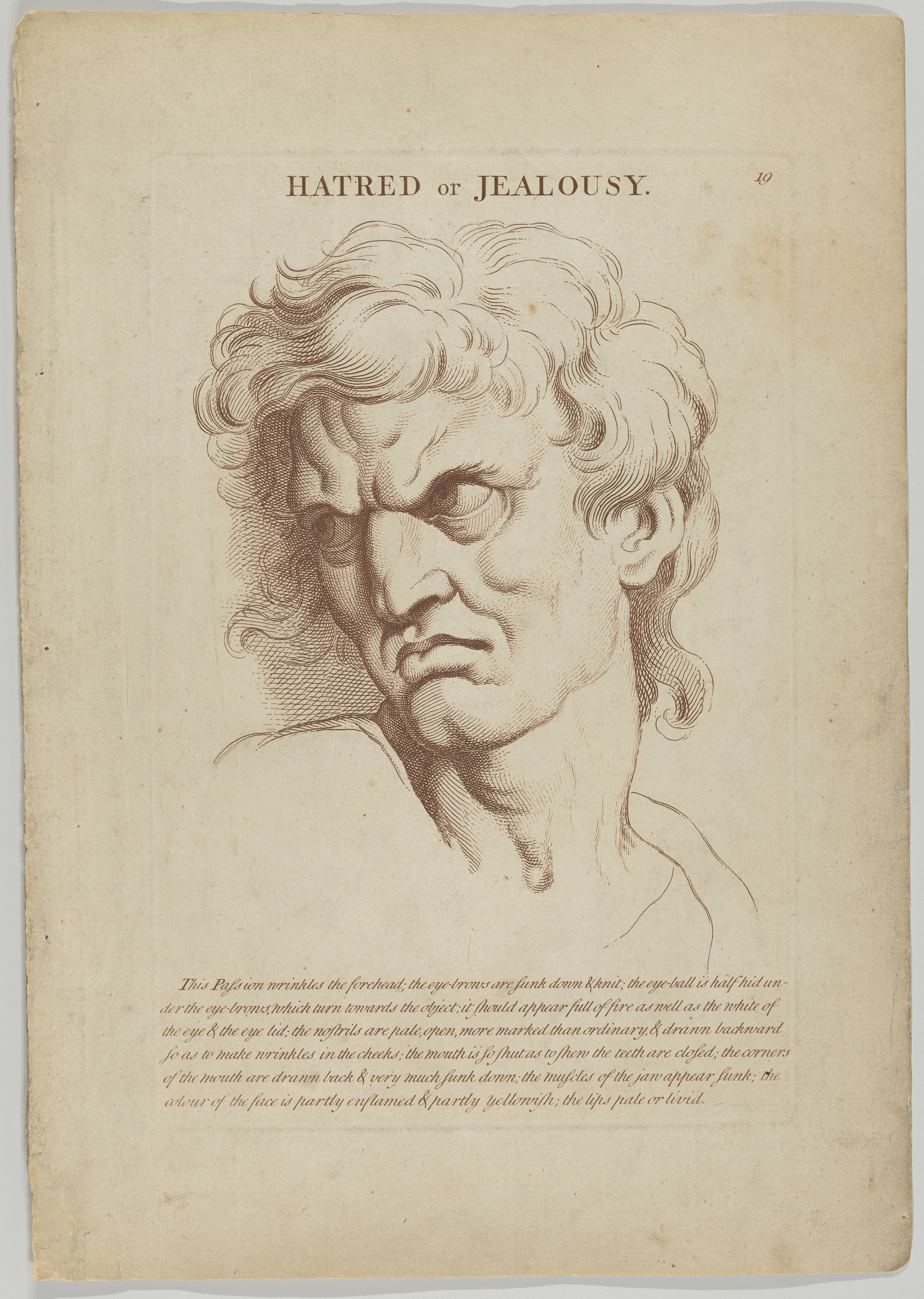
Hatred or Jealousy from Méthode pour apprendre à dessiner les passions

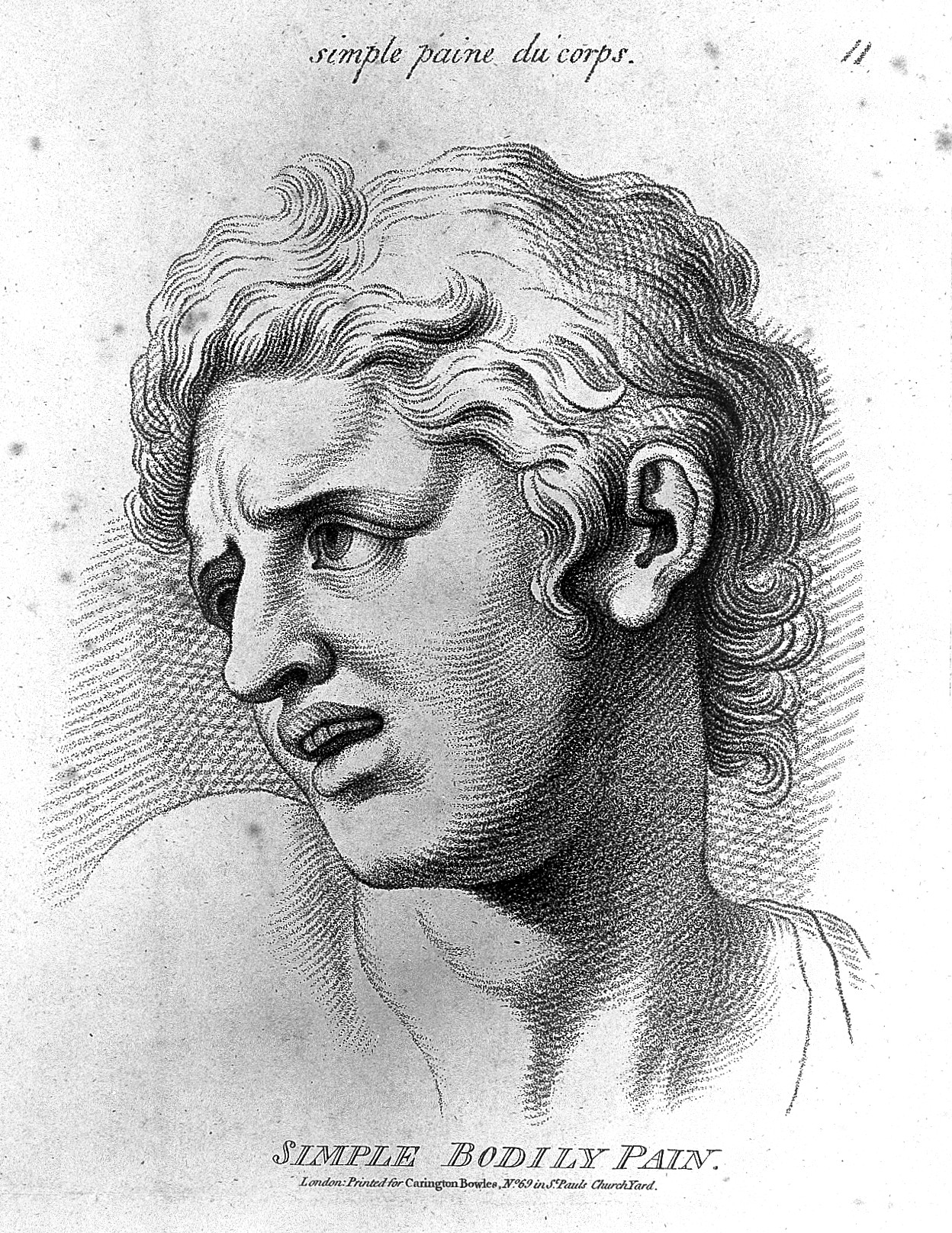
Simple Bodily Pain from Méthode pour apprendre à dessiner les passions

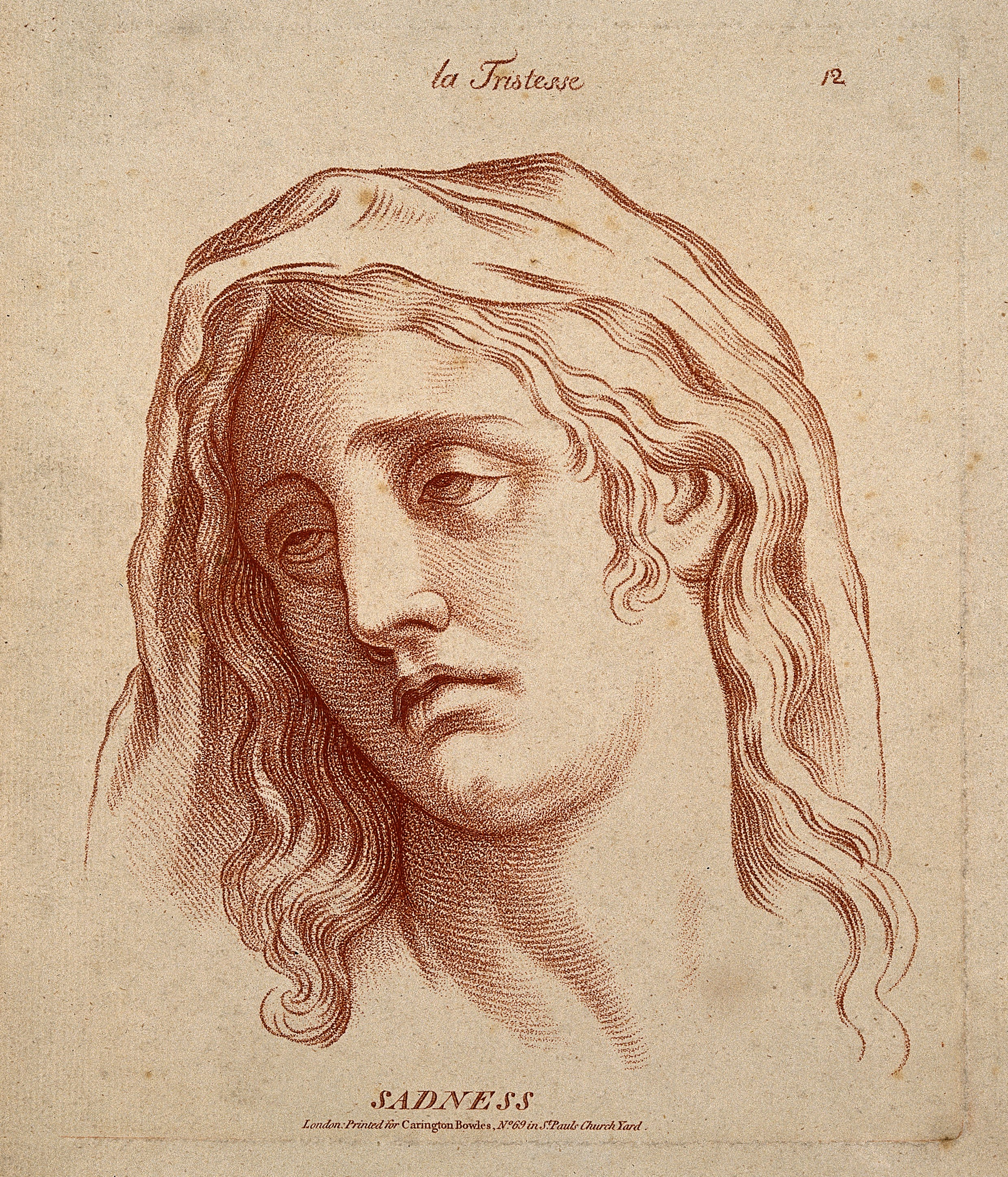
Sadness from Méthode pour apprendre à dessiner les passions

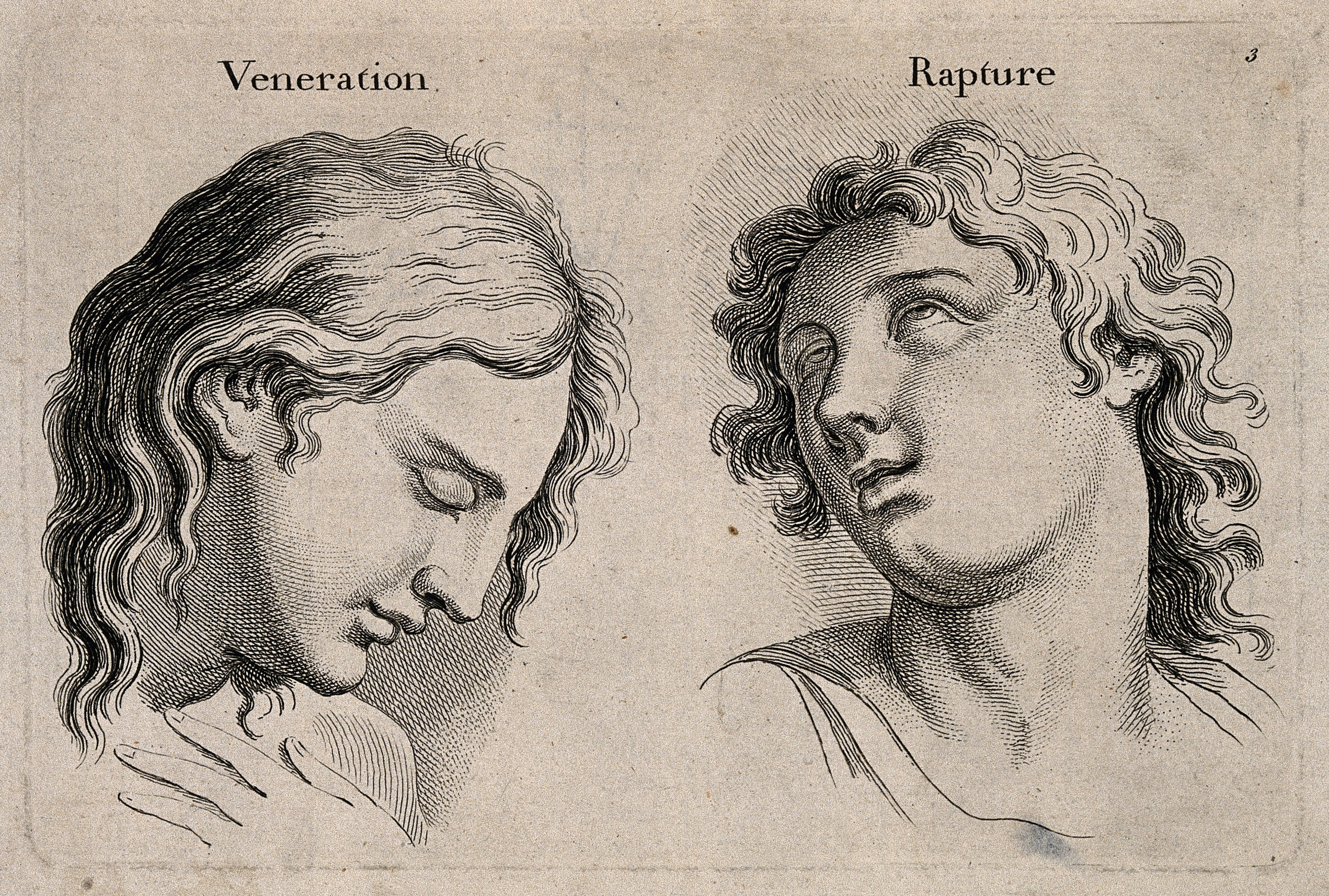
Veneration and Rapture (1760) from Méthode pour apprendre à dessiner les passions

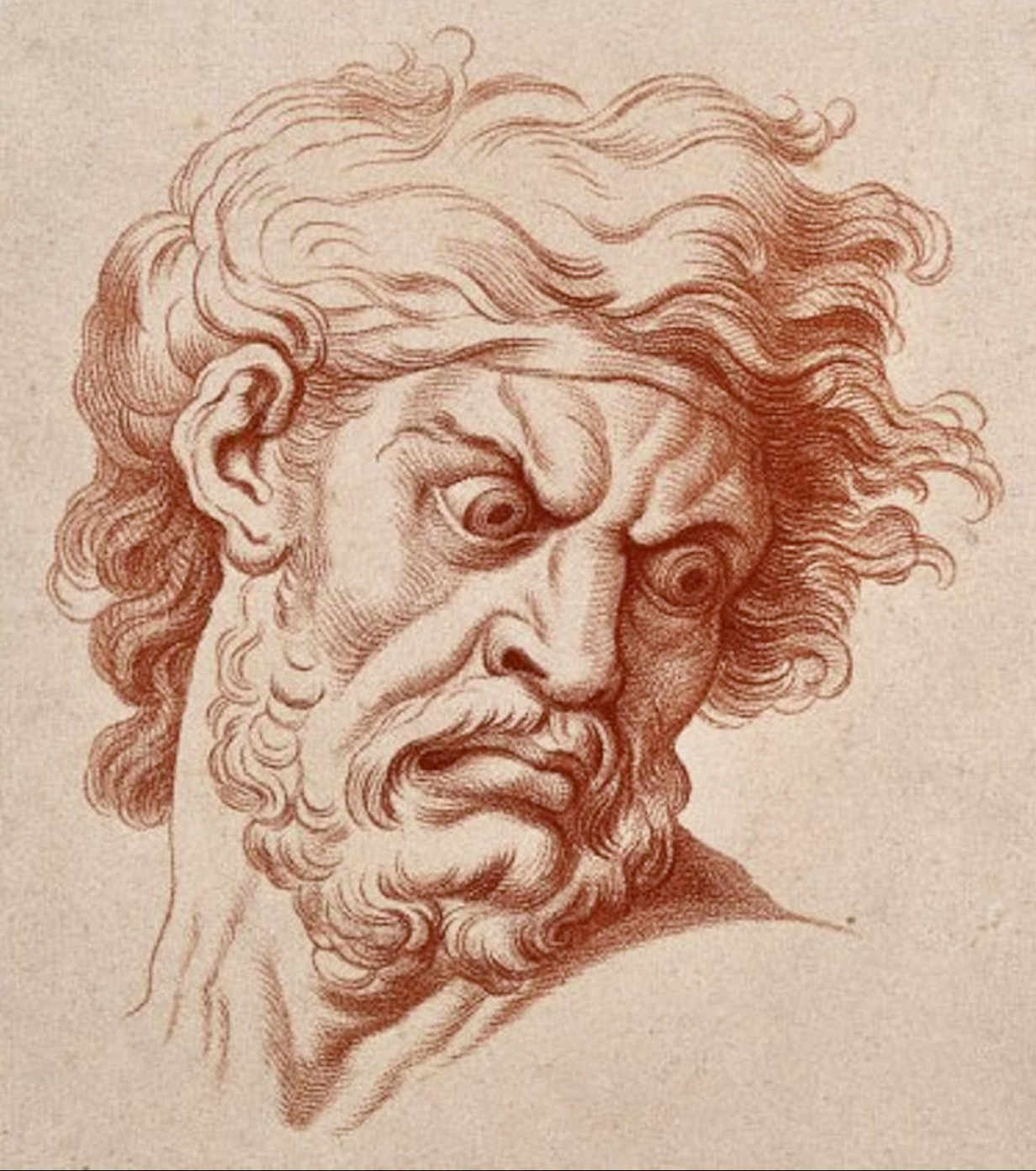
La Colère from Méthode pour apprendre à dessiner les passions

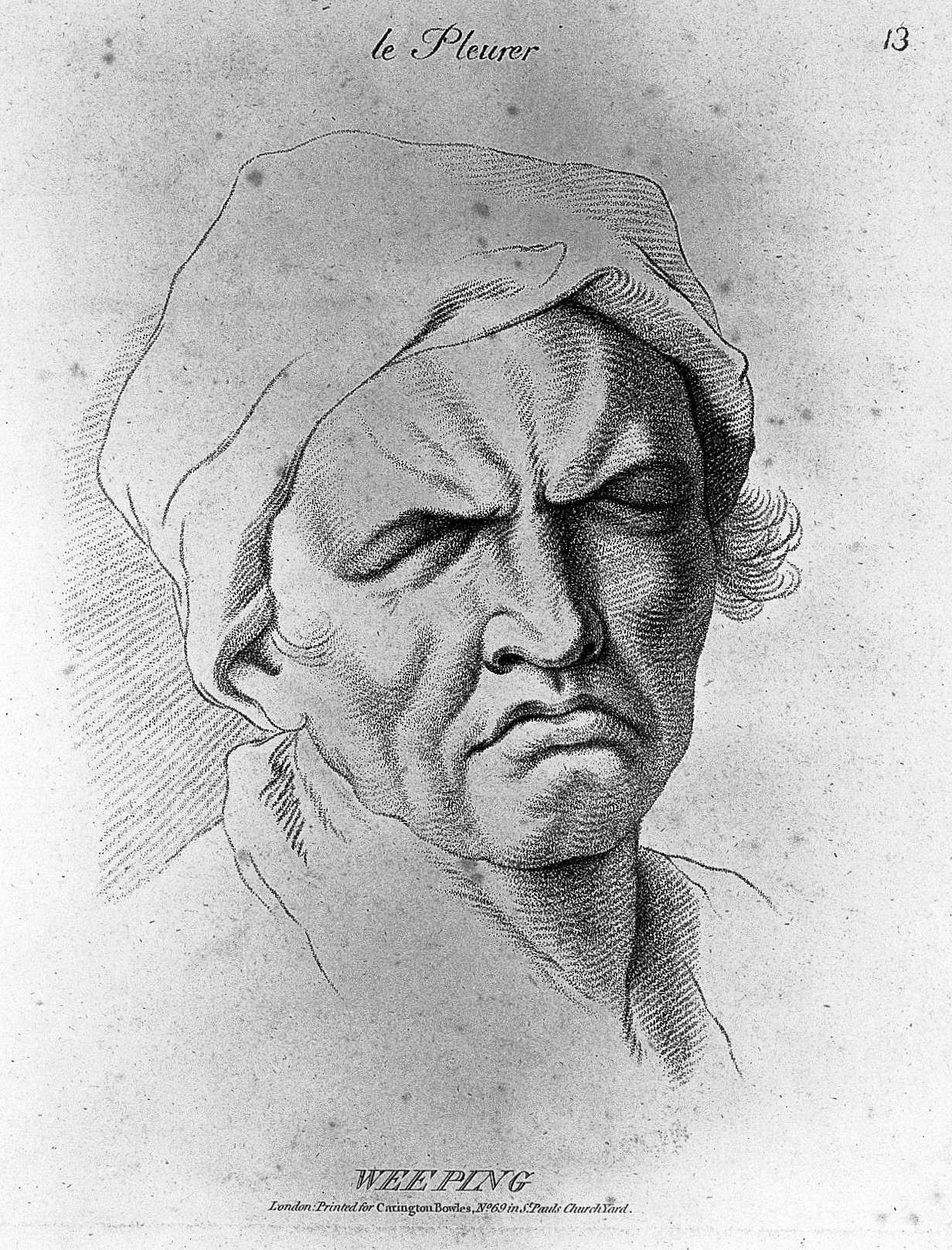
Weeping from Méthode pour apprendre à dessiner les passions

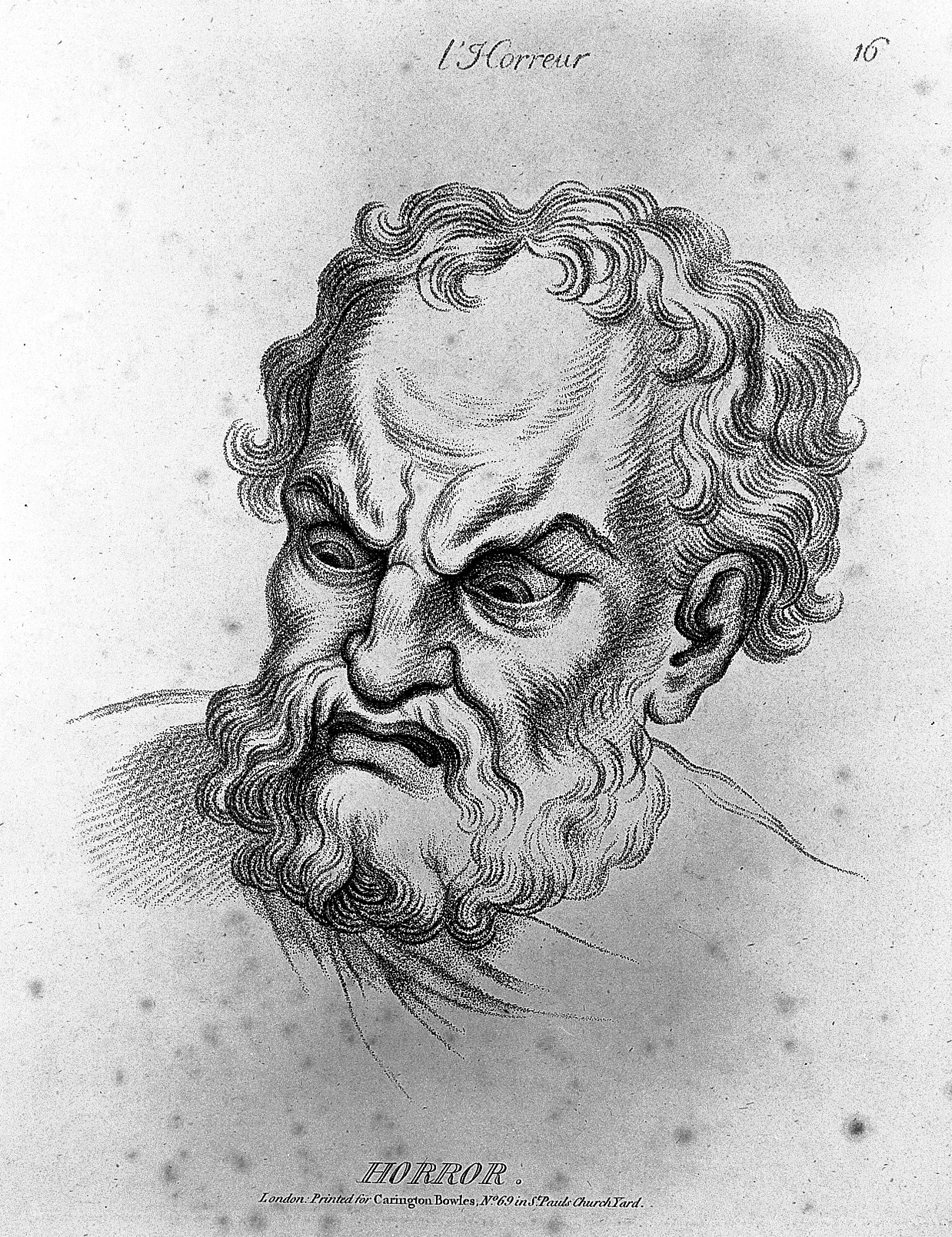
Horror from Méthode pour apprendre à dessiner les passions

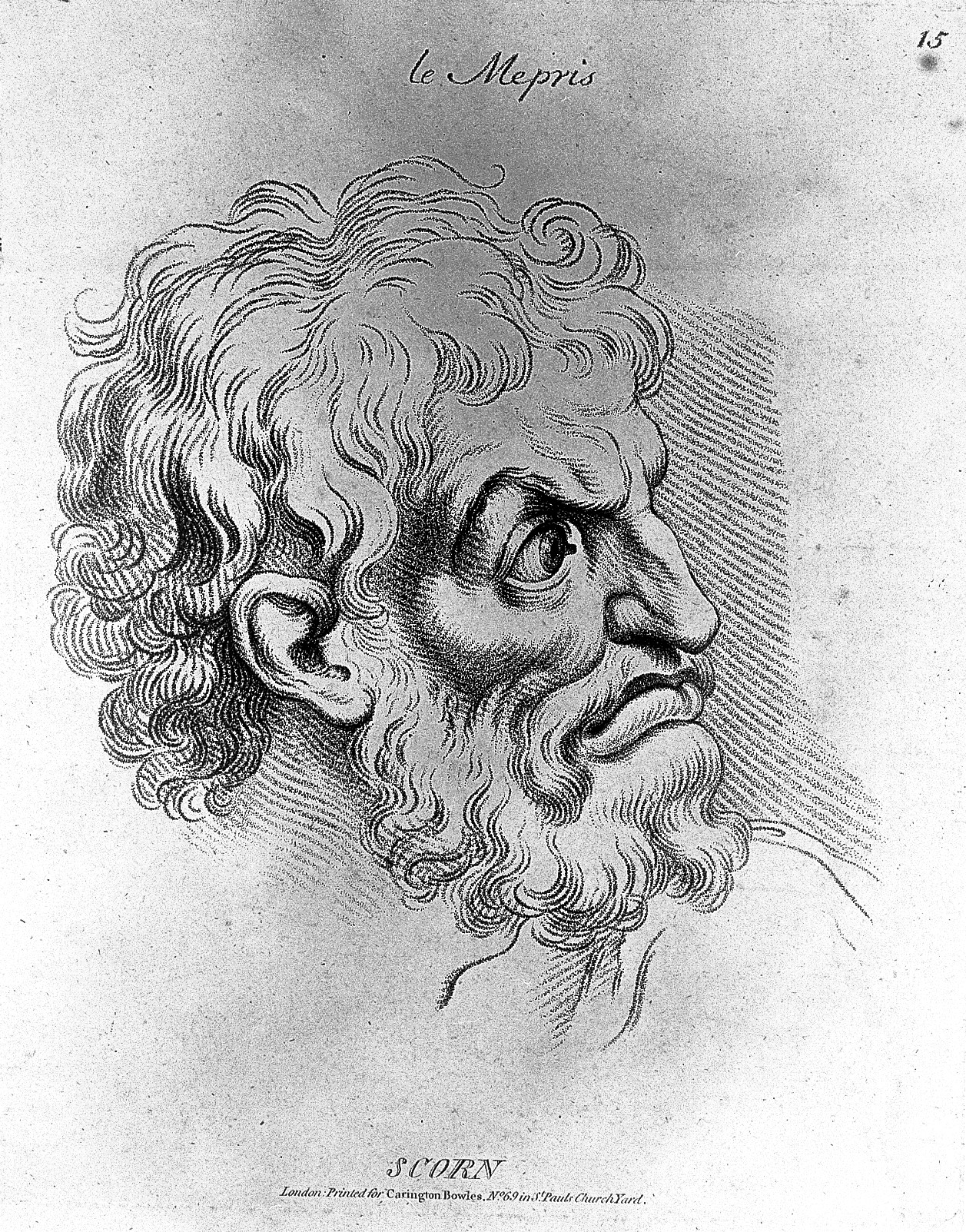
Scorn from Méthode pour apprendre à dessiner les passions

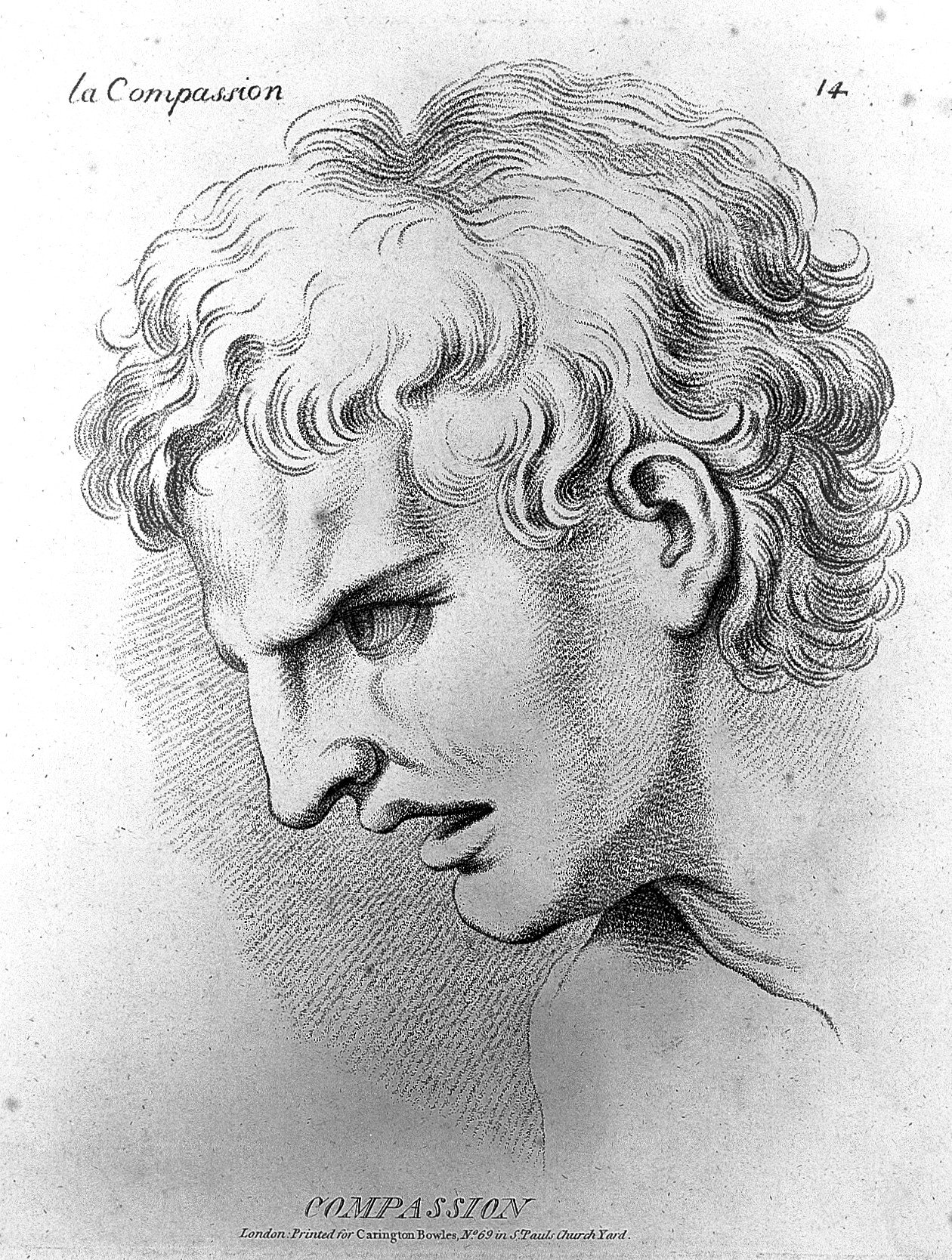
Compassion from Méthode pour apprendre à dessiner les passions

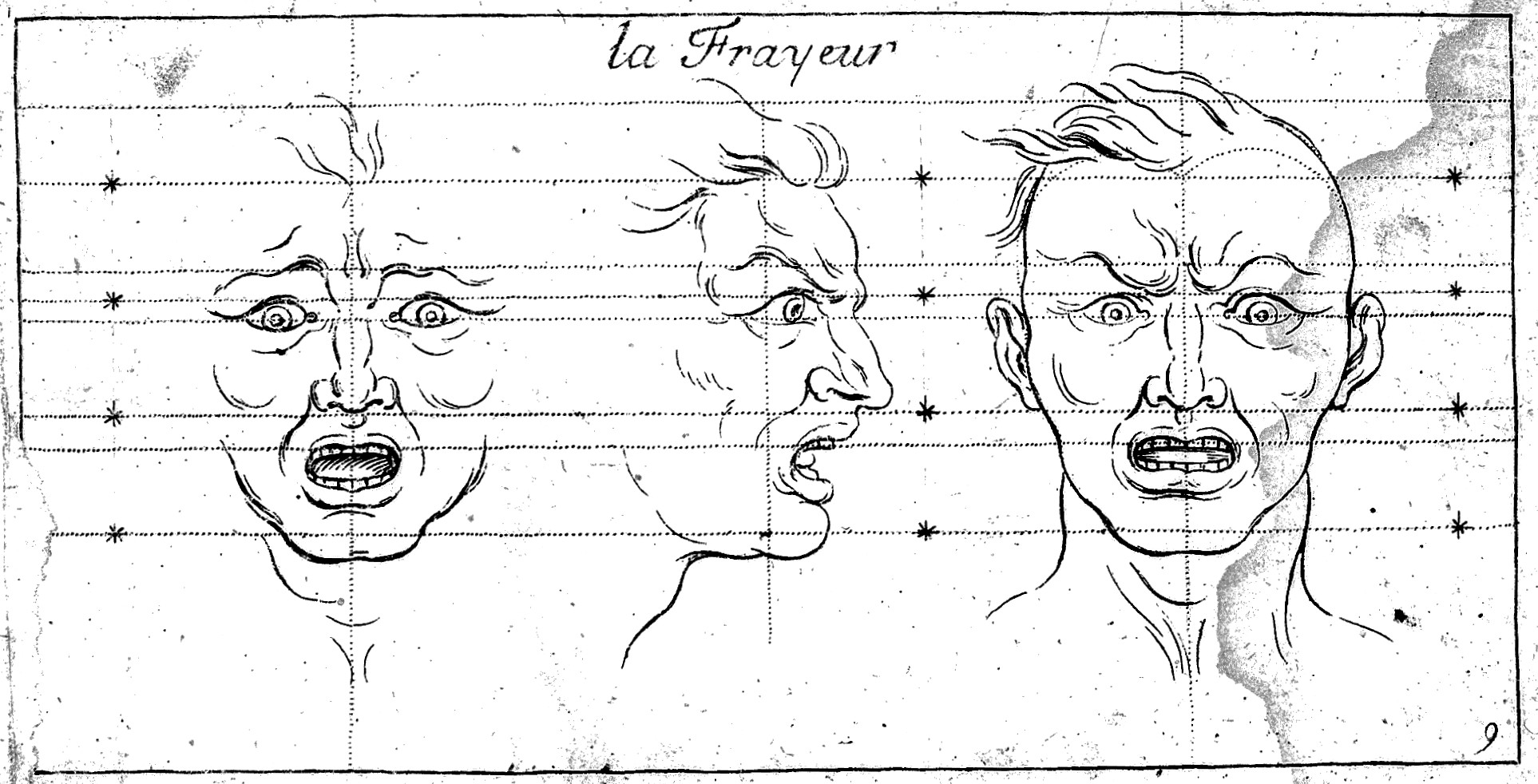
Fear from Méthode pour apprendre à dessiner les passions

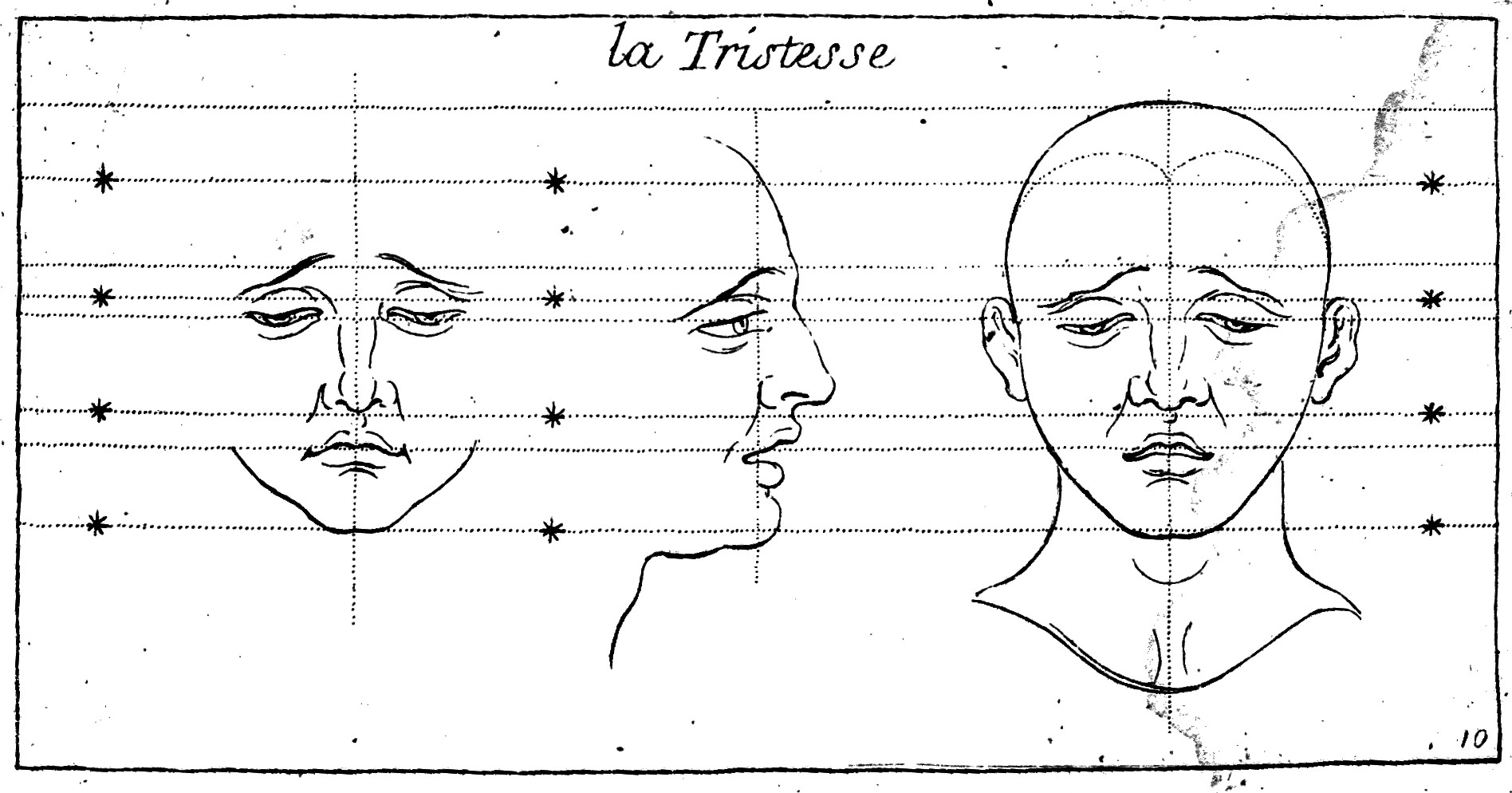
Sadness from Méthode pour apprendre à dessiner les passions

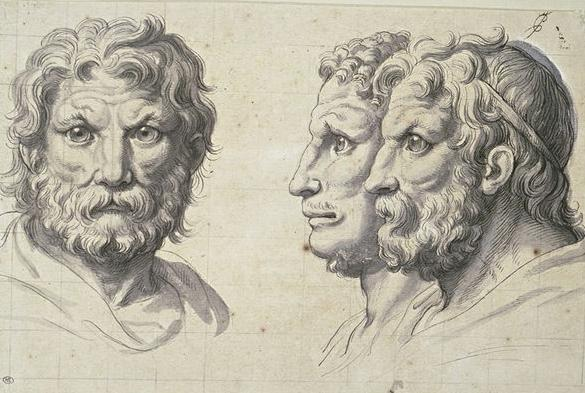
Three lion-like heads, 1671, pen and wash on squared paper
