= The Sacrifice of Polyxena (Charles Le Brun) =

Painting by Charles Le Brun

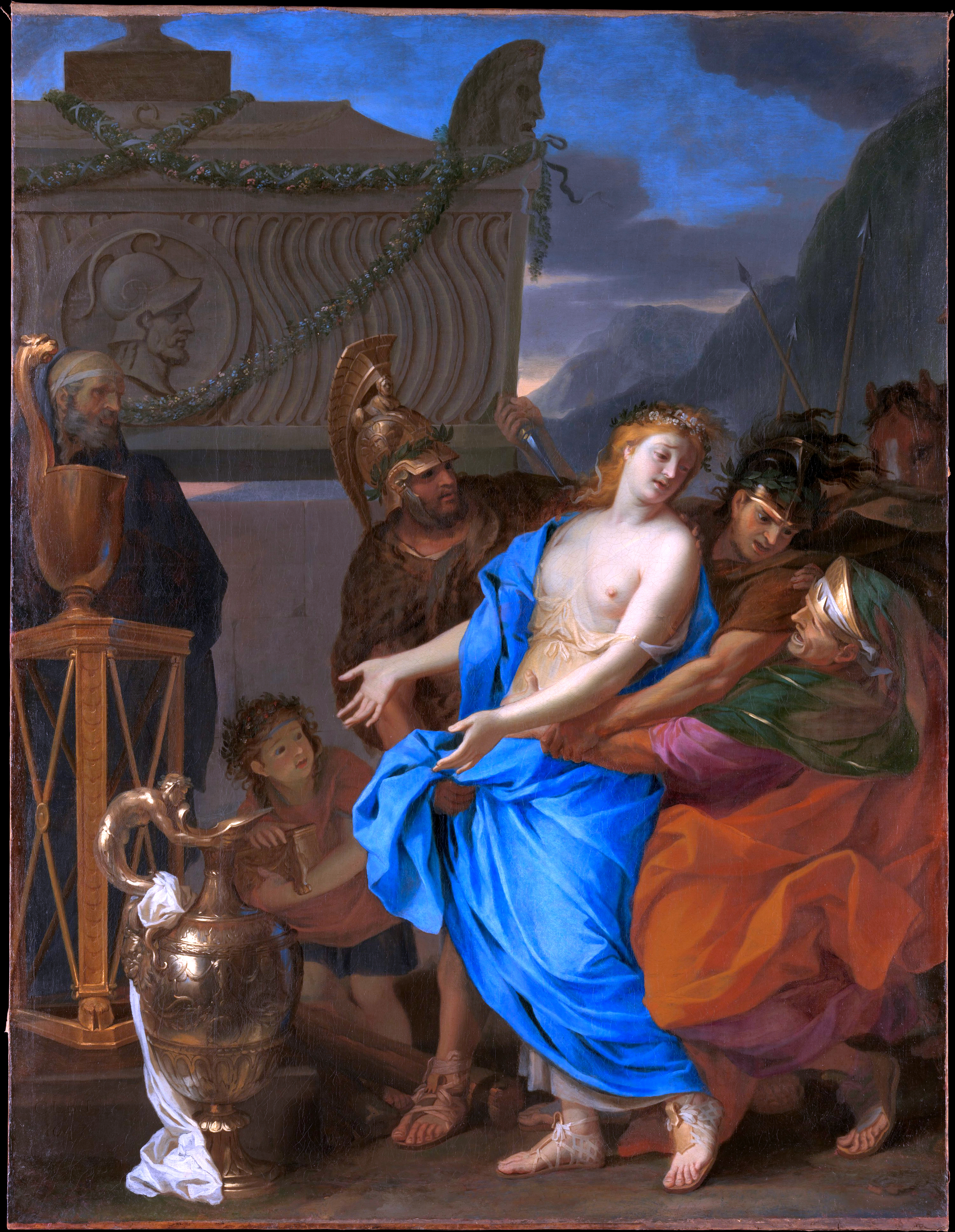
- Artist: Charles Le Brun
- Year: 1647
- Medium: Oil on canvas
- Dimensions: 177.8 cm × 131.4 cm (70.0 in × 51.7 in)
- Location: Metropolitan Museum of Art; New York City

The Sacrifice of Polyxena is a mid 17th century painting by Frenchman Charles Le Brun. Done in oil on canvas, the painting depicts the sacrifice of Polyxena, a Trojan princess killed to appease the ghost of the Greek hero Achilles, who had died in battle against the Trojans. The painting, which is in the collection of the Metropolitan Museum of Art, was well received, and is noted to have been confused with the work of master painter Nicolas Poussin.

== See also ==
- The Sacrifice of Polyxena (Giovanni Francesco Romanelli) - Contemporaneous painting of the same title concerning the same subject.
