= The Sacrifice of Polyxena (Giovanni Francesco Romanelli) =

Painting by Giovanni Francesco Romanelli

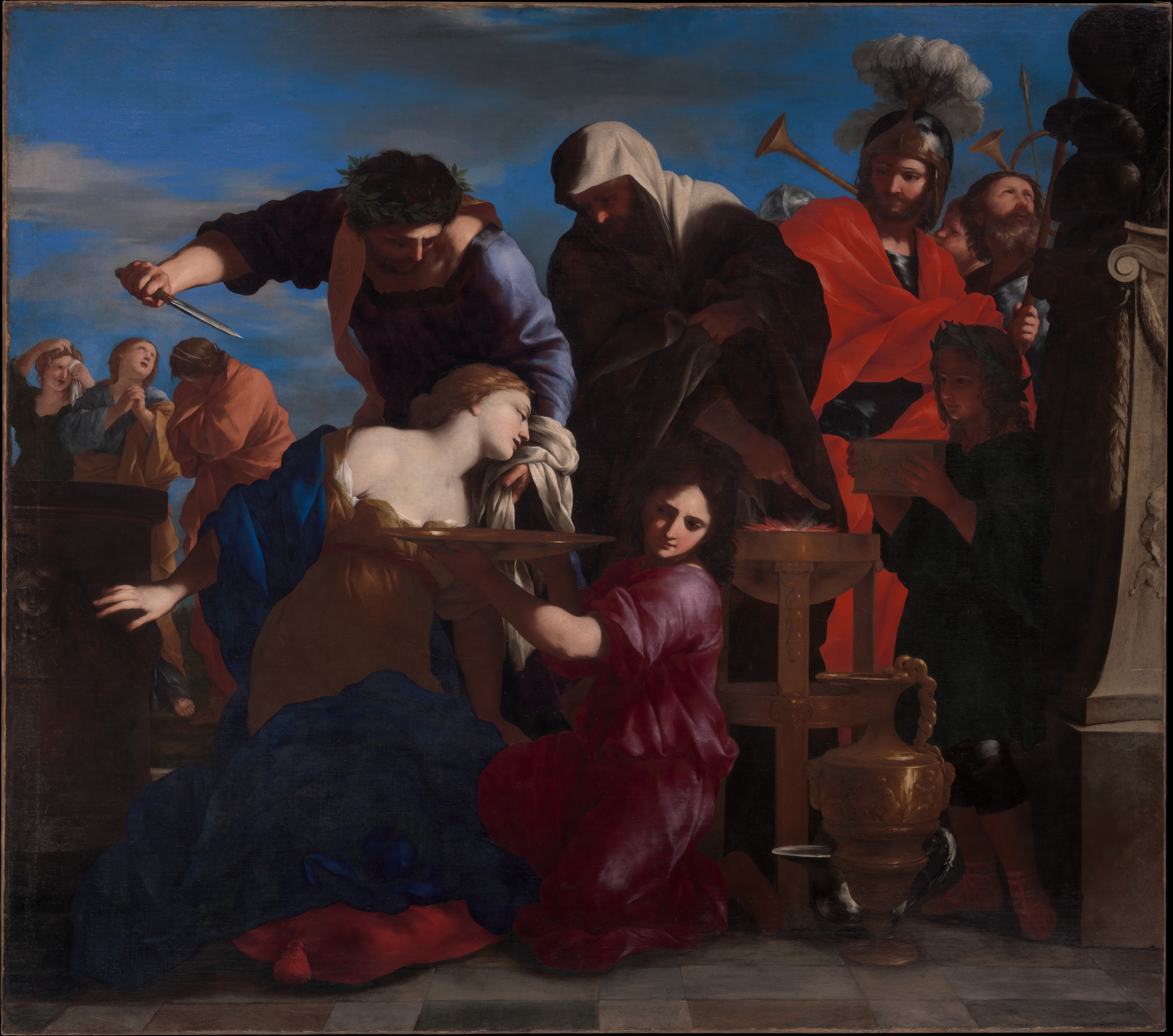
- Artist: Giovanni Francesco Romanelli
- Year: c. 1610-1660
- Dimensions: 197.5 cm × 223.5 cm (77.8 in × 88.0 in)
- Location: Metropolitan Museum of Art; New York

The Sacrifice of Polyxena is a 17th-century painting by Italian artist Giovanni Francesco Romanelli. Done in oil on canvas, the painting depicts the death of Polyxena, a captive Trojan princess sacrificed to appease the ghost of the Greek hero Achilles, who had been killed by the Trojans. The painting is in the collection of the Metropolitan Museum of Art, in New York.

== See also ==
- The Sacrifice of Polyxena (Charles Le Brun) - a contemporary painting of the same title and concerning the same subject.
