= Stockholm Palace =

Official residence of the Swedish monarch

- Stockholms slott
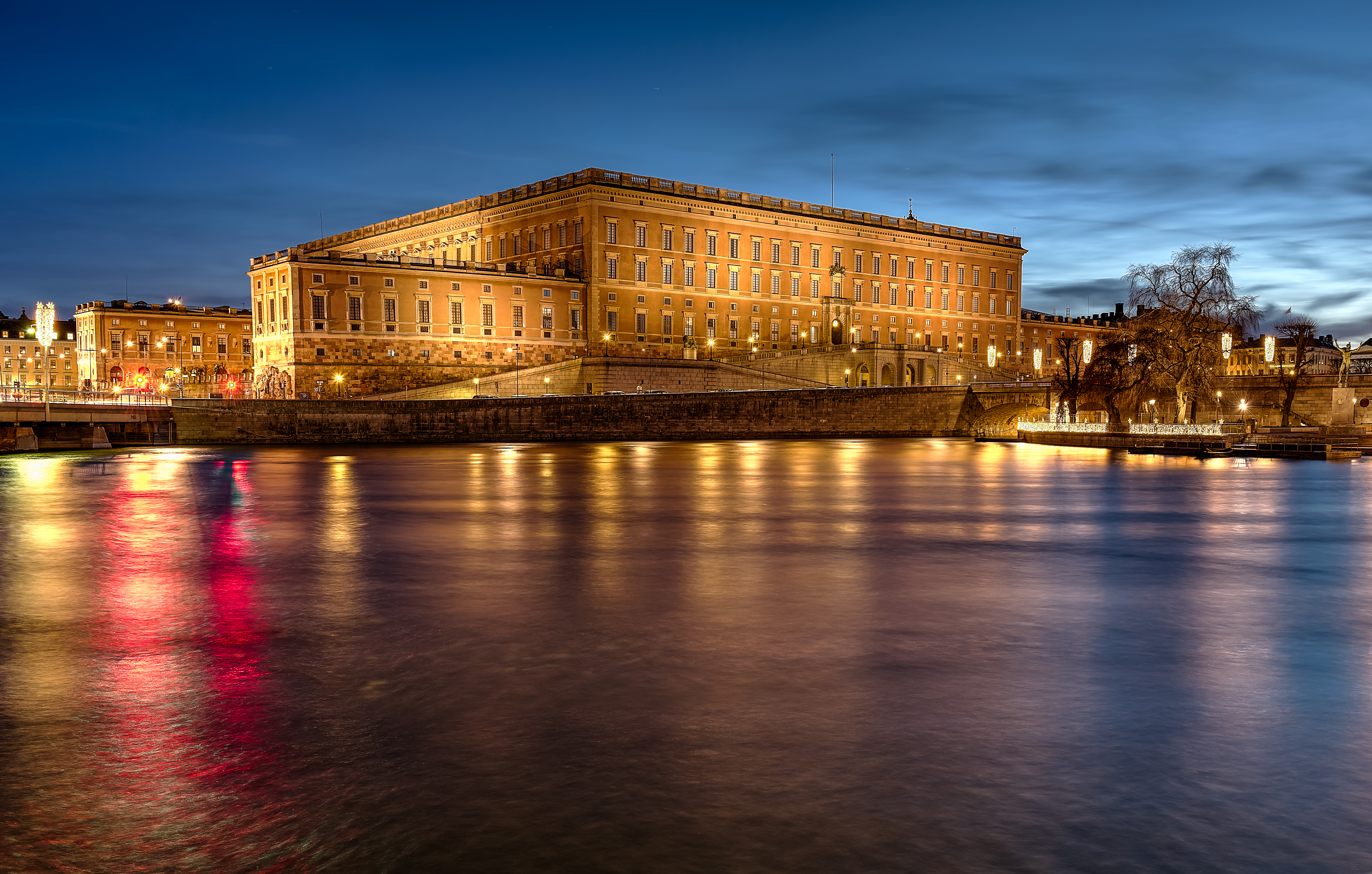
- Stockholm Palace, the Royal Palace

- Location within Stockholm

General information
- Status: In use
- Type: Palace
- Architectural style: Baroque
- Location: Kungliga Slottet; S-111 30 Stockholm, Stockholm, Sweden
- Coordinates: 59°19′37″N 18°04′18″E
- Current tenants: Royal Court of Sweden
- Construction started: 1697
- Completed: 1760; 266 years ago
- Inaugurated: 7 December 1754
- Renovated: Several times, Complete restoration of façades ongoing since 2011 (est. completion for 2050)
- Owner: The Swedish State
- Landlord: National Property Board of Sweden

Dimensions
- Other dimensions: length 230 m (750 ft) width 125 m (410 ft)

Technical details
- Material: brick, sandstone, stone
- Floor count: 3

Design and construction
- Architects: Nicodemus Tessin the Younger; Carl Hårleman
- Designations: Listed buildings in Sweden; No. 21400000339822

Renovating team
- Architect: Andreas Heymowski

Other information
- Number of rooms: 1,430 (2008)

Website
- The Royal Palace

Stockholm Palace, or the Royal Palace, (Swedish: Stockholms slott or Kungliga slottet) is the official residence and major royal palace of the Swedish monarch (King Carl XVI Gustaf and Queen Silvia use Drottningholm Palace as their usual residence). Stockholm Palace is in Stadsholmen, in Gamla stan in the capital, Stockholm. It neighbours the Riksdag building. The offices of the King, the other members of the Swedish royal family, and the Royal Court of Sweden are here. The palace is used for representative purposes by the King whilst performing his duties as the head of state.

This royal residence has been in the same location by Norrström in the northern part of Gamla stan in Stockholm since the middle of the 13th century when Tre Kronor Castle was built. In modern times the name relates to the building called Kungliga Slottet. The palace was designed by Nicodemus Tessin the Younger and erected on the same place as the medieval Tre Kronor Castle which was destroyed in a fire on 7 May 1697. Due to the costly Great Northern War which started in 1700, construction of the palace was halted in 1709, and not recommenced until 1727—six years after the end of the war. When Tessin the Younger died in 1728, the palace was completed by Carl Hårleman who also designed a large part of its Rococo interior. The palace was not ready to use until 1754, when King Adolf Frederick and Queen Louisa Ulrika moved in, but some interior work proceeded until the 1770s. No major conversions have been done in the palace since its completion, only some adjustments, new interiors, modernization and redecorating for different regents and their families, coloration of the façades and addition of the palace museums. The palace is surrounded by the Lejonbacken and the Norrbro to the north, the Logården (known as the Shot Yard in English) and Skeppsbron in the east, the Slottsbacken and the Storkyrkan in the south, and the outer courtyard and Högvaktsterrassen in the northwest.

The interior of the palace consists of 1,430 rooms of which 660 have windows. The palace contains apartments for the Royal families, representation and festivities such as the State Apartments, the Guest Apartments and the Bernadotte Apartments. More features are the Hall of State, the Royal Chapel, the Treasury with the Regalia of Sweden, Livrustkammaren and the Tre Kronor Museum in the remaining cellar vaults from the former castle. The National Library of Sweden was housed in the northeast wing, the Biblioteksflygeln (the Library Wing), until 1878. It also houses the Bernadotte Library. The Slottsarkivet is housed in the Chancery Wing. In the palace are the offices of the Royal Court of Sweden, a place of work for approximately 200 employees. The Royal Guards have guarded the palace and the royal family since 1523. A comprehensive renovation of the façade began in 2011, to repair weather damaged parts made from sandstone. The repairs are estimated to cost approximately 500 million crowns (about US$77 million) over a period of 22 years.

The Royal Palace is owned by the Swedish State through the National Property Board of Sweden which is responsible for running and maintaining the palace, while the Ståthållarämbetet (the Office of the Governor of the Royal Palaces) manages the royal right of disposition of the palace. The palace belongs to the Crown palaces in Sweden which are at the disposition of the King and the Royal court of Sweden.

== History ==
The first building on this site was a fortress with a core tower built in the 13th century by Birger Jarl to defend Lake Mälaren. The fortress grew to a castle, eventually named Tre Kronor for the core tower's spire top decorated with three crowns.

=== Early suggestions ===
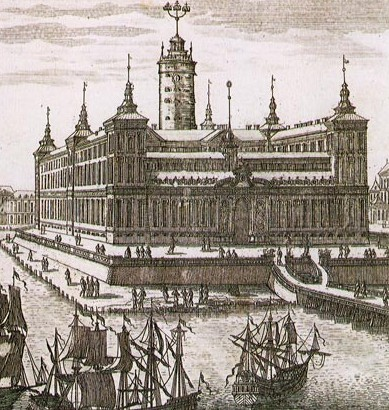
De la Vallée's suggestion from 1654

At the beginning of the 17th century, King Gustavus Adolphus made plans for a new royal palace. The plans came to naught, but in 1651, his daughter Queen Christina appointed Jean de la Vallée to architect for the royal castles, and among his commissions was to make suggestions for how to improve and update the Tre Kronor Castle. Contemporaneous copperplates from 1654 shows de la Vallée's idea of a more visible castle on a raised plateau with a connecting bridge over the Norrström. Queen Christina remodelled and embellished the existing castle extensively, but no new castle was built during her reign.

From 1650 to 1660, Jean de la Vallée made suggestions for large conversions of the castle, but it was not until 1661, when Nicodemus Tessin the Elder became City Architect and Architect for the Royal castles, that more substantial plans for a new castle were made. In 1661, he presented the first draft for a conversion of the northern row which his son, Nicodemus Tessin the Younger, would later rework and realise in 1692 to 1696.

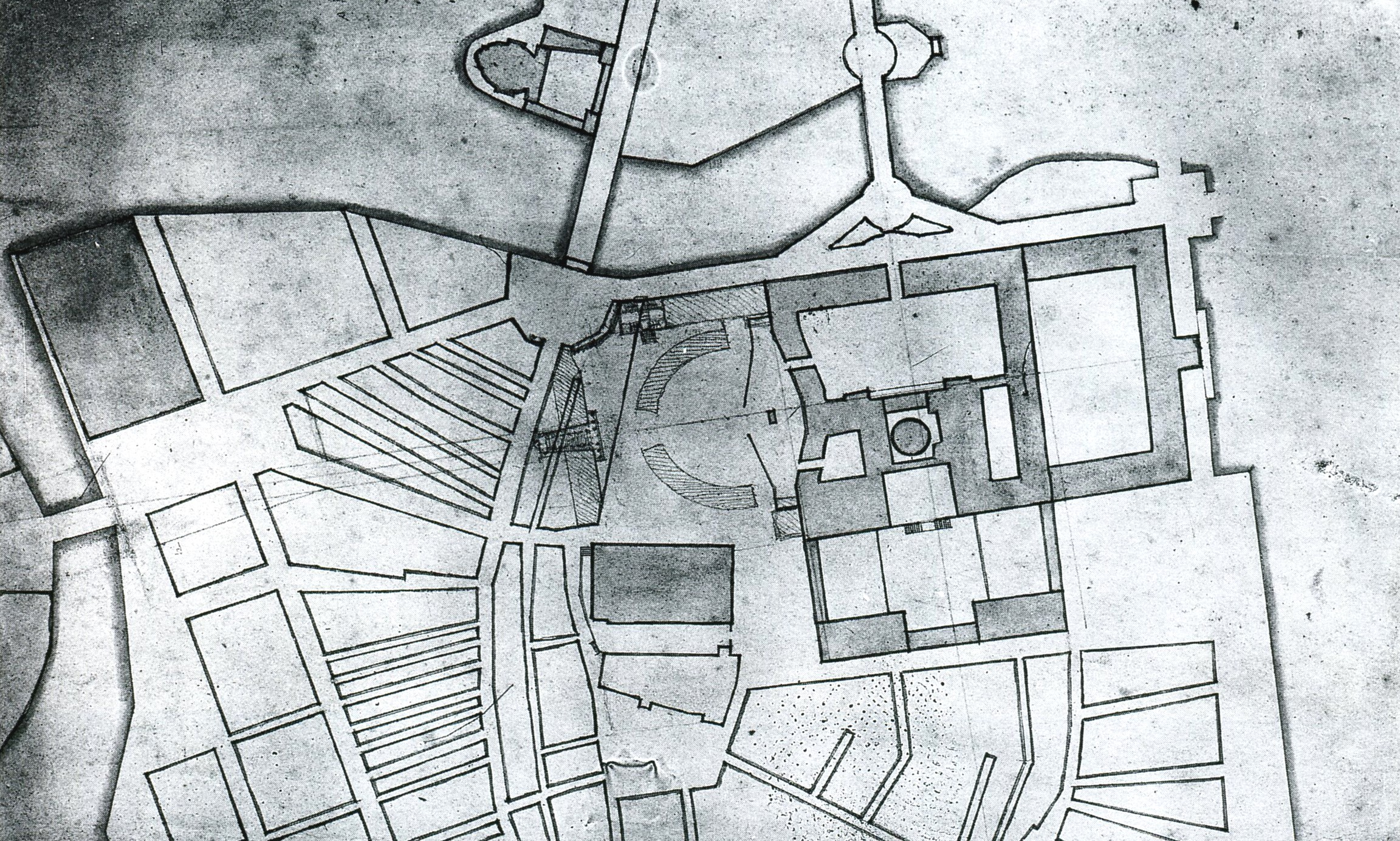
Tessin the Younger's adaptation of the city area west of the palace in the 1650s and 1690s

A map of the Stadsholmen from the 1650s, illustrates de la Vallées suggestion for the conversion of the old castle. The project also brought about an adjustment of the Slottsbacken, making it partially enclosed by buildings. Of interest are Tessin the Younger's additions in pencil on that map, probably made at the end of the 17th century. There is an early sketch for the northern façade's west wing and the two curved wings enclosing the outer courtyard (both executed). Tessin the Younger also made plans for the city area west of the palace with large stairs in false perspective where the Axel Oxenstierna palace, among other buildings, are and joining the Västerlånggatan in addition to a wide street to the present Mynttorget, straight though the city block with the present Brantingtorget (not executed). He had envisioned a line of sight from the center of the palace, westwards to the Riddarholmen.

=== The northern row 1692–1696 ===
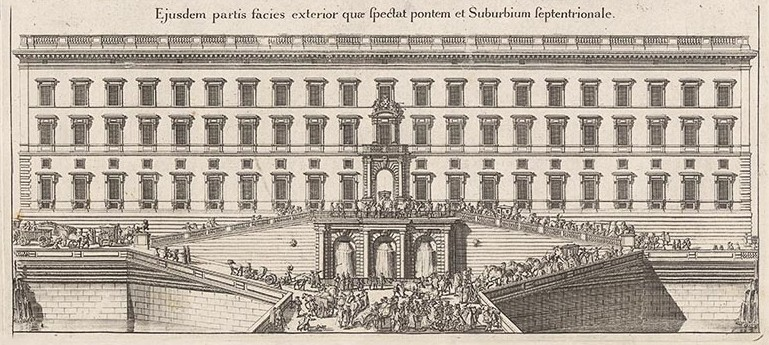
The northern row with the planned Lejonbacken before the fire in 1697. From the Suecia Antiqua et Hodierna.

The northern row of the present palace was built in 1692, in just five months as a part of the old Tre Kronor castle. The new row had the same austere Baroque style that still remain, contrasting with the rest of the Renaissance castle.

At an early stage of the conversion in the 1690s, a number of elderly Swedish artists such as David Klöcker Ehrenstrahl and Johan Sylvius, were still alive and they contributed with artistic work to the completion of the northern row, in particular to the Royal Chapel. Ehrenstrahl made the large religious paintings and Sylvius painted the plafond.

A model for the austere Roman baroque style, including a relatively strict regularity and symmetry, was the Palazzo Farnese in Rome, where the architect in charge of the conversion, Nicodemus Tessin the Younger, went to study buildings in 1688.

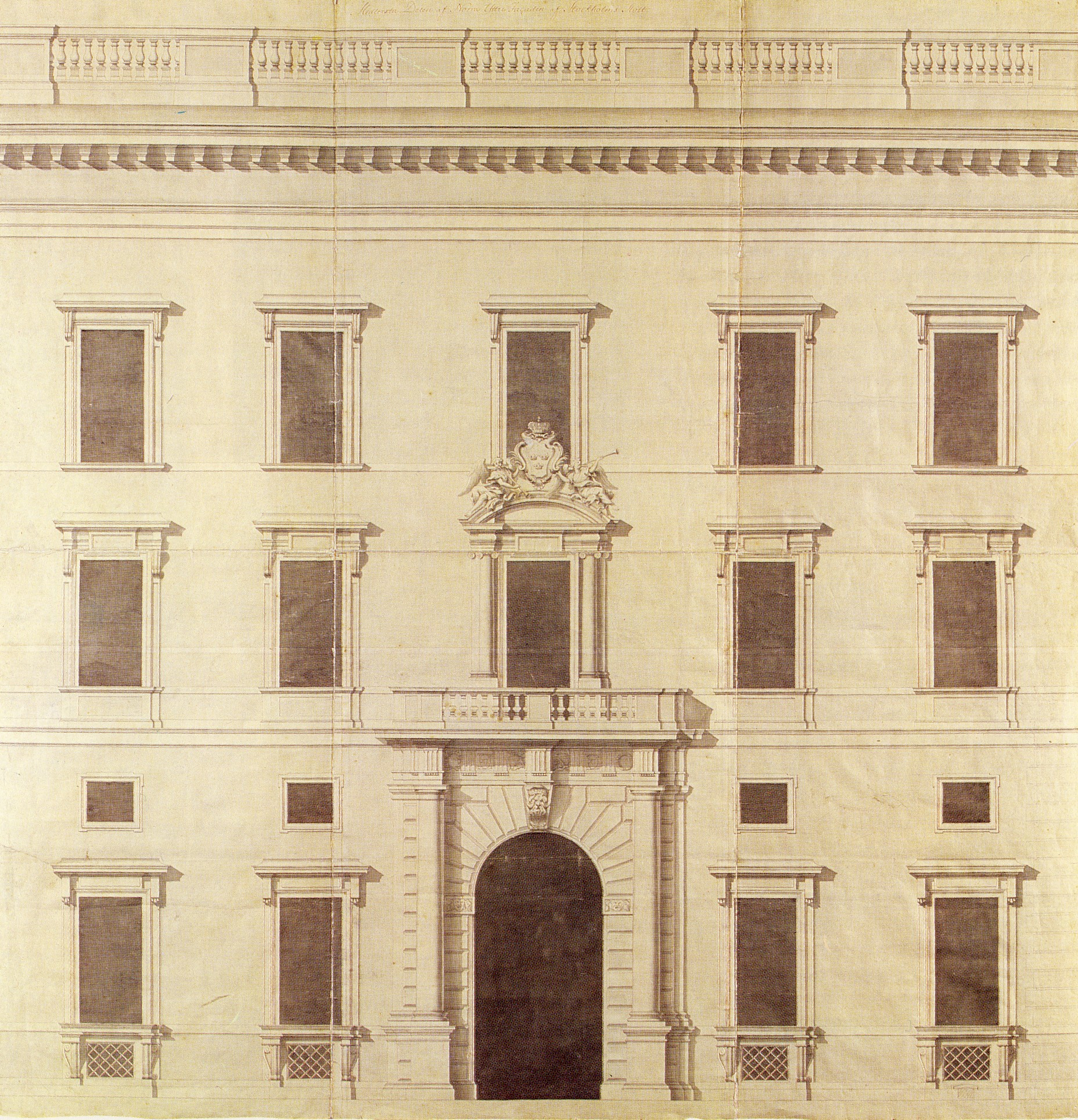
Nicodemus Tessin the Younger's drawing for the central part of the northern façade, c. 1690

The walls surrounding the storages, stables and workshops of the Tre Kronor castle are now behind the Lejonbacken and in the basement of the northern row. Thus, Lejonbacken conceals the old windowless wall behind it. Older walls can also be found higher up in large parts of the northern row's façade walls. The walls from the former northeast and northwest square corner-towers for example, are thicker in this part of the palace's ground floor, since Tessin re-used the remaining walls and incorporated them in the new palace. About half of the old walls were used in that manner, since the ever frugal Charles XI had only reluctantly agreed to the conversion which started in 1690. Thrift and recycling were guiding principles at the building of the northern row. Hence, the construction proceeded rather quickly and after five months the new row was topped out and roofed. The new walls became higher than the old ones, except for the towers which were completely enclosed in the new walls. The Charles XI's Gallery is one more feature remaining since before the fire, all according to Tessin's plan.

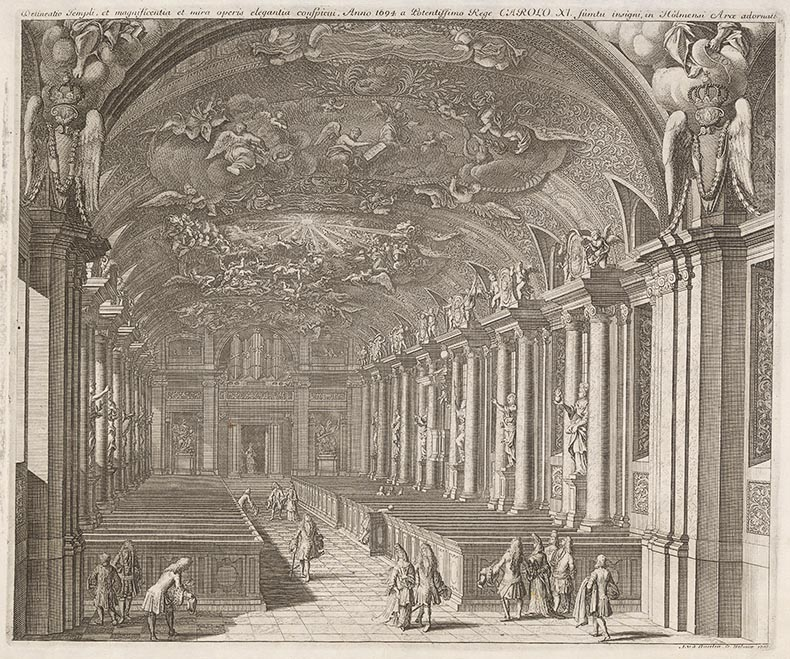
The Royal Chapel in 1694

A new Royal Chapel in the northern row was inaugurated at Christmas in 1696, and a new Hall of State was also planned there. The chapel was to replace the old castle chapel that had been erected by John III in the same location by the old storages and stables at the Tre Kronor castle.

Building the new chapel with the same proportions as the old one and making it fit within the walls of the old chapel, with a retained high ceiling inside the walls of the former northeast tower (now the northeast corner of the palace), proved difficult for Tessin if he was to be able to adhere to the austere Baroque style where all the windows ought to be the same size, and placed in precise rows despite what rooms were behind them. To achieve this, Tessin added a mezzanine floor with smaller square windows just above the lower row of windows. These smaller windows now encircle the whole building, a remnant of the first castle chapel. After the fire, when Tessin could make more substantial alterations, the Royal Chapel and the Hall of State were placed in the southern row instead, and the furniture and inventories, such as benches, household silver and decorations are to some extent preserved in the present-day Royal Chapel.

According to a plan from before the fire, the palace was to be in a square shape without any wings in austere Roman Baroque style, essentially with the rest of the rows looking like the northern row. This suggestion is not preserved, historian Boo von Malmborg suggests that this was probably because Tessin did not dare to present his comprehensive plans to the economical Charles XI.

The new building is depicted in five engravings in the Suecia Antiqua et Hodierna printed in 1695 to 1702: picture No. I.19 the new northern façade of the castle including the Lejonbacken and the square courtyard, picture No. I.20 the new chapel's interior, picture No. I.21 the chapel's exterior, picture No. I.27 view of the Hedvig Eleonora Church and picture No. I.32 view from the Kungsträdgården. Lejonbacken, which was to lead up to the north gate from the east as well as from the west, was never completed before the fire and is only mentioned in the drawings.

=== The palace fire in 1697 ===
On 7 May 1697, a great castle fire occurred, prompting the building of the present Stockholm Palace. The fire ruined most of the earlier fortress, the Tre Kronor Castle, except for the sturdy, recently constructed walls of the northern row, most of which are still standing. Unlike the rest of the castle, the walls of the northern row could be repaired.

=== The first phase of building the new palace 1697–1709 ===
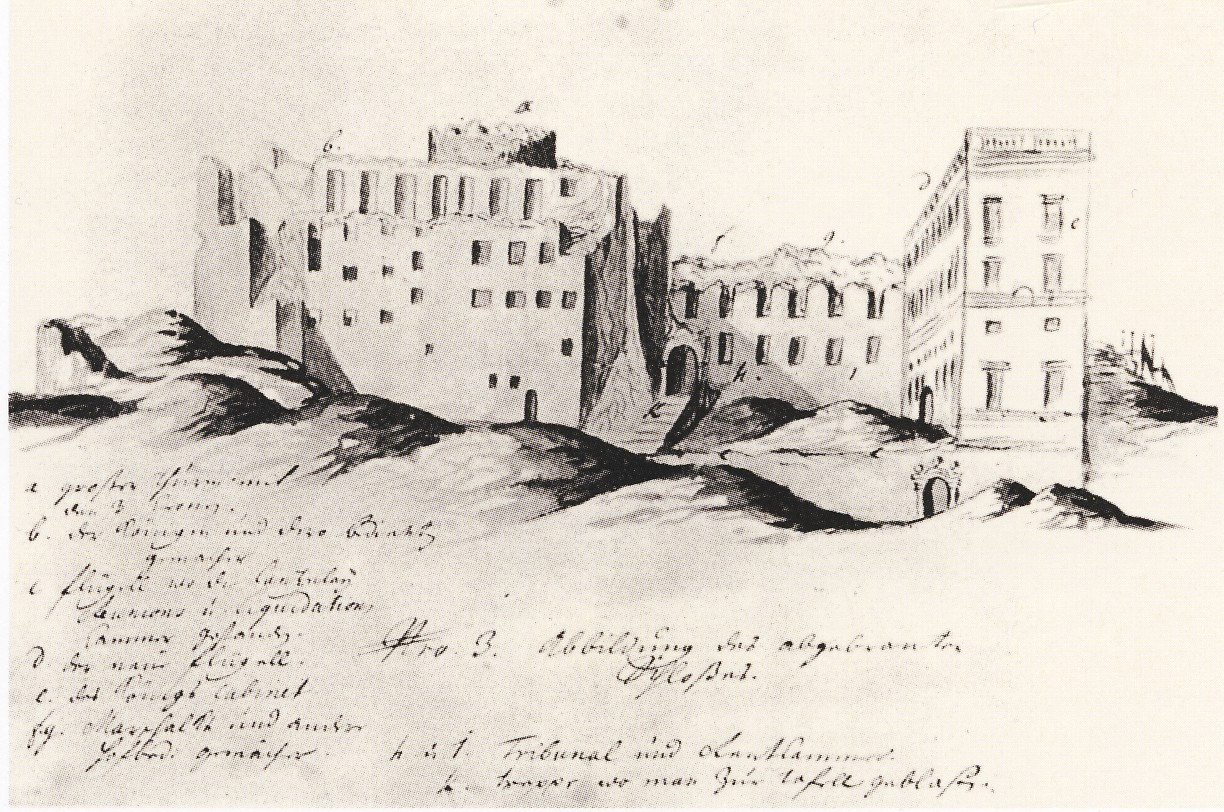
The remains of the Tre Kronor Castle after the fire in 1697, the northern row is still standing (to the right)

After the fire, the Regency Council of King Charles XII under the direction of the Queen dowager Hedvig Eleonora of Holstein-Gottorp at the Karlberg Palace that a new castle should be built on the walls of the burnt castle. Nicodemus Tessin the Younger was the architect appointed to draw and build the new Stockholm Palace. At the same time that Tessin's plans were approved, he was appointed head of the construction of the palace as part of his new position: Överintendent över de Kungliga Slotten (Superintendent of the Royal Castles), a kind of castle architect. Göran Josuæ Törnquist (later ennobled Adelcrantz) became the Assisting intendent and his deputy, an important position at the construction site, and Hans Conradt Buchegger became general contractor for the palace construction. In 1697, Abraham Winantz Svanssköld, Tessin's half-brother, was appointed deputy castle and court architect. Together with Tessin he was active at the palace construction, and they were helped by several German journeymen. Important sculptors and craftsmen during the first years of the construction were, among others, René Chauveau, Bernard Foucquet the Elder and his son Jacques Foucquet.

Tessin presented the first finished plans for the new palace within the year of the fire. First, the remnants of the old castle were razed, practically everything was demolished save for parts of the northern row with its strict Baroque, that were still standing. The demolishing was performed by approximately 300 men from mid-May 1697 to mid-spring in 1700, when the remains of the old keep Tre Kronor were re-used as filling for the Lejonbacken. Consequently, most of the material for the new palace was new.

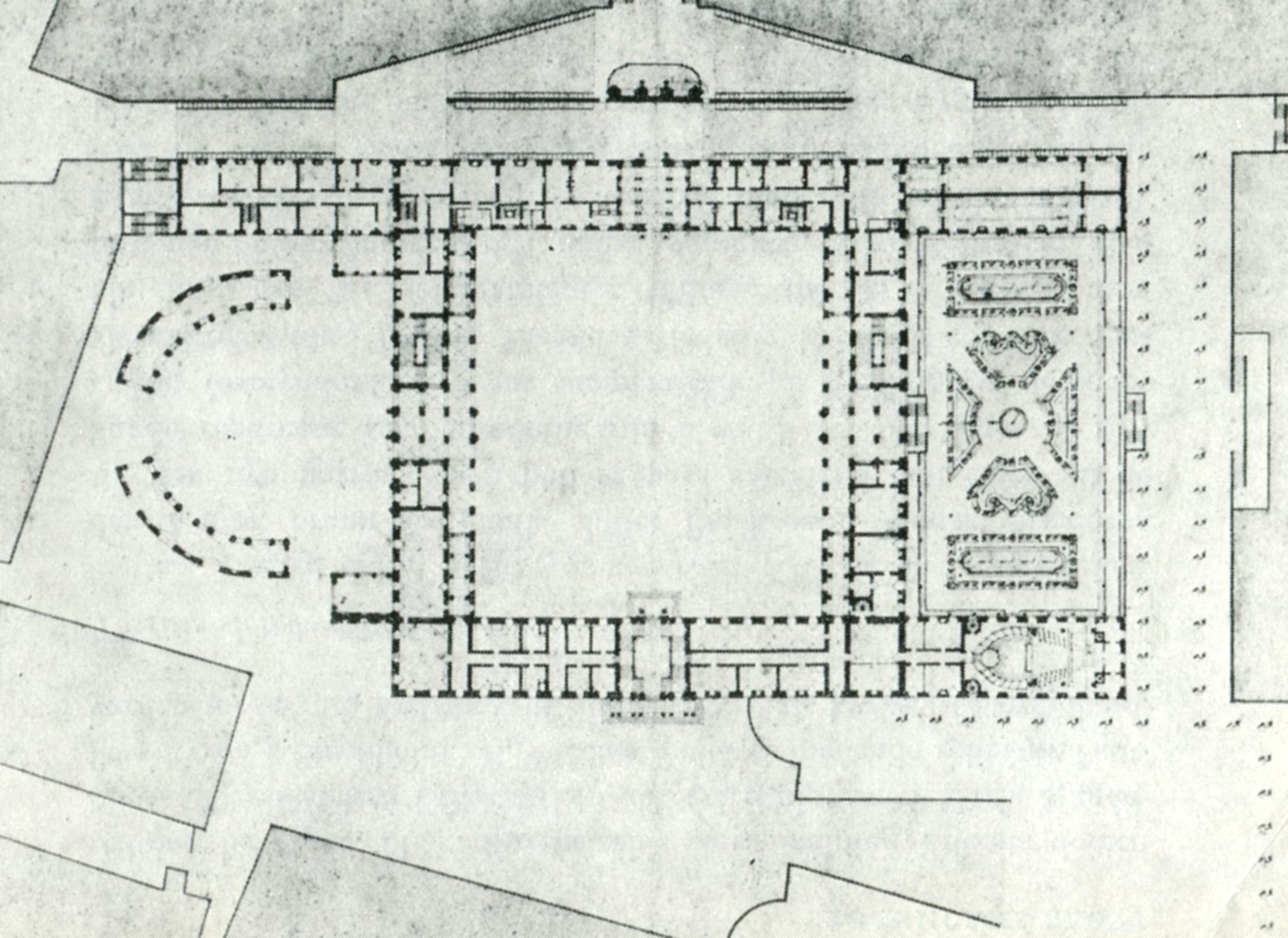
Tessin's finished plan, 1697

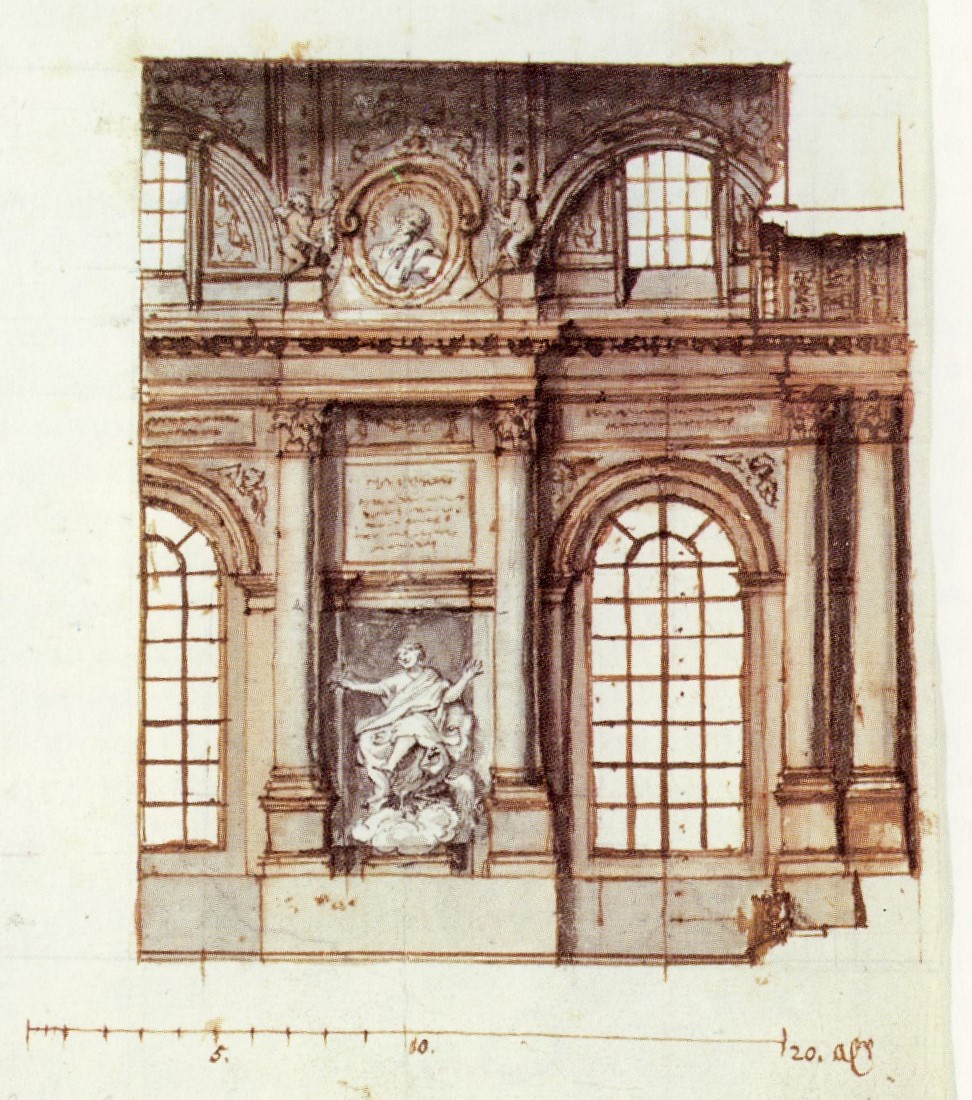
Tessin's sketch for the Royal Chapel, 1698

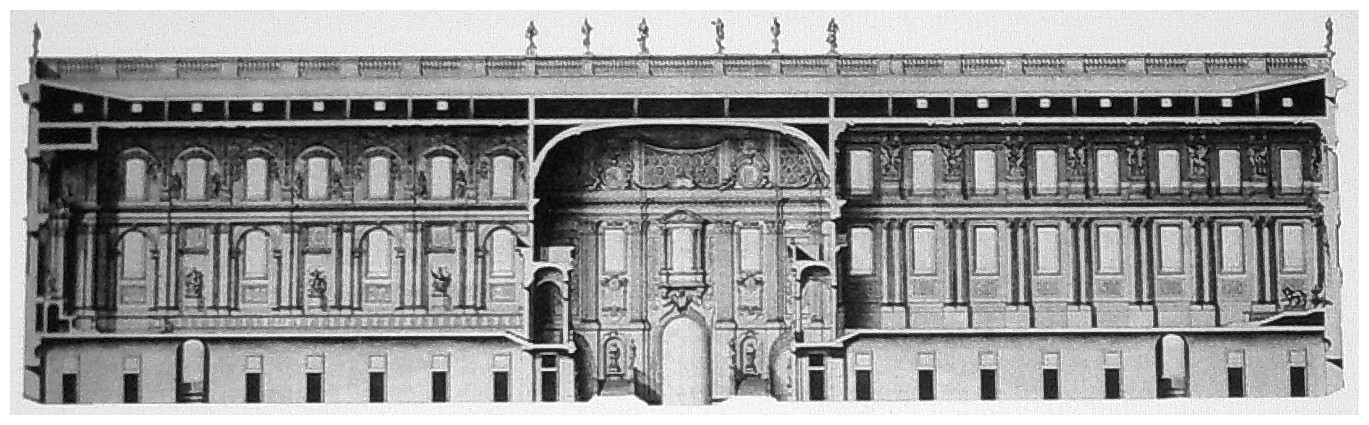
Tessin's cross-section of the southern row with the Hall of State to the left and the Royal Chapel to the right, c. 1700

When Tessin got the commission to design the new palace, he abandoned parts of his earlier plan about building a square palace and added the lower wings flanking the palace in the east and west.

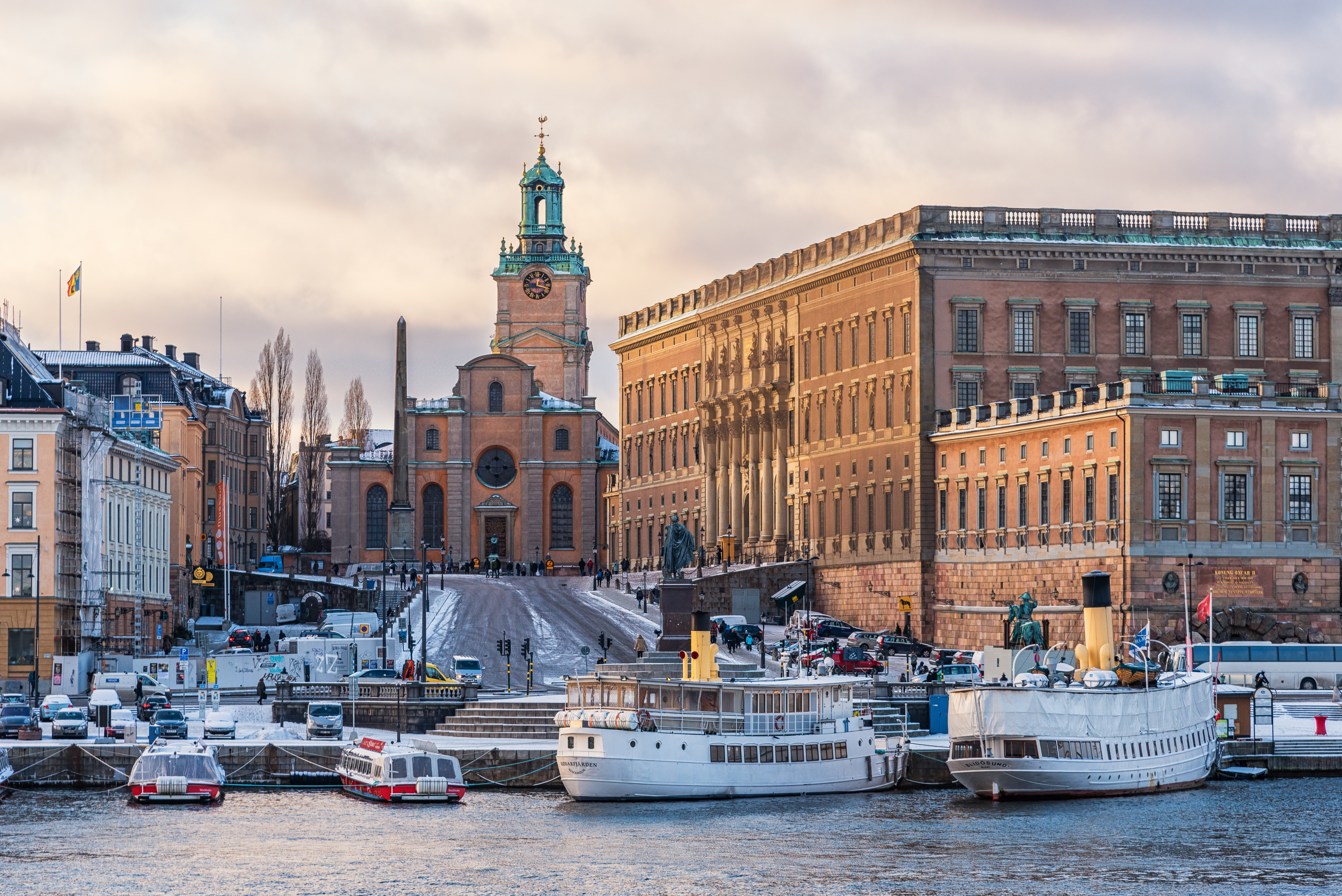
Storkyrkan and Stockholm Palace in 2016

This was made to give the palace a more monumental look and this could be executed since there was now more open land in which to expand the palace such as the western area where King Gustav Vasa's moat and cannon mounds had previously been. The southwest wing had to be made shorter since the Storkyrkan was in the way. This asymmetry, created by the different lengths of the wings, was compensated by adding the two detached, semicircular wings for the Royal guards and the Commanders, west of the main building. These wings encircle the courtyard. Tessin's plans and commissions to artists still characterizes the façades, walls and stone pilasters as well as walls, floors, pillars and pilasters inside the palace, such as in the Hall of State, the Royal Chapel and the stairwells.

The building of the palace went on with great intensity during the reign of Charles XII, but the costly campaigns during the Great Northern War were impedimental. Charles XII lost at the Battle of Poltava in 1709, and that year the building of the palace came to a complete halt. At that time, the courtyard had been leveled and the courtyard walls were erected to the height of one floor in the south and east part and half a floor in the west part. The palace remained in that semi-finished state until 1727, when the Riksdag granted funds to continue the work. This was one year before Tessin died.

Some embellishments in Tessin's plans were never made. For example, he wanted to place an equestrian statue of King Charles XI in the inner courtyard in the French fashion at that time, but King Charles XII disliked that and rejected the idea since it would "totally obscure the beautiful prospect". Neither did Tessin's suggestion to embellish the roof balustrade with sculptures. Tessin's vision for this can be seen on an illustration of the palace made by Jean Eric Rehn about 1770.

==== The French artists' colony ====
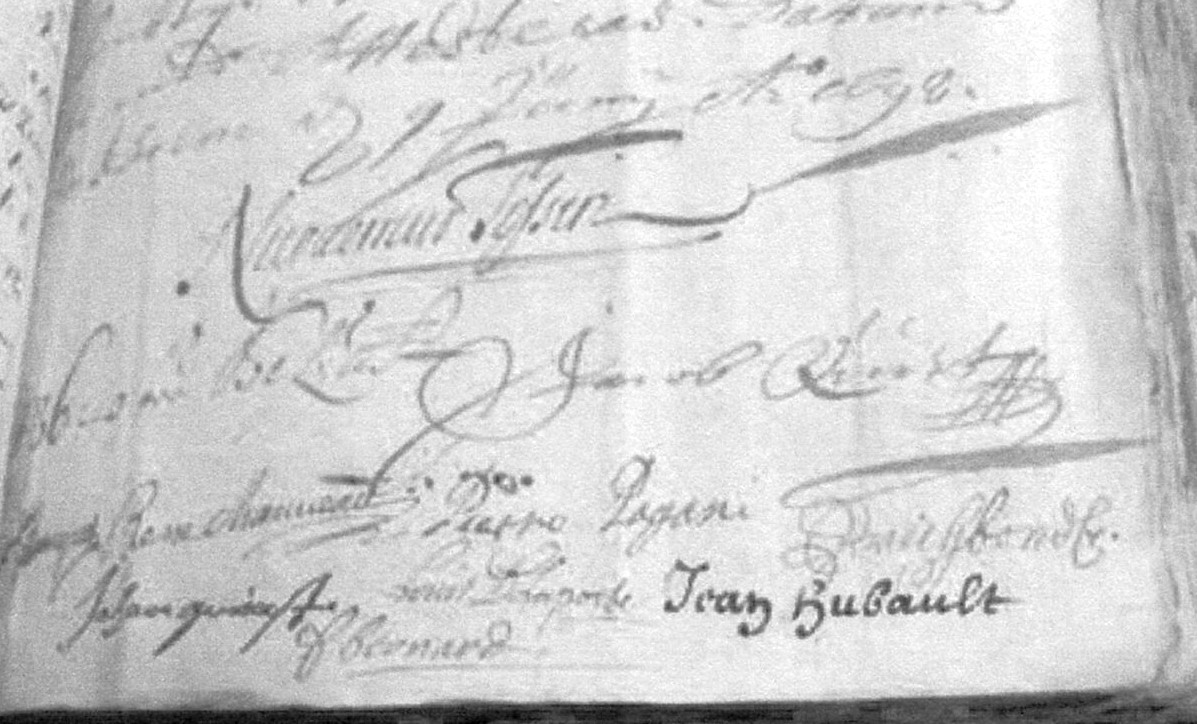
Quittances for salaries paid, among the names is "Nicodemus Tessin", c. 1700

The largest group of artists came from France. Between the years 1693 and 1699, sixteen French masons, painters and foundrymen arrived at Stockholm. At Tessin's initiative, the craftsmen had received an invitation through the Swedish diplomatic envoy in Paris, Daniel Cronström, to come and work for the Swedish king. They were offered yearly wages and accommodations. The sculptor René Chauveau started out with a salary of 1,000 riksdaler (approximately equal to US$49,550 in 2014) per year; he was among the highest paid in the group. Some artists had brought their families with them and they formed a French artists' colony. The family members often participated in the construction work. The whole group is referred to as de fransöske hantwerkarne (the French craftsmen). Most of them had received their education at the Académie royale de peinture et de sculpture in Paris and had worked at King Louis XIV's large palace construction at Versailles. Most of the craftsmen were Catholic, and they lived and worked in a very tight-knit community close to the French embassy in Stockholm. They could practice their Catholic faith within the colony, but this was strictly forbidden in the rest of Sweden at that time. When to building of the palace came to a halt in 1709, the colony was dissolved. Some craftsmen, such as René Chauveau and his family, returned to France, but most of them remained in Sweden until they died during the first part of the 18th century.

=== Tessin's plan for the palace surroundings ===
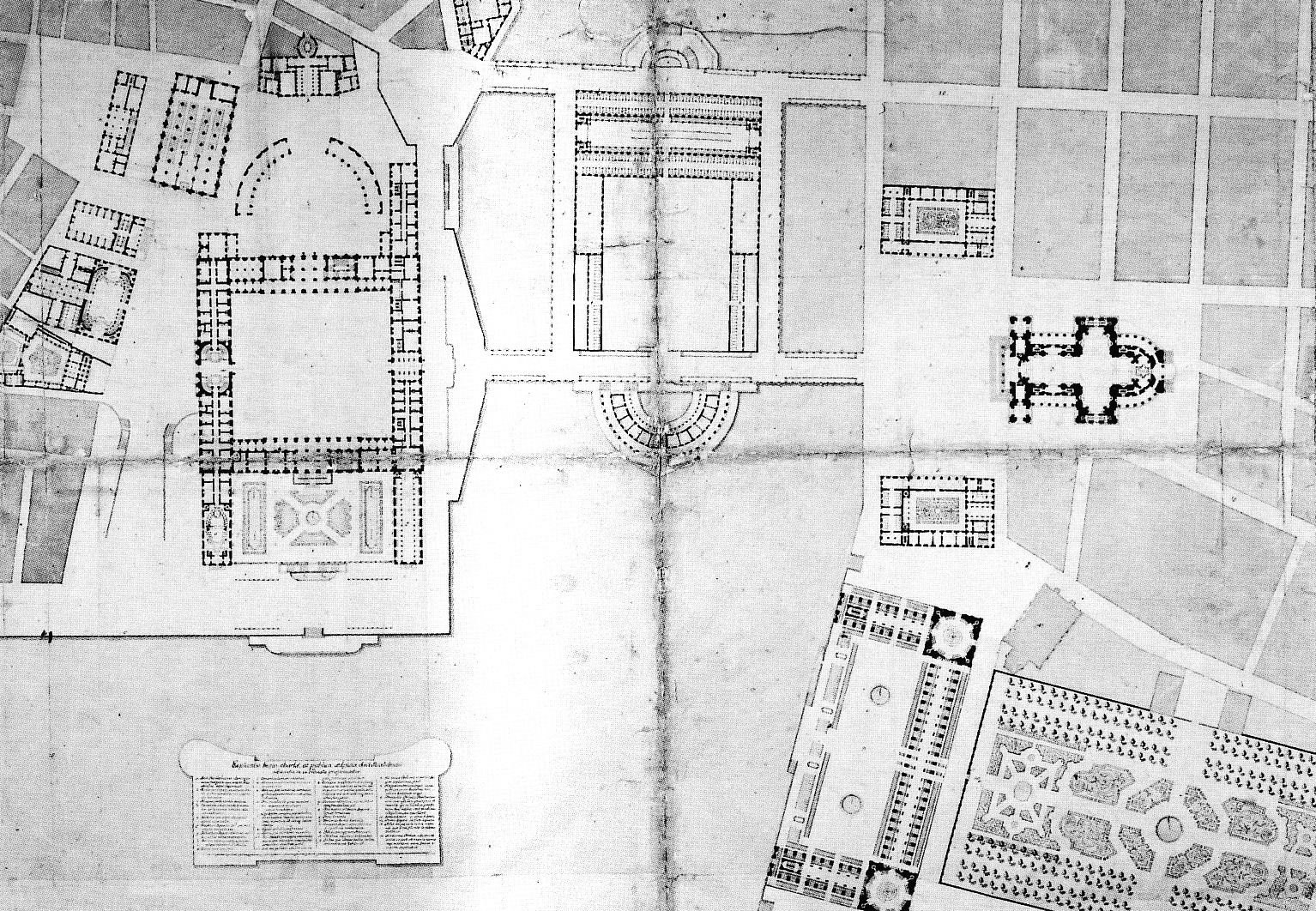
Tessin the Younger's suggestion from 1713 (north to the right)

Alterations of the land-use plan for the area surrounding the Stockholm Palace had been proposed during the beginning of the 1700s, by the superintendent Nicodemus Tessin the Younger. Tessin's plans for the city was finished in 1713, and in those the area surrounding the palace were given a new shape. A new Norrbro with rows of sculptures, a great royal cathedral and new Riddarholm Church resembling the St. Peter's Basilica in Rome. Facing the Stockholms ström in an extension of the Kungsträdgården, Tessin envisioned a 112 metres (367 ft) long "victory hall" with arcades and columns in a doric order, featuring two corner towers and exhibition halls with 50 metres (160 ft) headroom. There would be displayed cannons taken as booty, flags and other trophies of war. At the Helgeandsholmen he planned a horse racing stadium for equestrian games and other forms of entertainments, a bear-garden was also to be built. The ideas were not approved by King Charles XII who wanted the Helgeandsholmen for himself.

Ramps were to be built on the Slottsbacken leading up to a narrowing area in front of the Storkyrkan, which was to be redressed in a new baroque façade. The Stortorget was also to be rebuilt and a new city hall and stock exchange was planned. Tessin was convinced that his plans would one day be realized, but building the new palace kept him fully occupied and demanded great financial resources. The time of the Swedish Empire was coming to an end and all the great plans remained unfulfilled.

=== The second phase of building the new palace 1727–1771 ===
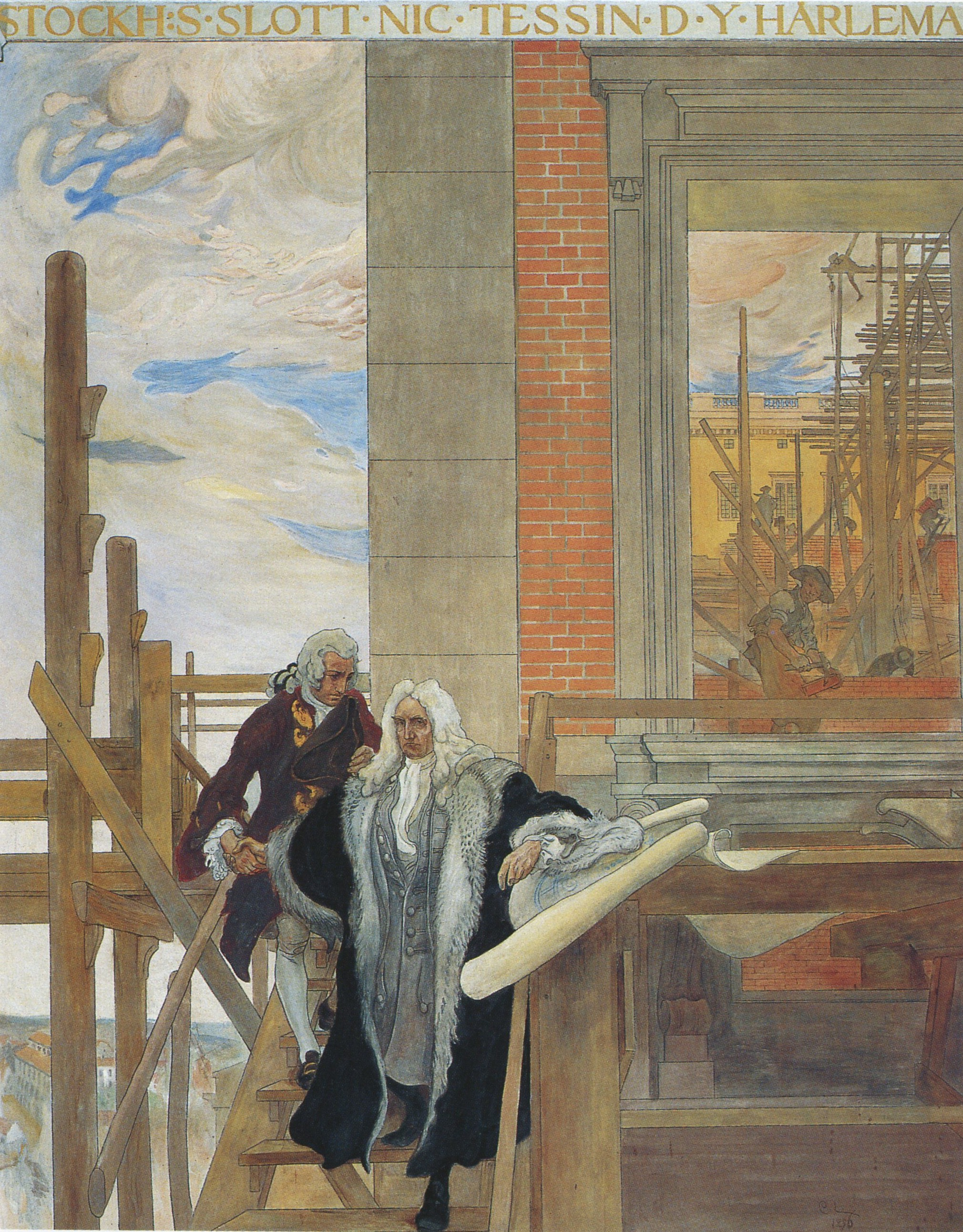
Hårleman and Tessin at the building site, an interpretation by Carl Larsson, 1896

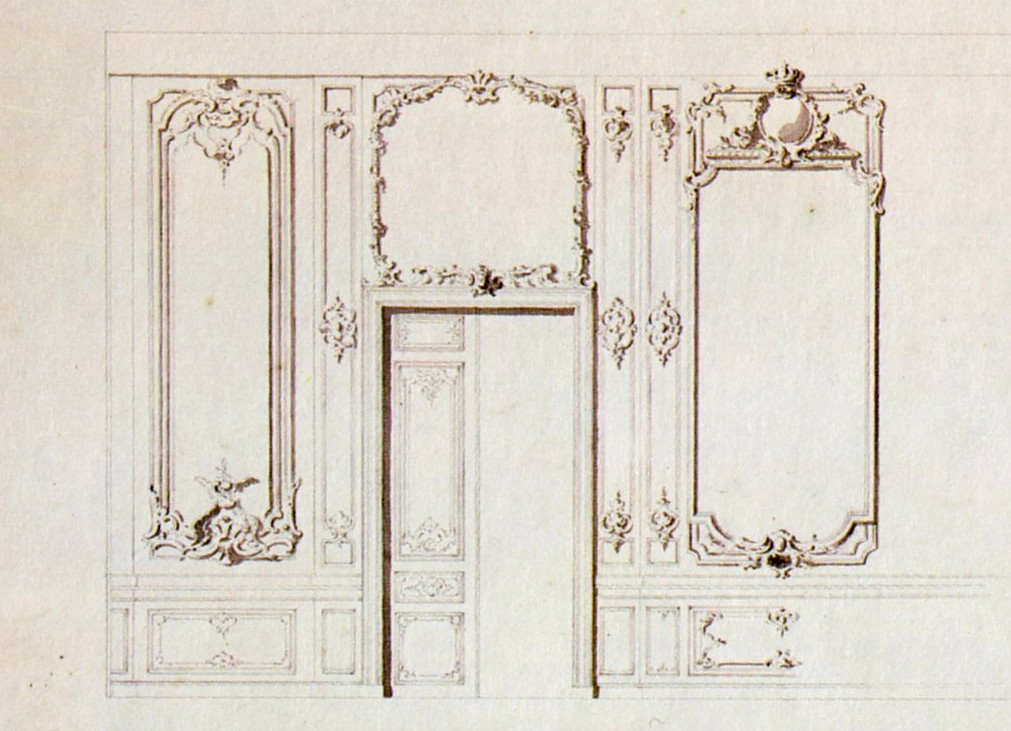
Carl Hårleman's sketch of a wall in the Prince Gustaf's audience room, 1750

Nicodemus Tessin the Younger died in 1728, before the palace was finished. The responsibility for the construction was taken over by Carl Hårleman, even though Tessin's position as superintendent was formally passed on to his son Carl Gustaf Tessin.

Hårleman formed large parts of the palace's interior in a newer style, more to the taste of that time, the Rococo. At Hårleman's initiative, the color of the façade was changed from the earlier brick red to light yellow (see Coloration below). When the building was reassumed in 1727, there was anew a need for qualified workers. The second group of French artists and craftsmen arrived in Stockholm in the summer of 1732, as a result of Hårleman's negotiations in Paris the previous winter. The group consisted of six persons: two Masters, Antoine Bellette and Michel Le Lievre and four journeymen. Other noted sculptors and craftsmen during the second phase of the construction were Charles Guillaume Cousin, Jacques-Philippe Bouchardon, Pierre Hubert L'Archevêque, Johan Tobias Sergel and Adrien Masreliez. Giovanni Battista Tiepolo turned down Tessin's offer of a commission.

Carl Hårleman died in 1753, and his work was continued by Carl Johan Cronstedt and Carl Gustaf Tessin who finished the palace together. Some parts of the palace where the royal family would live, the northern row and what is presently the State Apartments, were also completed that year. The Stockholm Palace was ready to be used in 1754. The royal family who had lived in the Wrangel Palace on Riddarholmen since the fire in the old castle, moved to their new residence on the First Advent that same year. Instead of living in the State Apartment, the royal family choose to stay in the part now known as the Bernadotte Apartments. The work on the interior continued even after the royal family had settled in. Priority was given to the interior rather than the completion of the Slottsbacken and Lejonbacken.

Lejonbacken and the Chancery Wing were finished by architect Carl Fredrik Adelcrantz, who also was put in charge for the work on the interior after Hårleman's death. 1771 is considered the year when the palace was officially declared finished. The wall of the eastern quay was completed that year, but during a number of years many of the statues and sculptures in the façade's niches were still lacking, such as the eight statues on the southern façade depicting noted Swedish men and the Enleveringsgruppen (the Abduction group) on the same façade.

=== Development after the 1770s ===
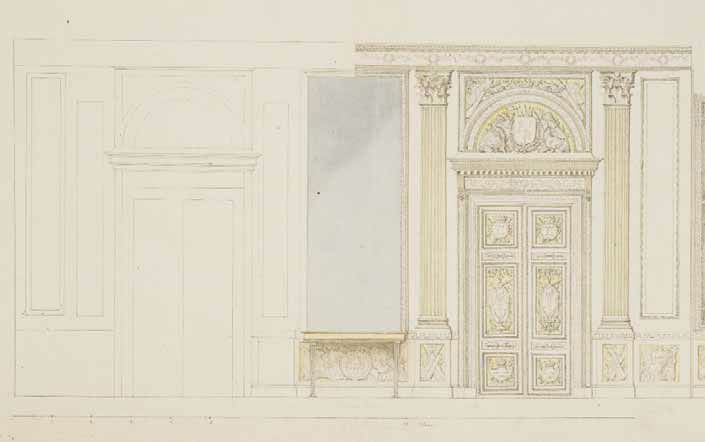
Louis Masreliez's drawing for the Duke Carl's cabinet hall, 1792

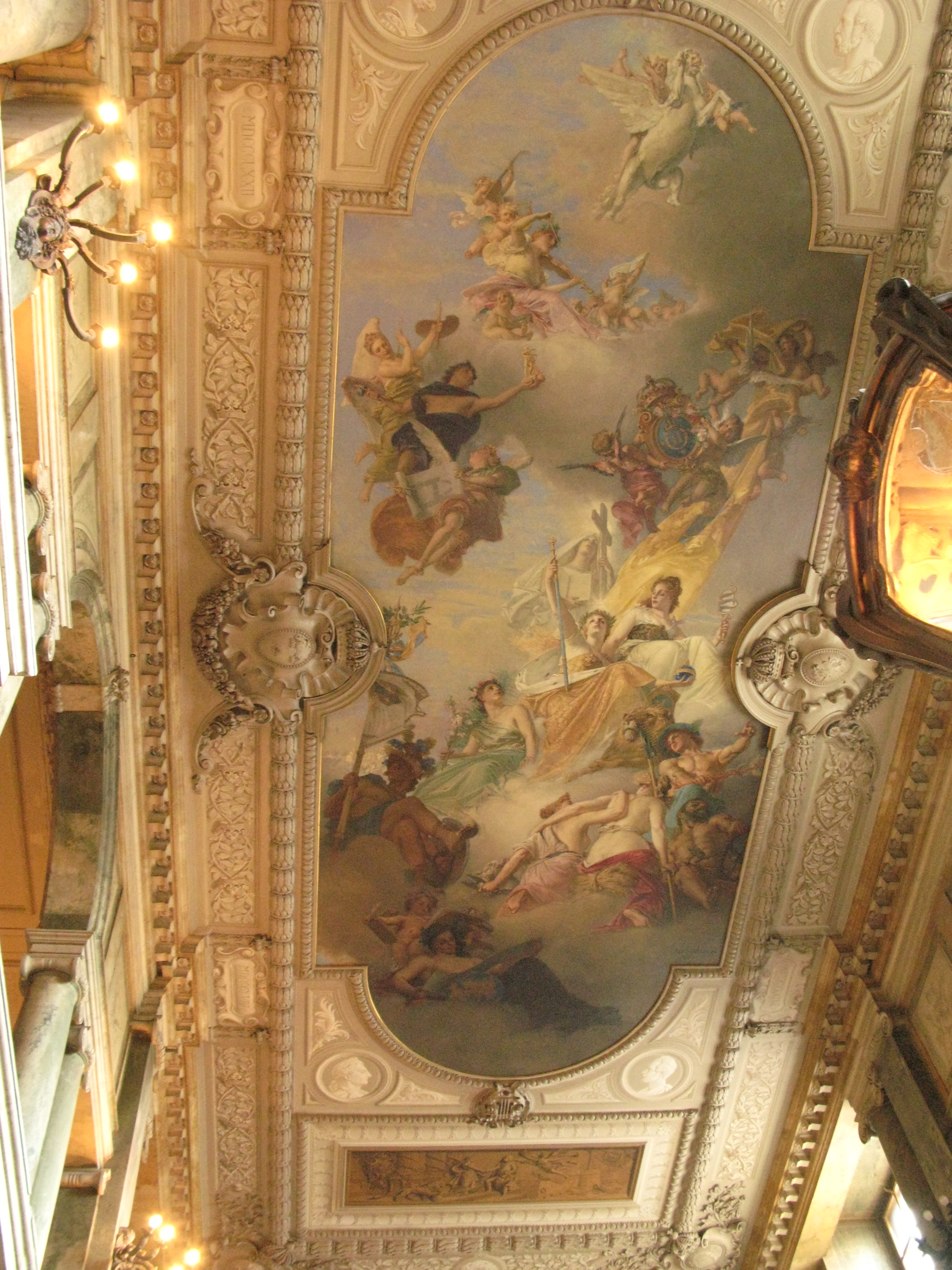
The ceiling in the west stairwell, a plafond by Julius Kronberg, 1890s

After the completion of the new palace, no major conversions has been made to the complex save for a number of adaptions, new interiors, modernizations and redecorations for different regents and their families. Museums have also been added to the palace.

Artists like Jean Eric Rehn and Fredrik Wilhelm Scholander were important to the palace's grand interior during the end of the 18th and 19th century, when pilasters, columns, wall decorations, etc. were added. Among those sculptors, painters and craftsmen who also contributed during the later renovations were Louis Masreliez (interior work in Classicism and Neoclassicism), Jean Baptiste Masreliez (interior work), Axel Magnus Fahlcrantz (the Logården Wall and the wrought iron fence at Logården), Johan Niclas Byström (sculptures), Sven Scholander (restorations), Johan Axel Wetterlund (façade sculptures of noted men and four allegorical groups on the Logården Wall), Julius Kronberg (ceiling paintings) and Kaspar Schröder (façade sculptures; lion masks at the courtyard façade).

A larger change in the façade was made during the reign of King Charles XIV John resulting in Hårleman's light yellow façade coloring being painted over and at the beginning of the 20th century during the reign of King Oscar II when a decision to go back to Tessin's original brick red color was made. As of 2014 it is the color of the façade. (see Coloration below)

During the reign of King Oscar I, there was a renewed interest for older styles and when the Vita Havet (the White Sea Ballroom) was created from the designs of Per Axel Nyström in 1844–1850, a compromise between old and new was made. Fredrik Wilhelm Scholander was the royal curator of King Charles XV and shared his taste in interior design, this resulted in rooms like the Victoriasalongen (the Victoria Drawing room) in a lush, revived Rococo style.

King Oscar II performed a number of additions, improvements and modernizations to the palace. Most of the empty façade niches were filled with sculptures during his reign. He had the palace's technical installations updated, such as installing a water pipe system in 1873, installing electricity in 1883, telephone in 1884 and waterborne central heating around 1900. As of 2014 the property is connected to long-distance heating. The king's interest also extended to the decoration of the stairwells, and he commissioned Julius Kronberg to paint plafonds in the ceiling of the West Stairwell. Author Georg Svensson, wrote about King Oscar II that "his goal was to complete the construction of the palace as intended in Tessin's plans in a manner worthy of this monument".

During 1922 to 1930, the Logården was rebuilt from the former English park to a more open area with pools of water on either side of the walkway leading from the East Arch to the Skeppsbron.

In 1956 to 1958, Gustav III's Museum of Antiquities was restored. Architect and Chief Intendant Ivar Tengbom was appointed for the work. The Treasury was opened in 1970 and the Tre Kronor Museum in 1999. In 2018 600 solar panels were installed on the roof of the palace and are expected to generate an annual output of 170 MWh or at least twelve percent of the palace's annual electricity consumption.

In 1998 the Carl XVI Gustaf Jubilee Room was inaugurated to celebrate the silver jubilee of Carl XVI Gustaf. The room is located on the Bernadotte Floor and was designed to be a modern inclusion to the old palace. Today the room is used as a representative room for the king and queen. When Carl XVI Gustaf later in 2023 celebrated his golden jubilee two new golden cyphers were gifted to the king by the Royal Court to be placed at the gate to Logården (the palace gardens).

== Exterior ==
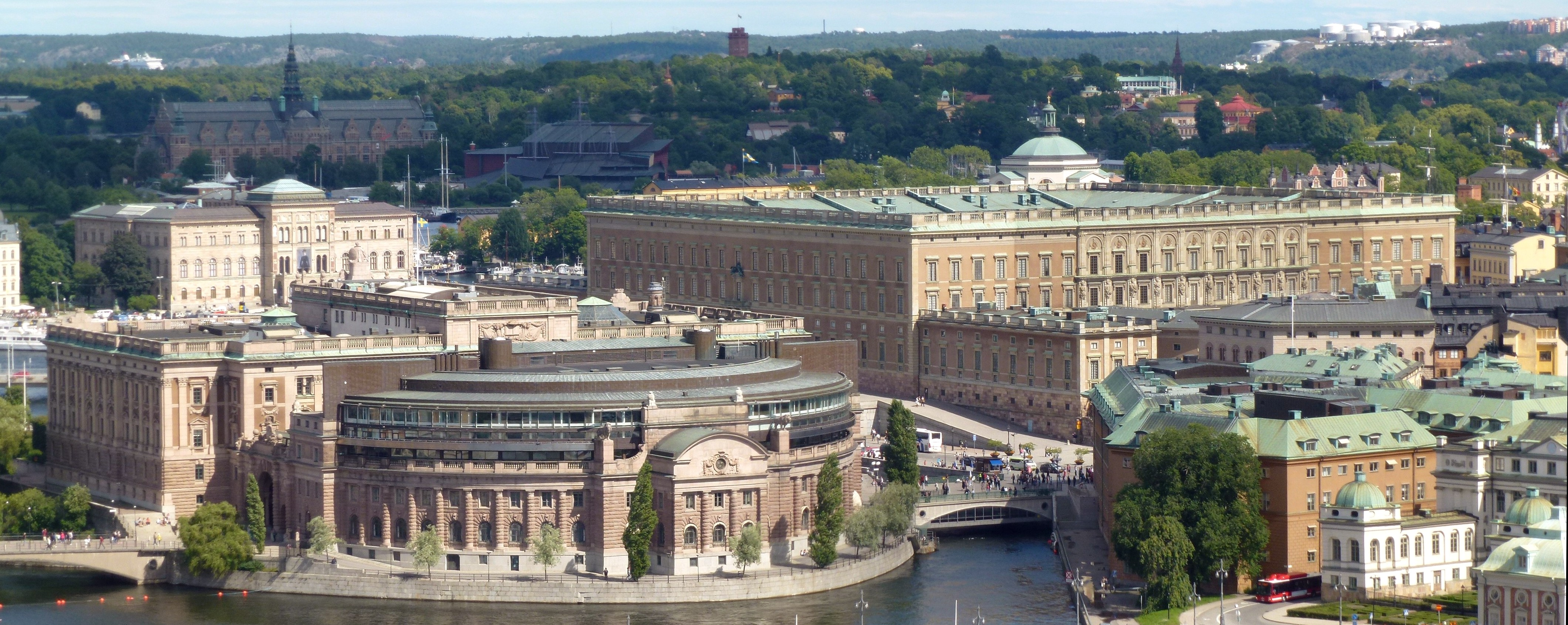
Stockholm Palace (to the right) and Parliament House (to the left). In the background the sunlit façade of the Nationalmuseum (at left) and the dome of the Skeppsholmen Church (upper right).

=== Overview ===
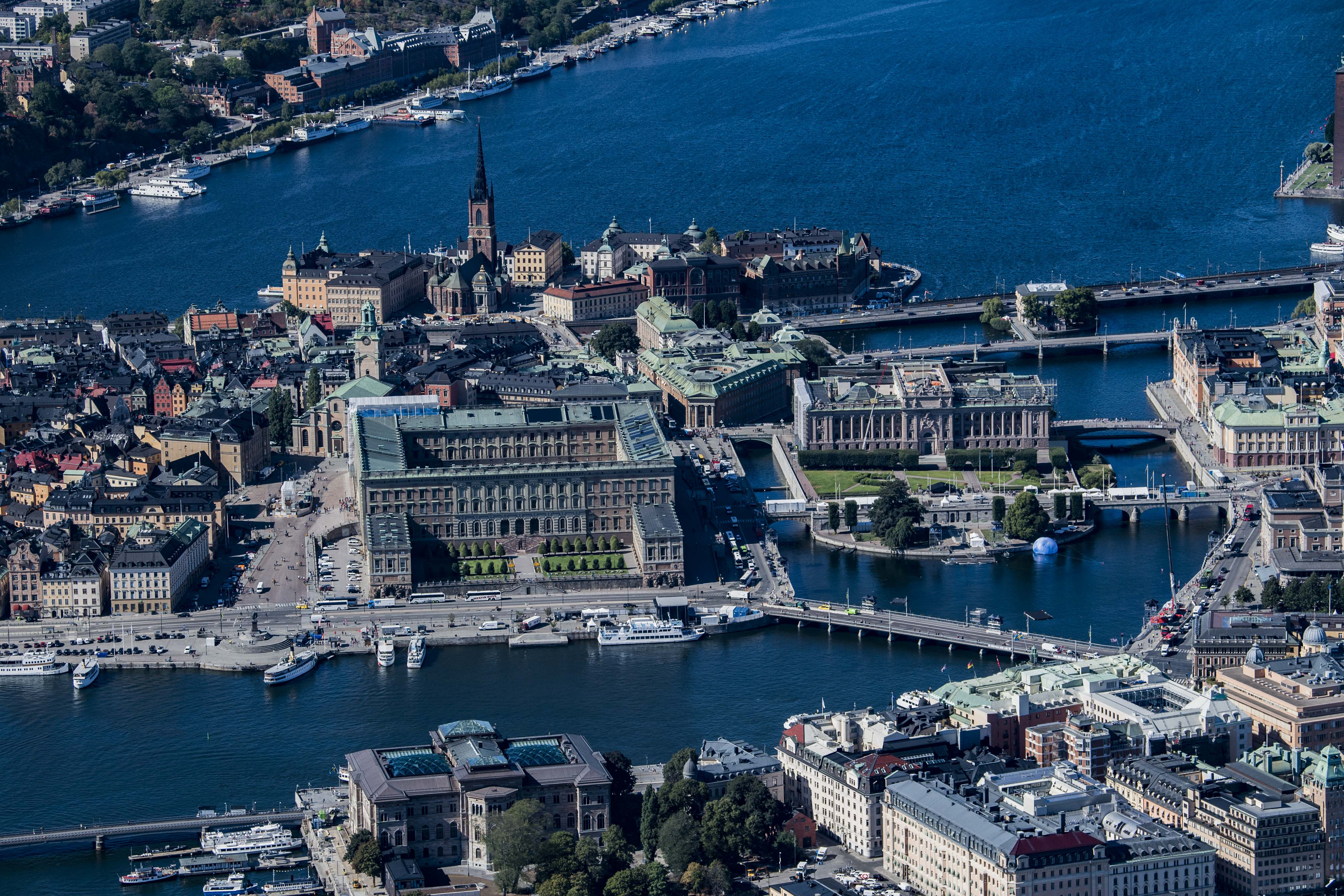
Aerial view of Stockholm Palace and central Stockholm

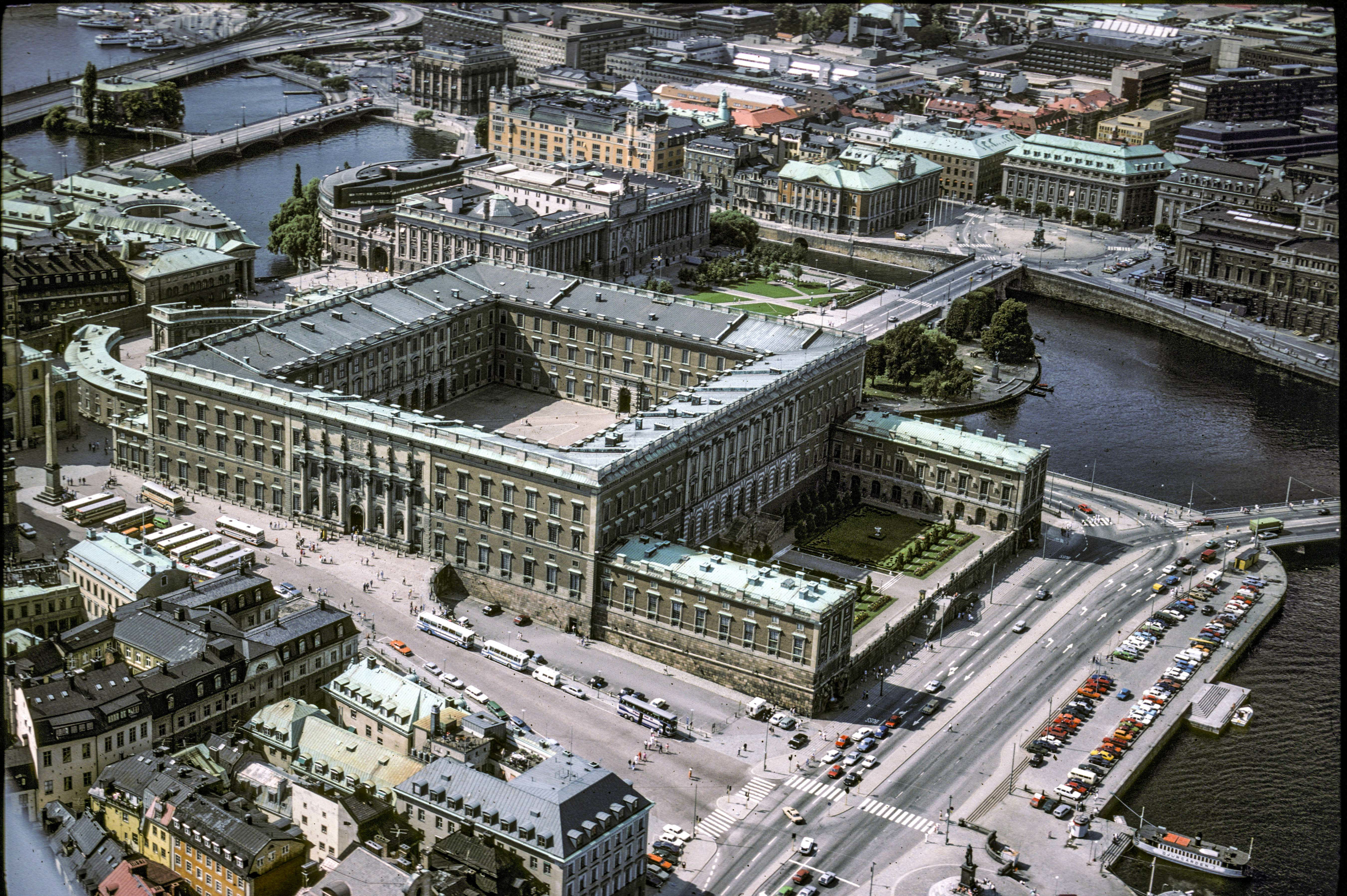
Stockholm Palace from the air

The palace is made of brick and sandstone. The roofs are covered with copper and are slanting inward towards the inner courtyard. On the main building they are encircled by a balustrade made of stone. The building consists of four rows, commonly named after the four cardinal directions.

The façades of the palace were each given their own design and not the same as the original northern row. A triumphal arch in splendid Baroque style framed the entrance and the stairwell in the middle of the southern façade, and niches for statues were placed at every second window ledge. The middle parts of the east and west façades were adorned with Baroque pilasters, herms and statues. The palace has a total of 28 statues, 717 balusters, 242 volutes, 972 windows, 31,600 window panes and approximately 7,500 windows, doors and gates. The façade is covered with circa 9,500 m^{2} (102,000 sq ft) of dimension stone and 11,000 m^{2} (120,000 sq ft) of plaster. The main building, without the wings, is 115 by 120 m (377 by 394 ft) and encloses the Inre borggården (the Inner Courtyard).

Projecting from the corners of the main building are four wings facing the east and the west. Between the two eastern wings is the Logården, and between the two western wings is the Outer Courtyard. All the wings are 16 m (52 ft) wide and 48 m (157 ft) long except for the southwest wing which is 11 m (36 ft) long because of the position of the Storkyrkan. The asymmetry is concealed by the two detached, semicircular wings the Högvaktsflygeln (The Royal Guards Wing) and the Kommendantsflygeln (the Commander's Wing).

Approximately 800,000 people visit the palace each year.

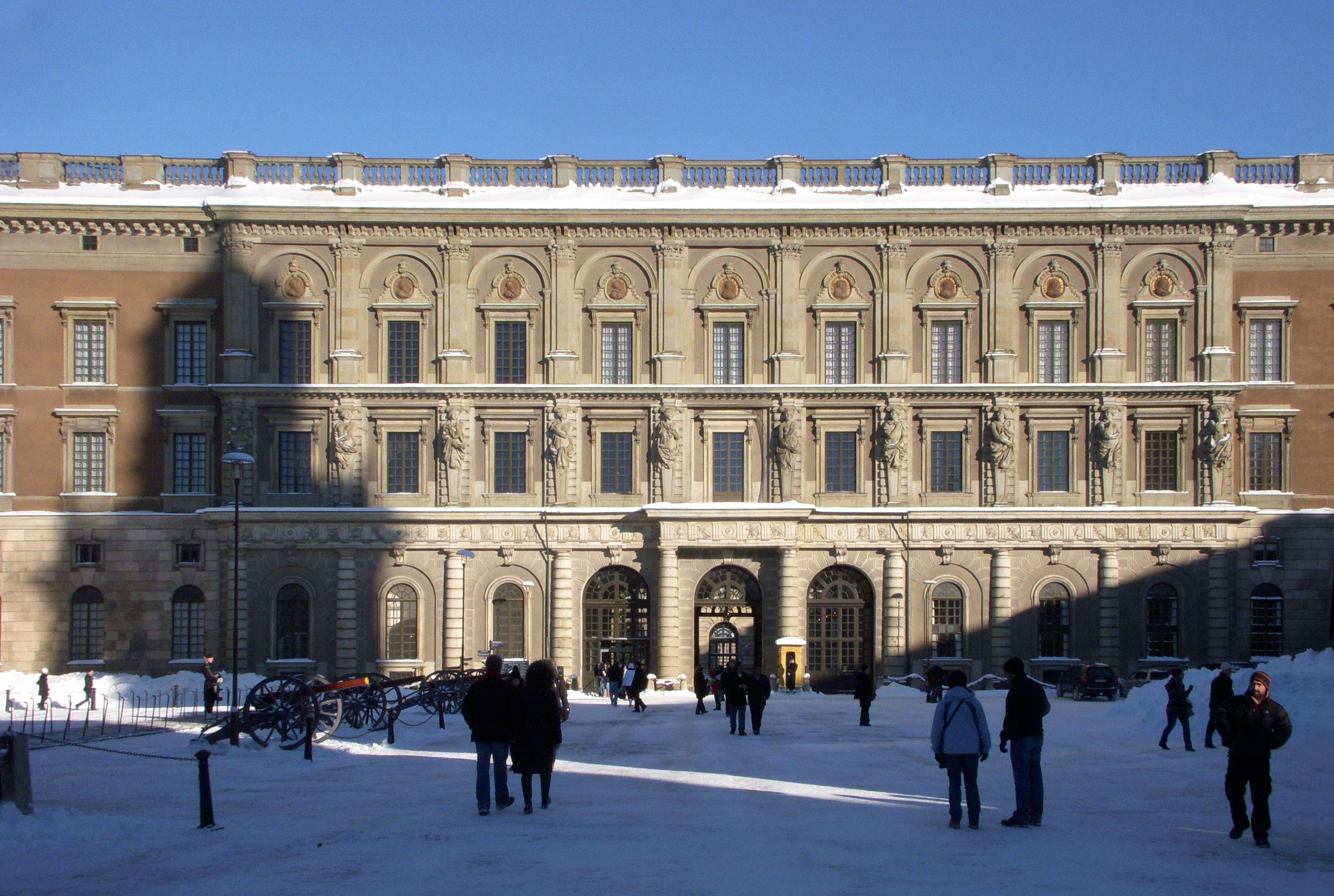
The western façade

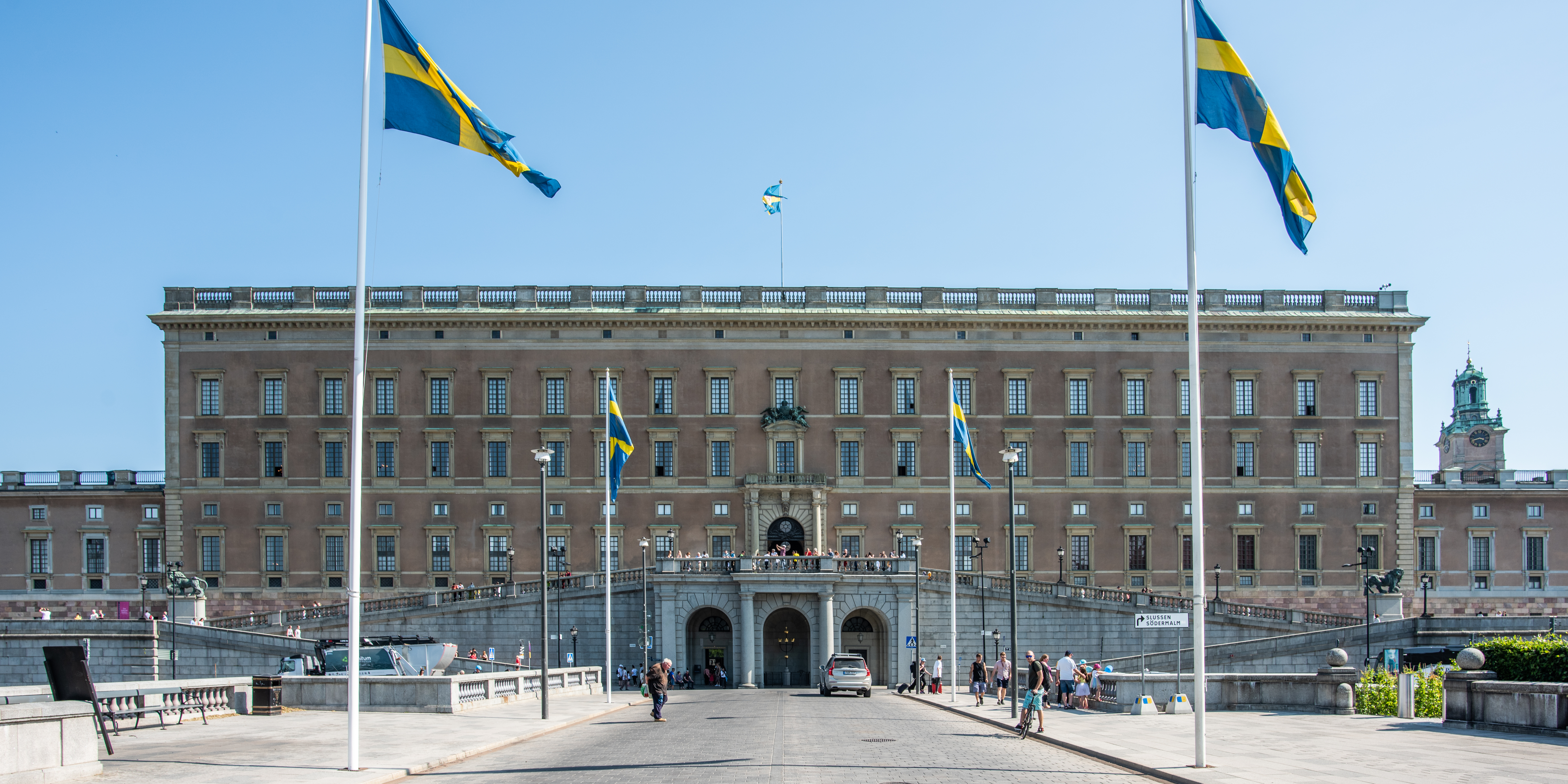
The northern façade

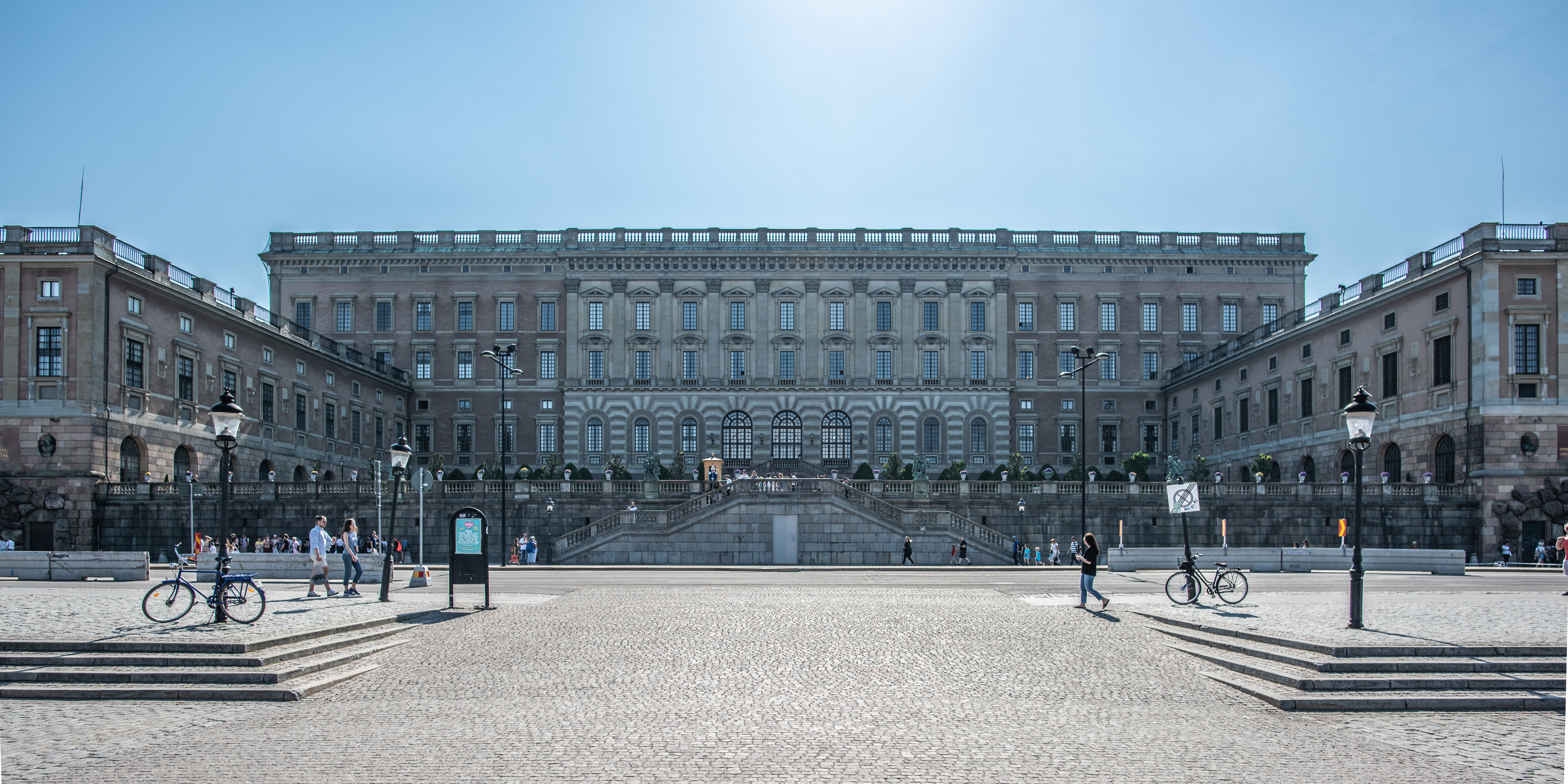
The eastern façade

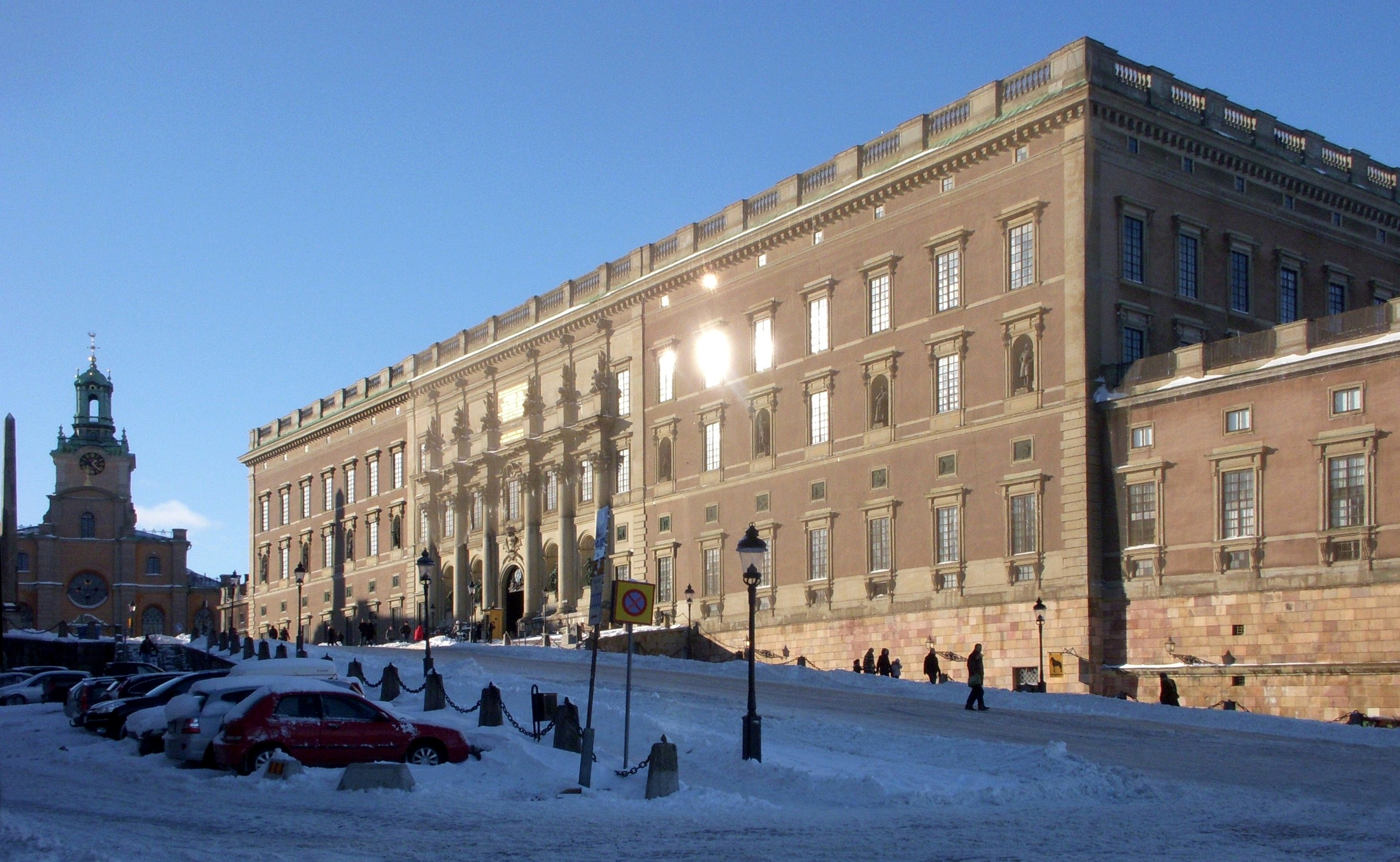
The southern façade

=== The courtyards ===
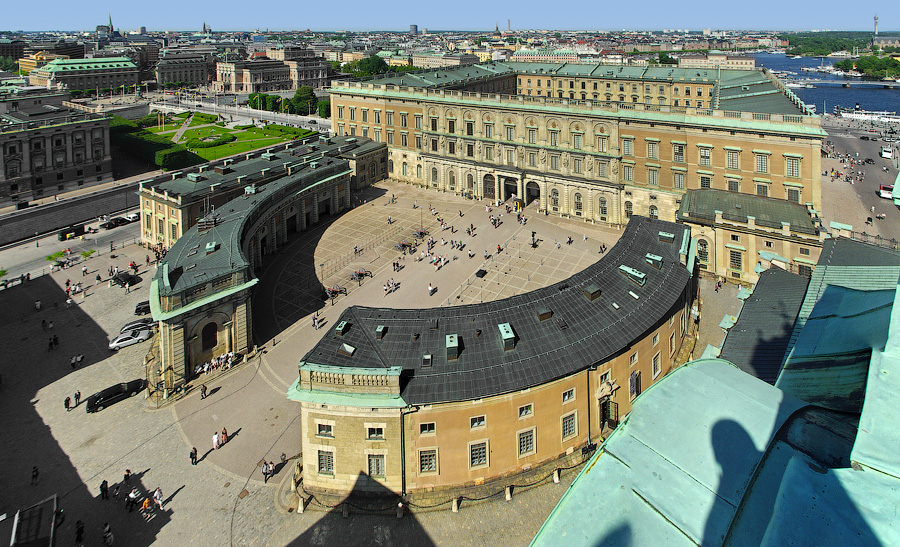
The outer courtyard and the western row seen from the tower of the Storkyrkan

The palace has two courtyards. Outside the western row is the Outer Courtyard which is the main area for the changing of the guards. A statue of Christina Gyllenstierna stands in the Outer Courtyard, erected at an initiative from the Föreningen för Stockholms fasta försvar (the Society for the Permanent Defence of Stockholm) in 1912. The Outer Courtyard is enclosed by two curved wings. The northern is used by the Royal Guards and the southern mainly by the Royal Gift Shop.

The Inner Courtyard is surrounded by the four rows of the palace and is accessed by portals in the middle of the four rows: the south, west, north, and east portals (or arches). The Inner Courtyard is 89 m (292 ft) long in the east–west direction and 77 m (253 ft) wide in the north–south direction. Tessin had planned to put an equestrian statue depicting Charles XI in the middle of the courtyard, but this plan was never realized.

The design of the large Inner Courtyard with its access to the Logården and the Norrbro is inspired by the courtyard at the Louvre according to the general ideas of the Baroque.

=== The western row ===
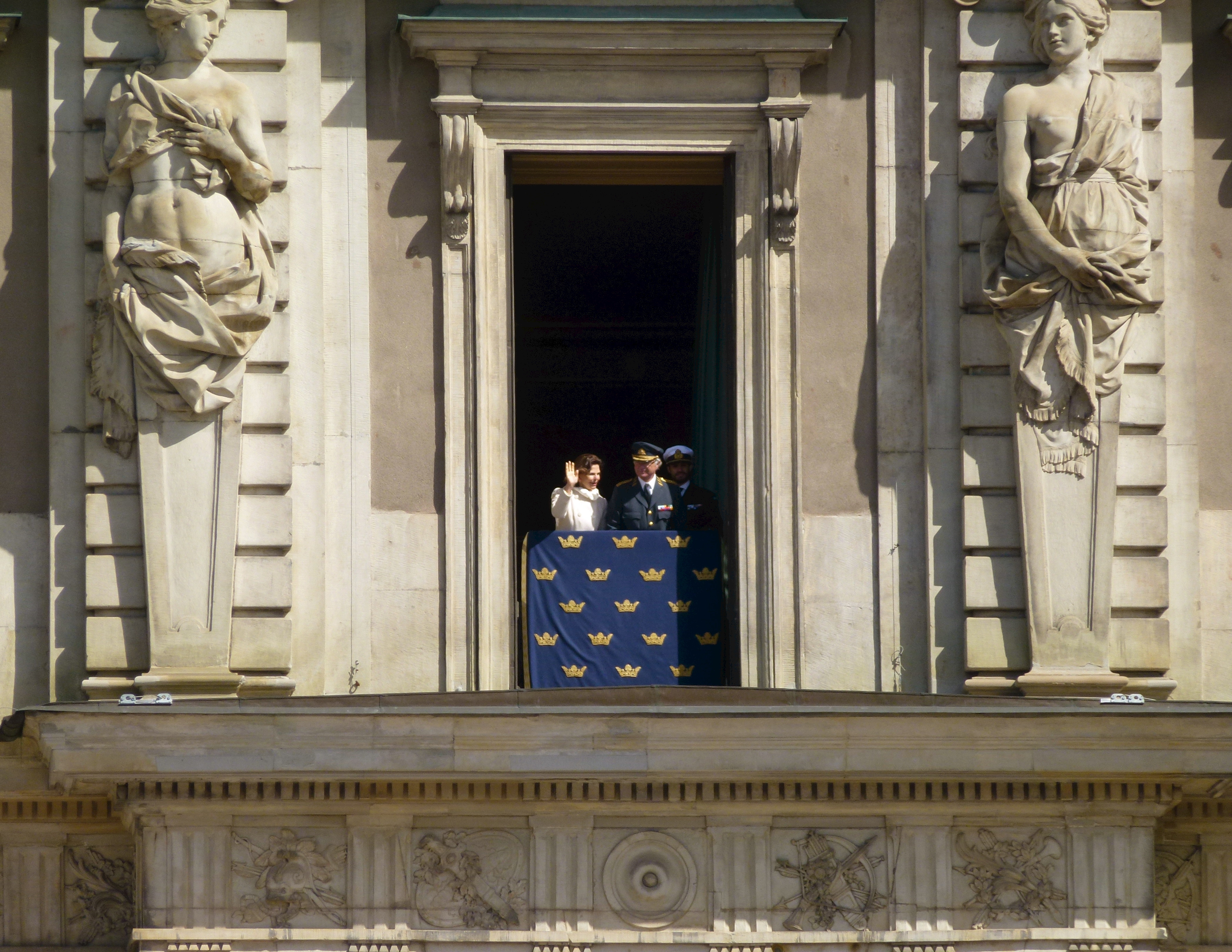
The King and the Queen at the window

The western row, or the western façade, represents "The Male Qualities" and the King. From the western row projects the Chancery Wing towards northwest. The row also abuts the Outer Courtyard and the two curved wings, Högvaktsflygeln in the north and the Kommendantsflygeln in the south. On the façade are nine medallions depicting nine Swedish regents and ten caryatids. The balcony above the courtyard, completed in 2023 using Tessins original plans, is usually where the Royal Family appears for the Kings Birthday

==== Sculptures ====
In the frontispiece of the western façade between the windows there are ten female characters called caryatids. The caryatids of the palace are Rococo inspired pilasters in the shape of women, made by the French artist Charles Guillaume Cousin of Gotlandic sandstone in 1744. Each figure is approx. 4.5 m (15 ft) high. Some of them have weathering damages and since there is a risk of small pieces falling from them, a net has been placed over the figures.

Kungamedaljongerna (the Royal Medallions) above the windows were made by Cousin. The medallions depict Gustav I, Eric XIV, John III, Sigismund III, Charles IX, Gustavus Adolphus, Queen Christina, Charles X Gustav, Charles XI. The medallions are approximately 1.5 m (4.9 ft) in diameter and were made of lead in 1745.

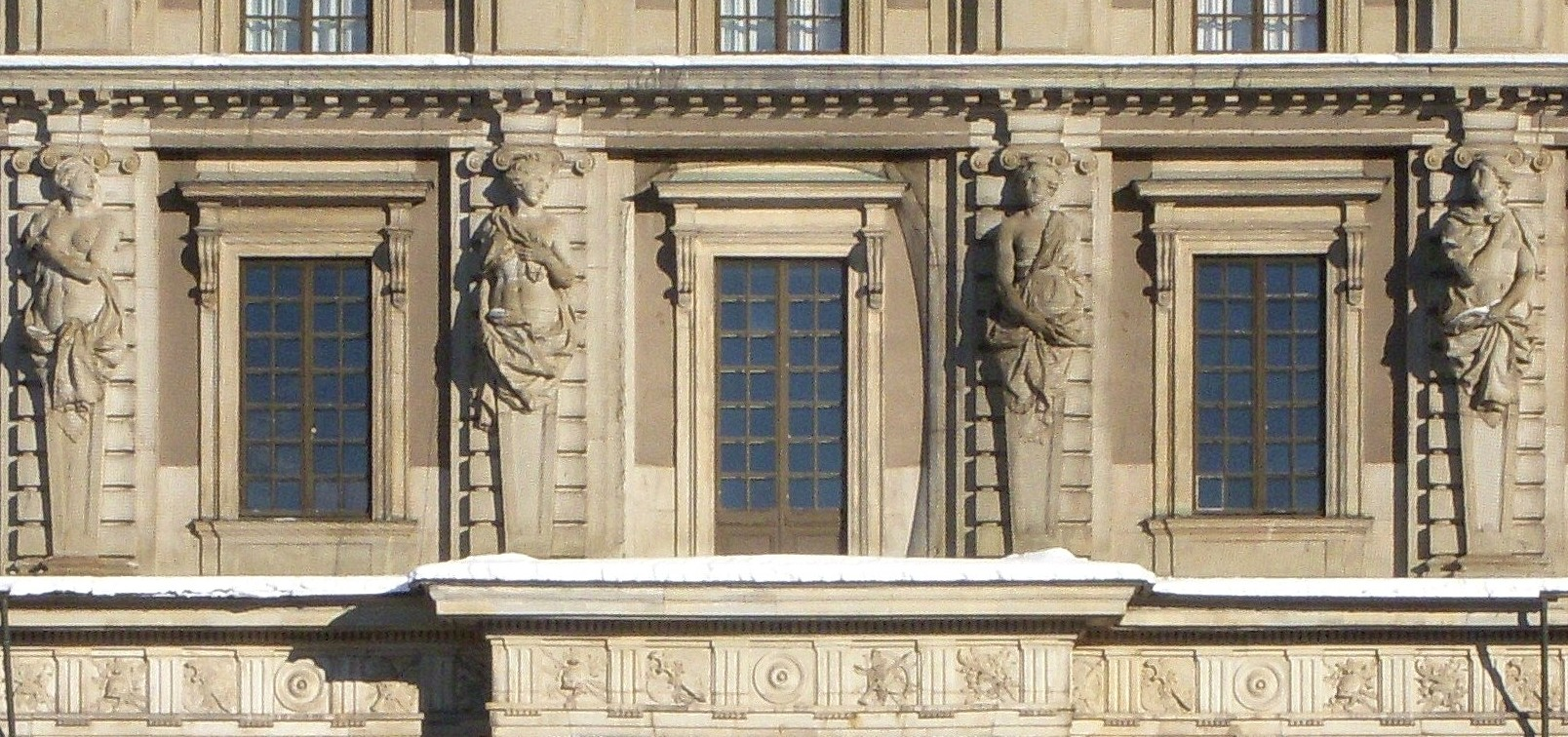
Four of ten caryatids

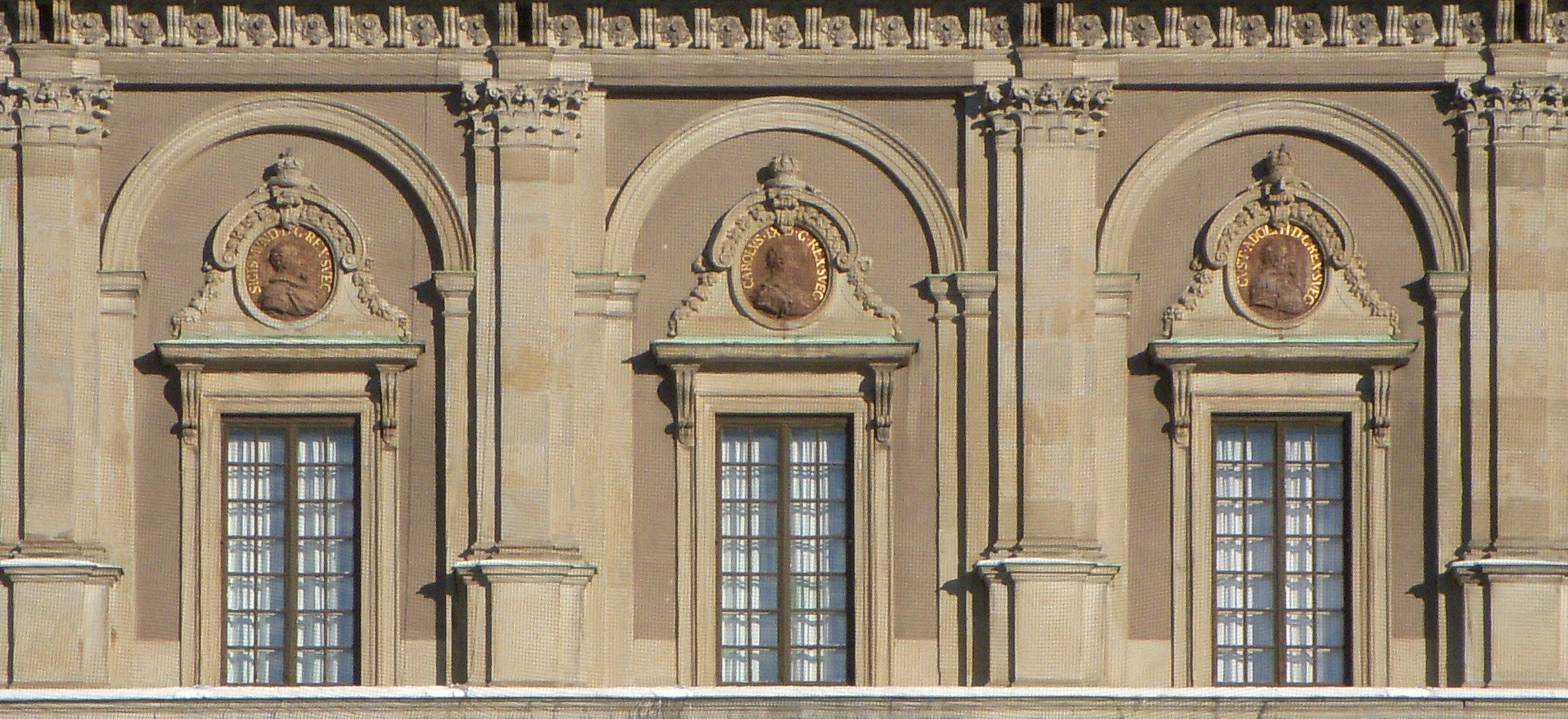
Three of nine royal medallions

=== The northern row ===
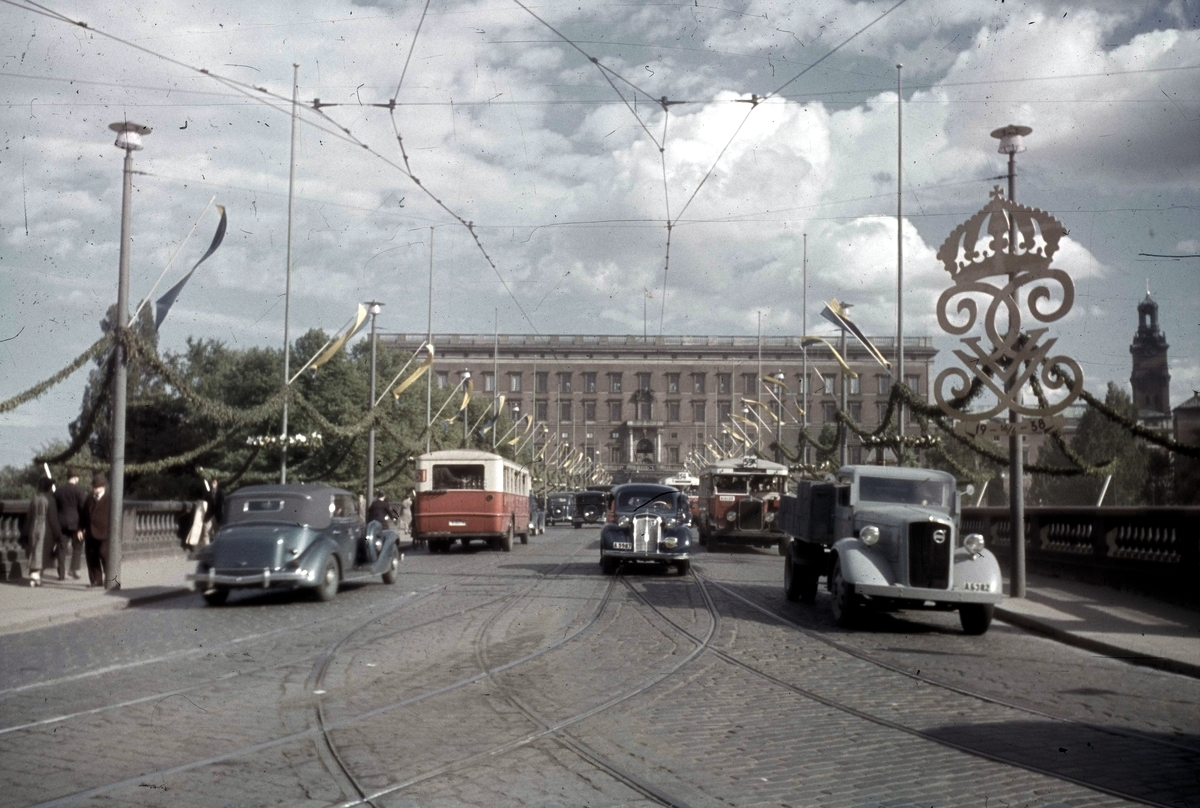
The northern façade of Stockholm Palace in 1938.

The northern row, or the north façade, represents "Power". This façade is austere and its location and the perspective that it faces north, is meant to mirror and radiate the royal power.

==== Sculptures ====
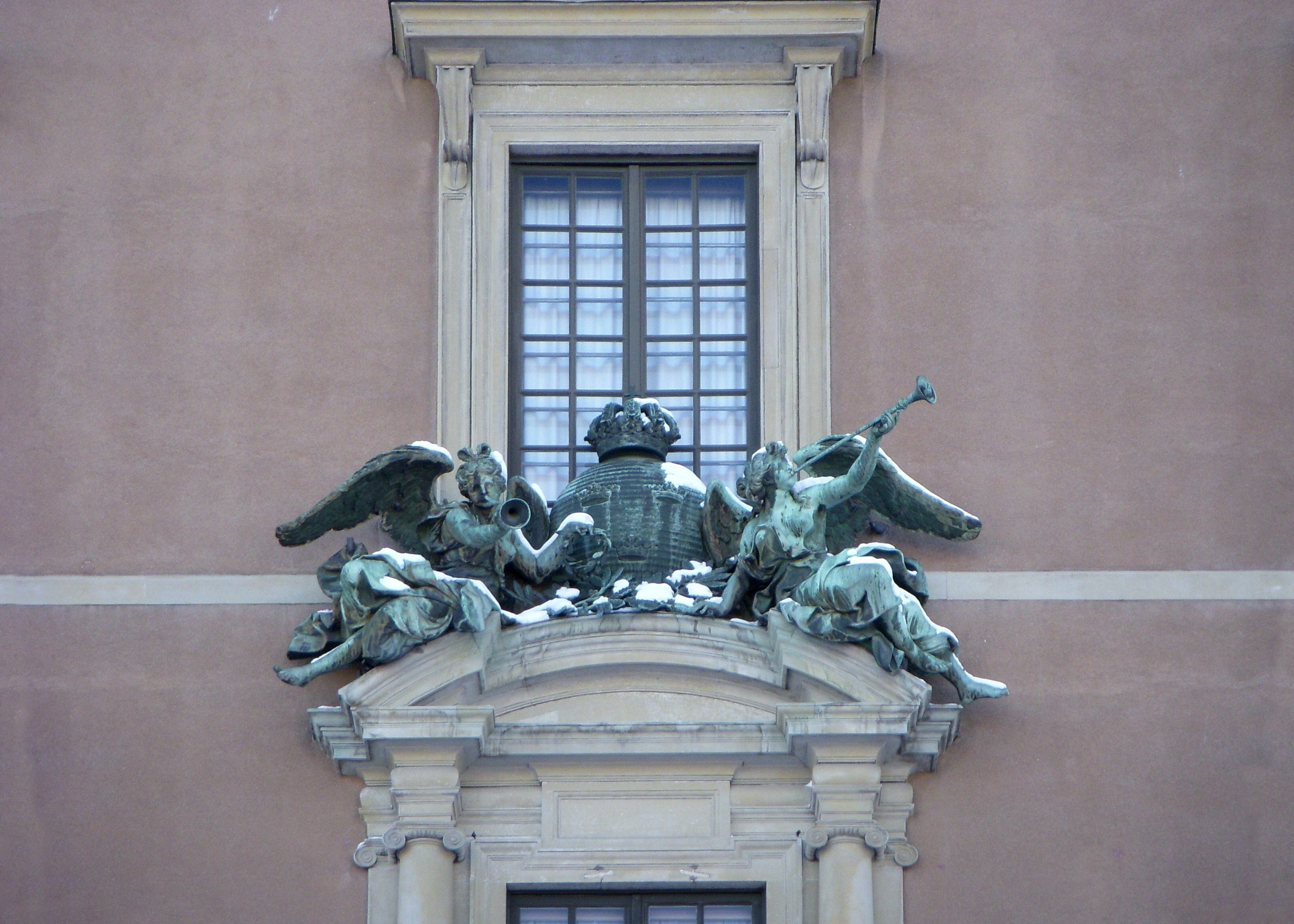
The Renomé group

The artistic adornment on the northern row is very sparse and consists only of a group of figures above the balcony of the Bernadotte Gallery. The group depicts the Swedish coat of arms the Tre Kronor (the Three Crowns) which is supported by two goddesses of rumor. The coat of arms itself and the wings of the goddesses are made by Claude Henrion while the rest of the group is made by Bernard Foucquet the Elder. It was cast in bronze and was not added to the façade until 1814.

Outside the northern façade is the Lejonbacken with the two Castle Lions, Slottslejonen. The models for the lions, inspired by the Medici lions in Villa Medici in Rome, were approved by King Charles XII in 1700, after which the lions were cast in bronze at the Casting House in Normalm in 1702 and 1704. They were then placed at the Lejonbacken as a royal power symbol. The bronze for the lions was from a well, taken as booty from the Kronborg Castle in Helsingør, during King Charles X Gustav's campaign in Denmark. The plinths are made from granite and are 1.9-by-2.7-by-1.2-metre (6 ft 3 in by 8 ft 10 in by 3 ft 11 in).

=== The southern row ===
The southern row, or the southern façade, represents "The Nation". The center of the façade is made in the shape of a triumphal arch with a portal (also known as the South Arch) flanked by three columns made in corinthian order on each side.

Along the façade there are a number of niches with sculptures depicting noted Swedish men. The whole façade is supposed to reflect the grandeur of Sweden, its society and prominent persons in the country. Inside the portal is the South Arch with stairs leading to the Royal Chapel in the east, and the Hall of State in the west. This symbolizes the gathering of both the worldly and the divine power in one place.

At the triumphal arch there is a stone plaque with writing in Latin. The plaque is flanked by two sculptures depicting war trophies. They were created in 1735, by Antoine Bellette and cast by Gerhard Meyer the Younger. The inscription on the plaque honoring King Charles XII says:

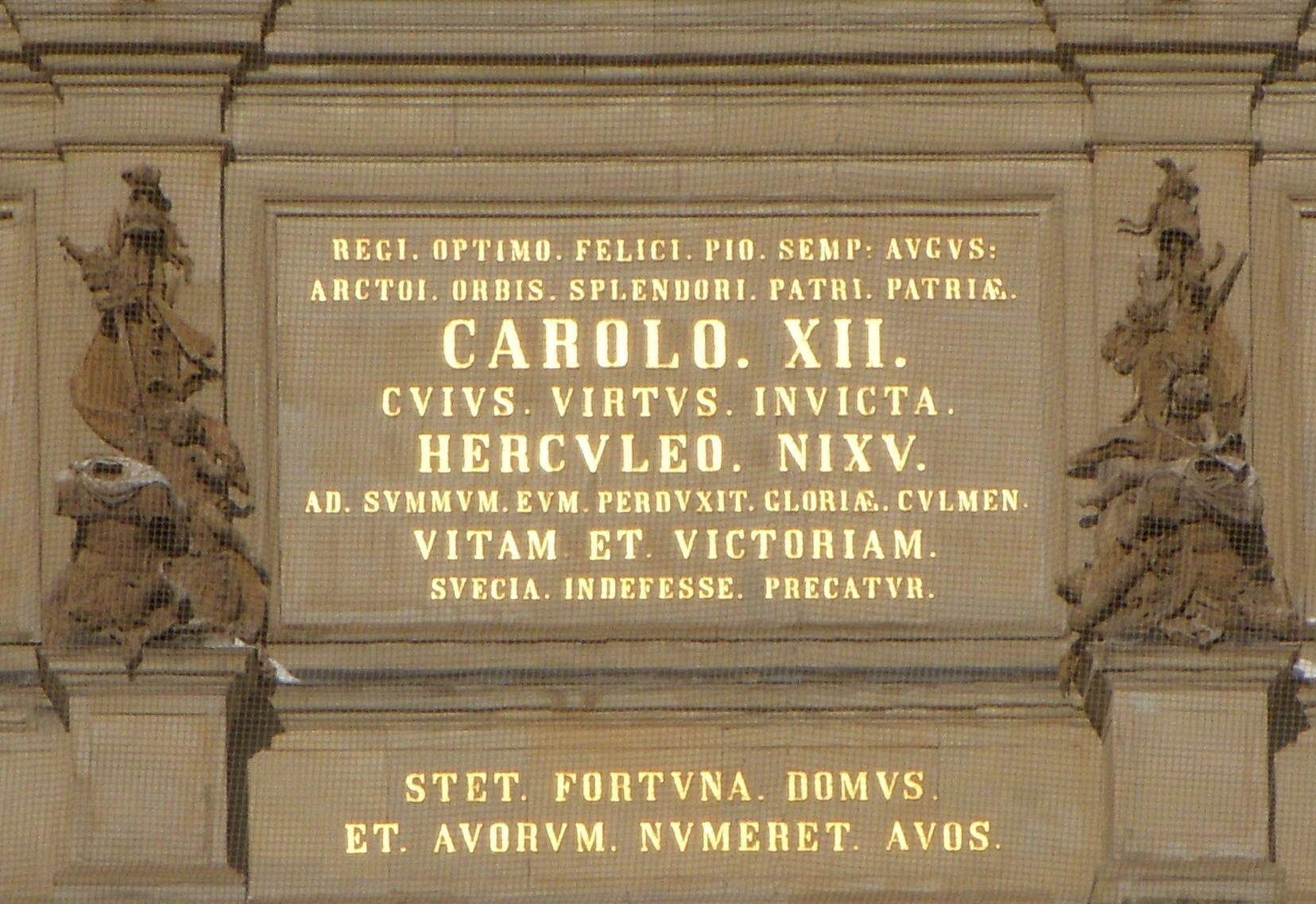
"Sweden prays tirelessly for life and victory for the King, the splendid, fortunate, pious and always venerable Charles XII, the pride of the northern world, Father of the fatherland, whose invincible bravery under Herculean effort brought him to the heights of glory. May the fortune of the House remain and add generation to generation."

==== Sculptures ====
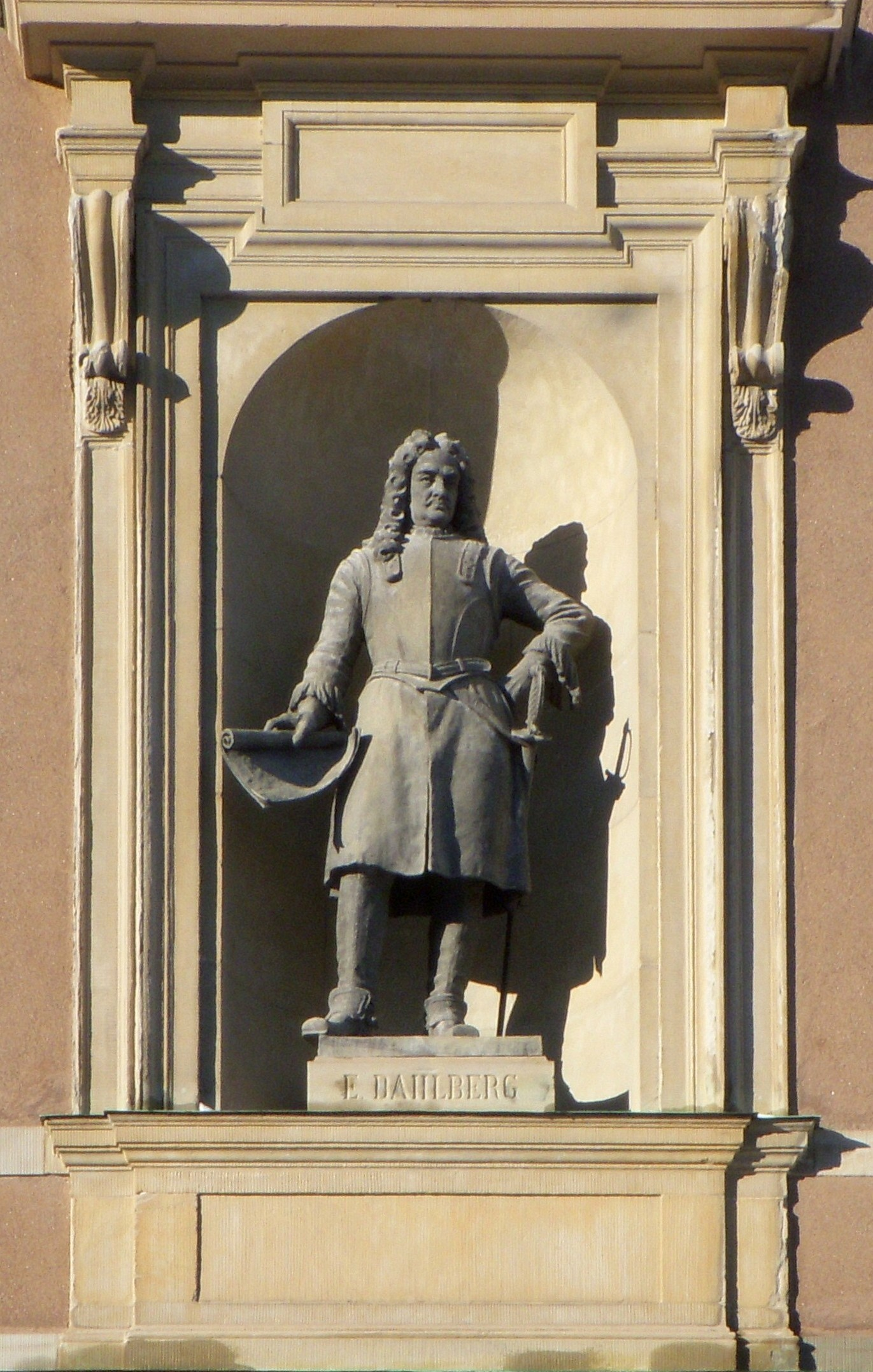
Erik Dahlbergh

The southern façade is the most ornate, with statues, sculptures, and reliefs. In eight, initially empty, niches are statues of notable Swedish men. These were added in the 1890s through the initiative of King Oscar II. The statues are approximately 2.8 metres (9.2 ft) tall, made of zinc by Johan Axel Wetterlund. The statues are depicting Erik Dahlbergh, Carl Linnaeus, Nicodemus Tessin the Younger and Georg Stiernhielm to the left of the South Arch, and Haquin Spegel, Olof von Dalin, Rutger von Ascheberg and Carl Fredrik Adelcrantz to the right of the South Arch.

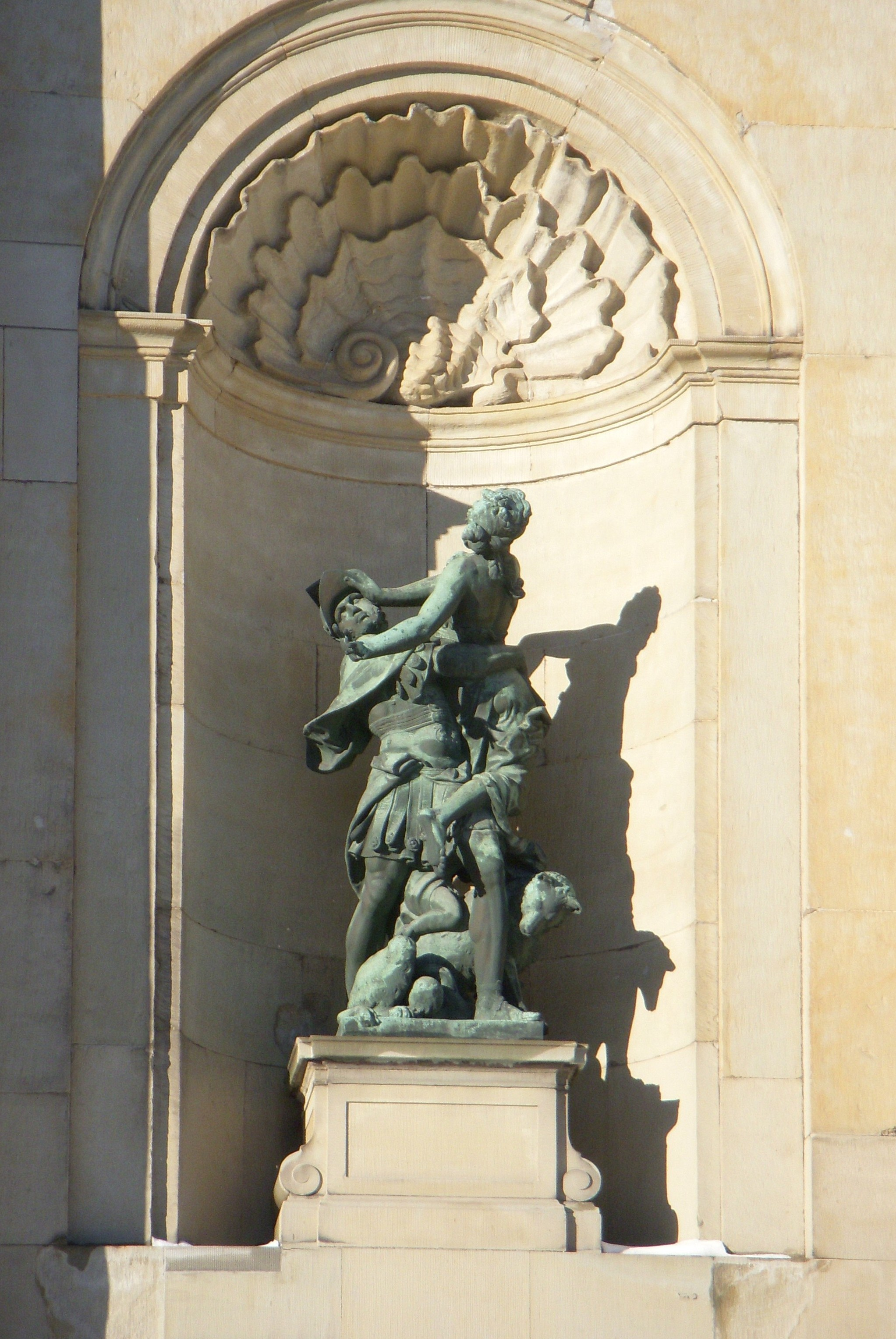
Romulus and Hersilia

Enleveringsgruppen (The Abduction Group), consisting of four sculptures (two to the right and two to the left side of the South Arch), illustrates the abductions of women and are made by Bernard Foucquet the Elder at the beginning of the 18th century, but the sculptures were not installed until 1897. From west to the east the sculptures depict: Paris and Helen, Boreas and Orithyia, Pluto and Proserpina, Romulus and Hersilia. They are made of bronze and are approx. 2.5 m (8.2 ft) high. The group were made at the initiative of King Oscar II to fill the previously empty niches in the triumphal arch. The originals have been restored by Sven Scholander and were cast by Otto Meyer. Bernard Foucquet also made the lions at the Lejonbacken.

==== Reliefs ====
Over the windows of the ground floor are 16 reliefs made in 1699 to 1700, by the French artist René Chauveau. They are made of bronze, and were originally to be placed in the palace's stairwells. In the 1890s, the reliefs were mounted on the southern façade, where they replaced a row of windows of the same size. The corresponding windows still exist on the northern façade.

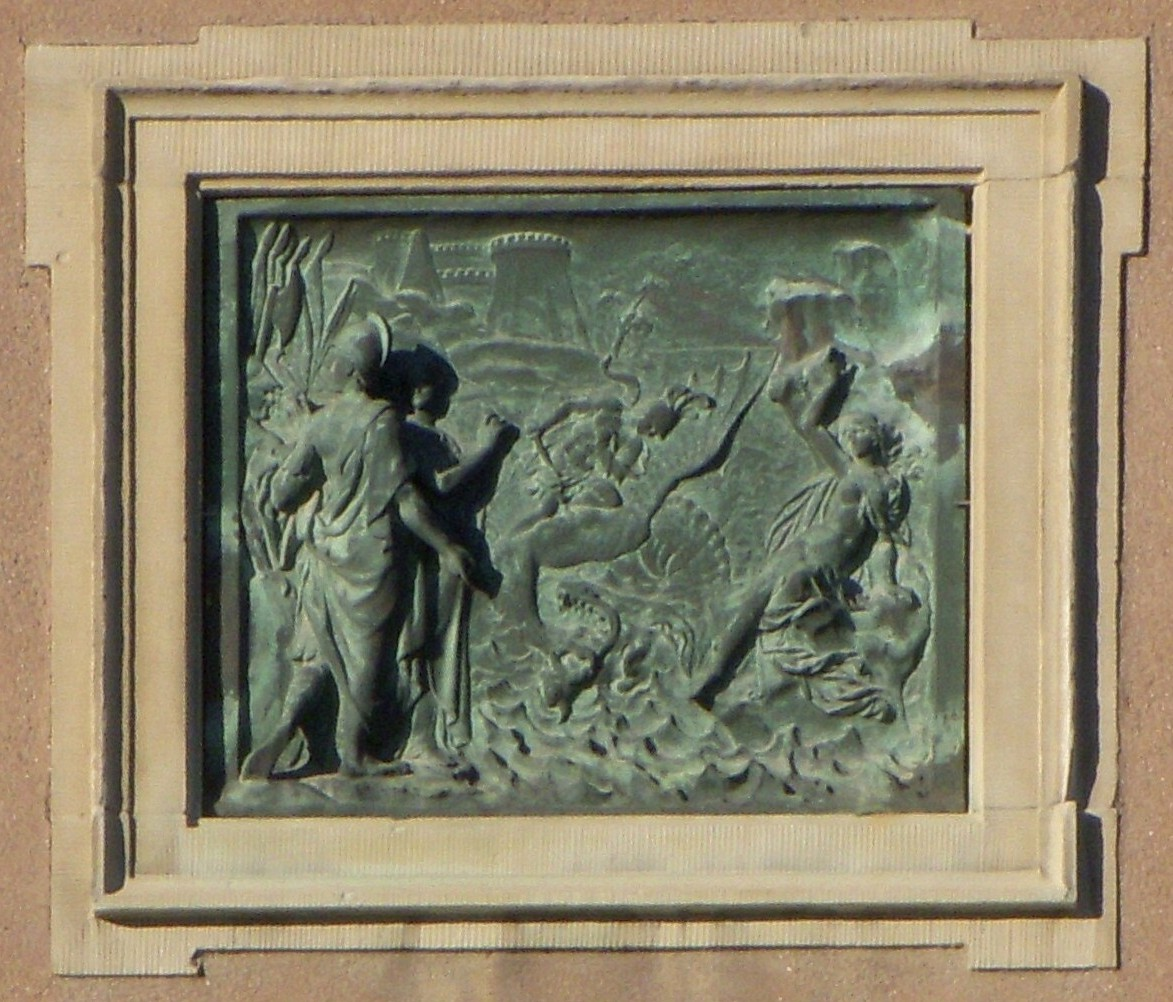
Perseus and Andromeda

The reliefs depict motifs from Ovid's Metamorphoses. Among the motifs are: the "Flood myth with Deucalion", the "Pyrrha and Hellen", the "Perseus and Medusa" and the "Apollo slaying the dragon Python".

=== The eastern row ===
The eastern row, or the eastern façade, represents "The Female Qualities" and the Queen. Below this façade is the palace park, the Logården. On a balustrade closing of the Logården from the Skeppsbron are four sculptures representing music, religion, poetry, and mercy. These can be seen as old perceptions of female values and interests.

When designing the eastern façade facing the Logården, Tessin is believed to have thought of a Roman country villa, with stairs from the palace garden up to the palace gate. The model for the central part, with colossal pilasters between the windows of the two top floor and the rustic ground floor, are presumed to be Gian Lorenzo Bernini's Palazzo Chigi-Odescalchi in Rome.

==== Sculptures ====
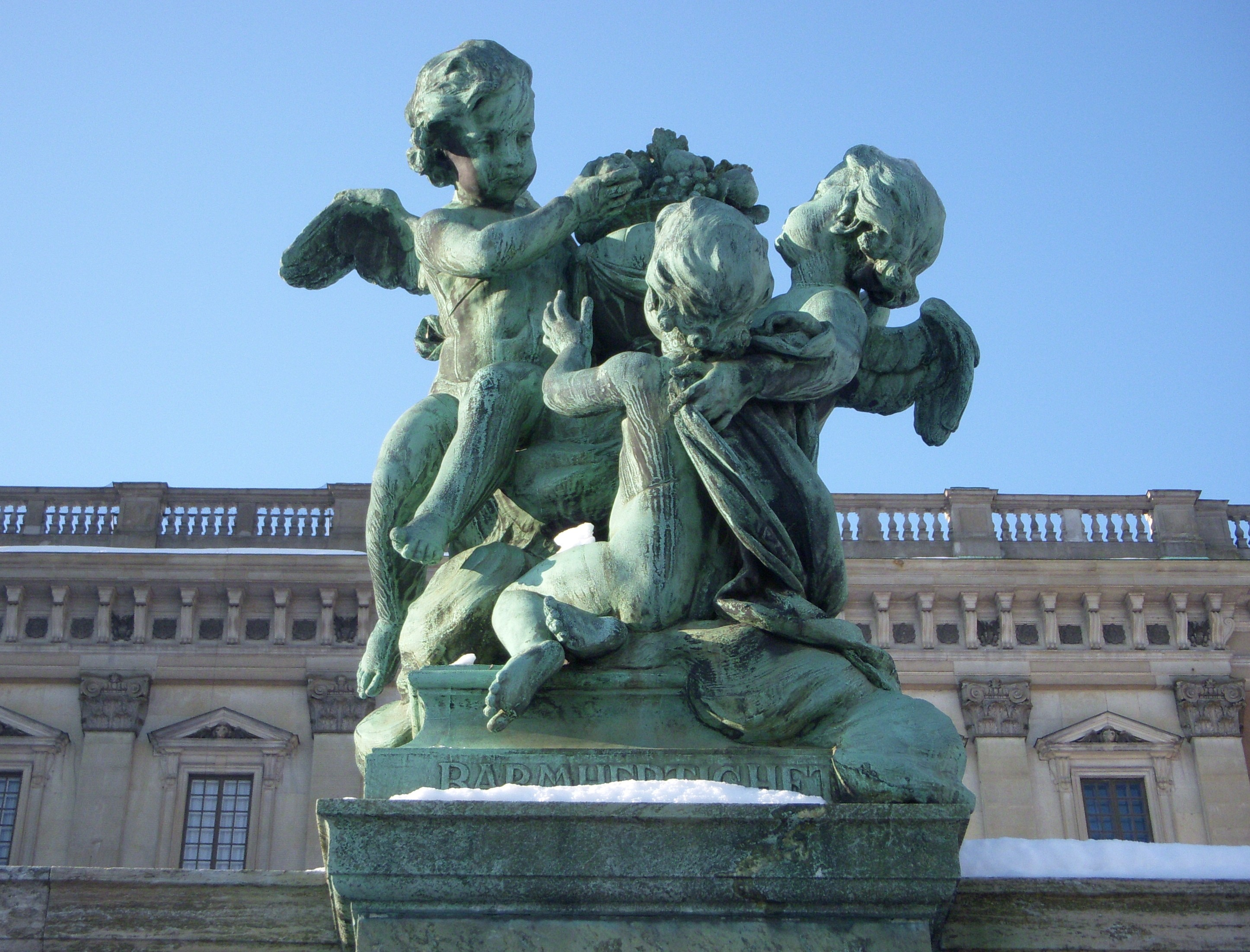
"Mercy"

Antoine Bellette made the dragons in the eastern façade, the winged lions on the Logården façade with windows, the shells on the middle floor and the roses under the roof.

On the balustrade between the Logården and the Logårdstrappan, are four allegorical sculptures representing "Music", "Religion", "Poetry" and "Mercy". They were made in 1903 by Johan Axel Wetterlund and cast by Otto Meyer and are approx. 1.5 by 1 m (4 ft 11 in by 3 ft 3 in).

From the eastern façade, two wing projects towards the east. On the short sides of these are two waterfalls and head sculptures of the artists who created the interior of the palace; Pierre Hubert L'Archevêque and Carl Hårleman on the north side, Carl Gustaf Tessin and Guillaume Thomas Taraval on the south side. These sculptures were made by Johan Axel Wetterlund in 1902, and are made of bronze. Between the sculptures there are two plaques honoring King Oscar II on the south side and Charles XI on the north side.

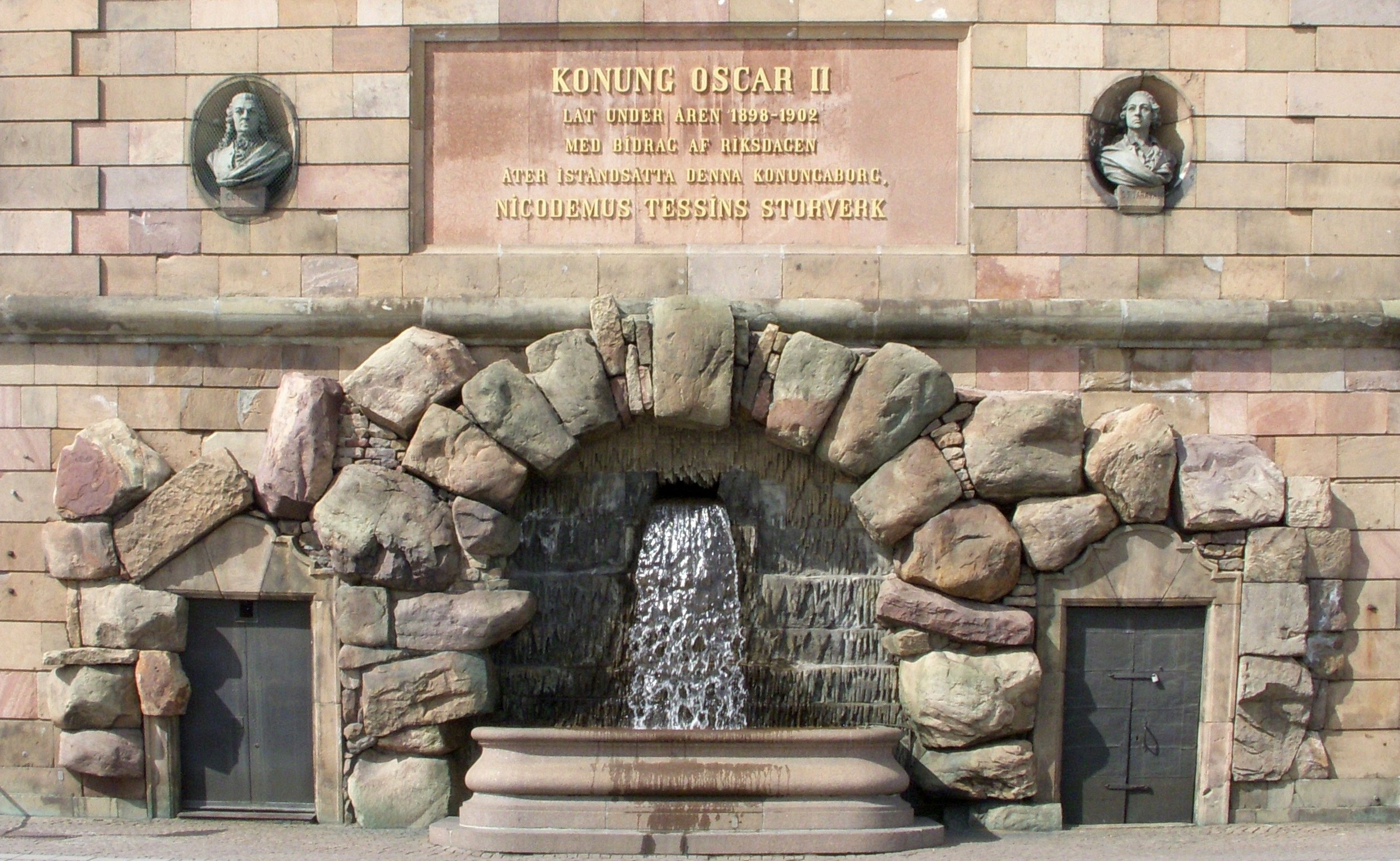
King Oscar II
had during the years 1898–1902
with contributions from the Riksdag
this kings' fortress restored
Nicodemus Tessin's masterpiece

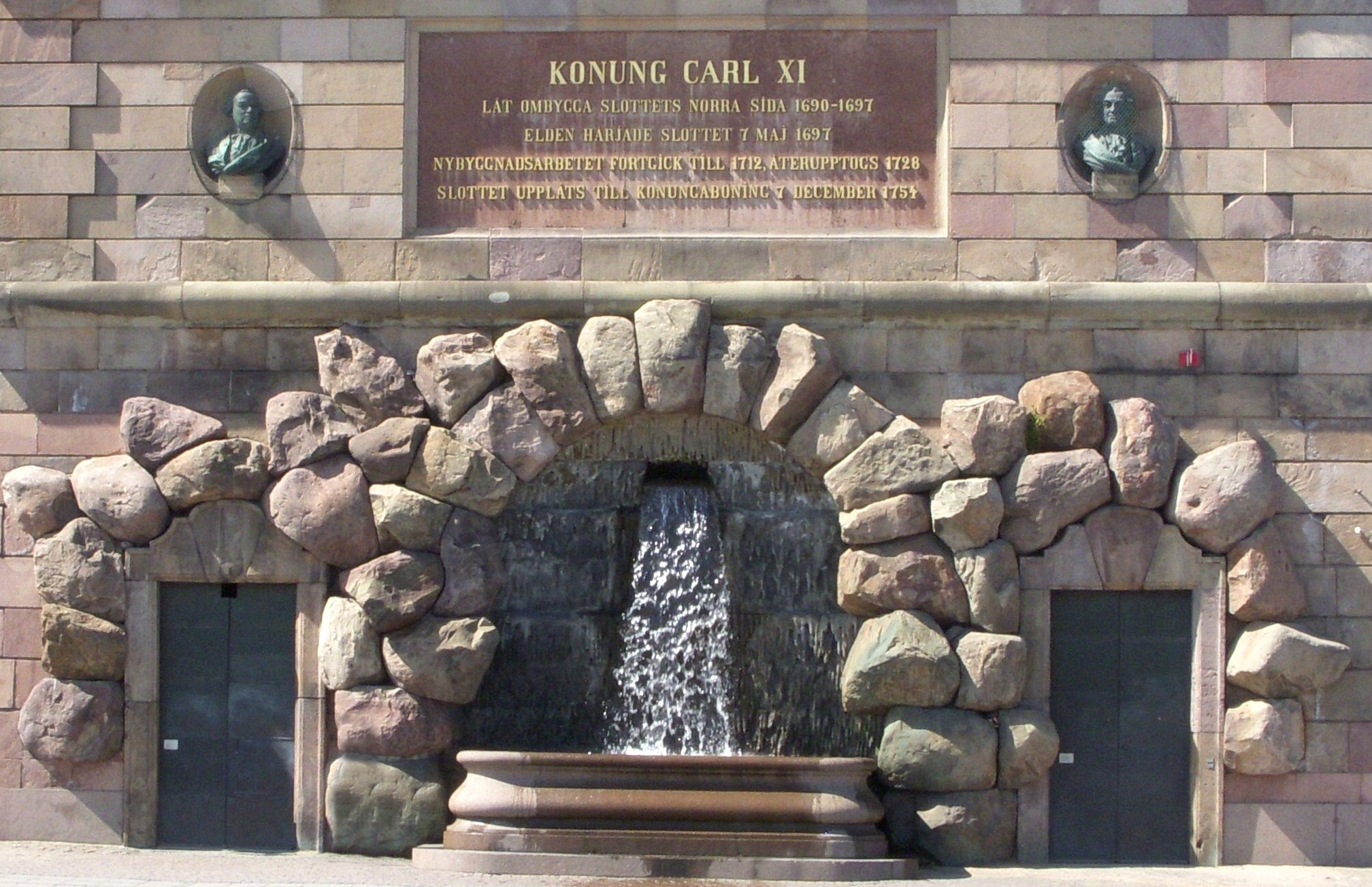
King Charles XI
had the northern side of the castle rebuilt in 1690–1697
fire ravaged the castle on 7 May 1697
the rebuilding proceeded until 1712, resumed in 1726
the castle was made available as the King's dwelling on 7 December 1754

=== Coloration ===
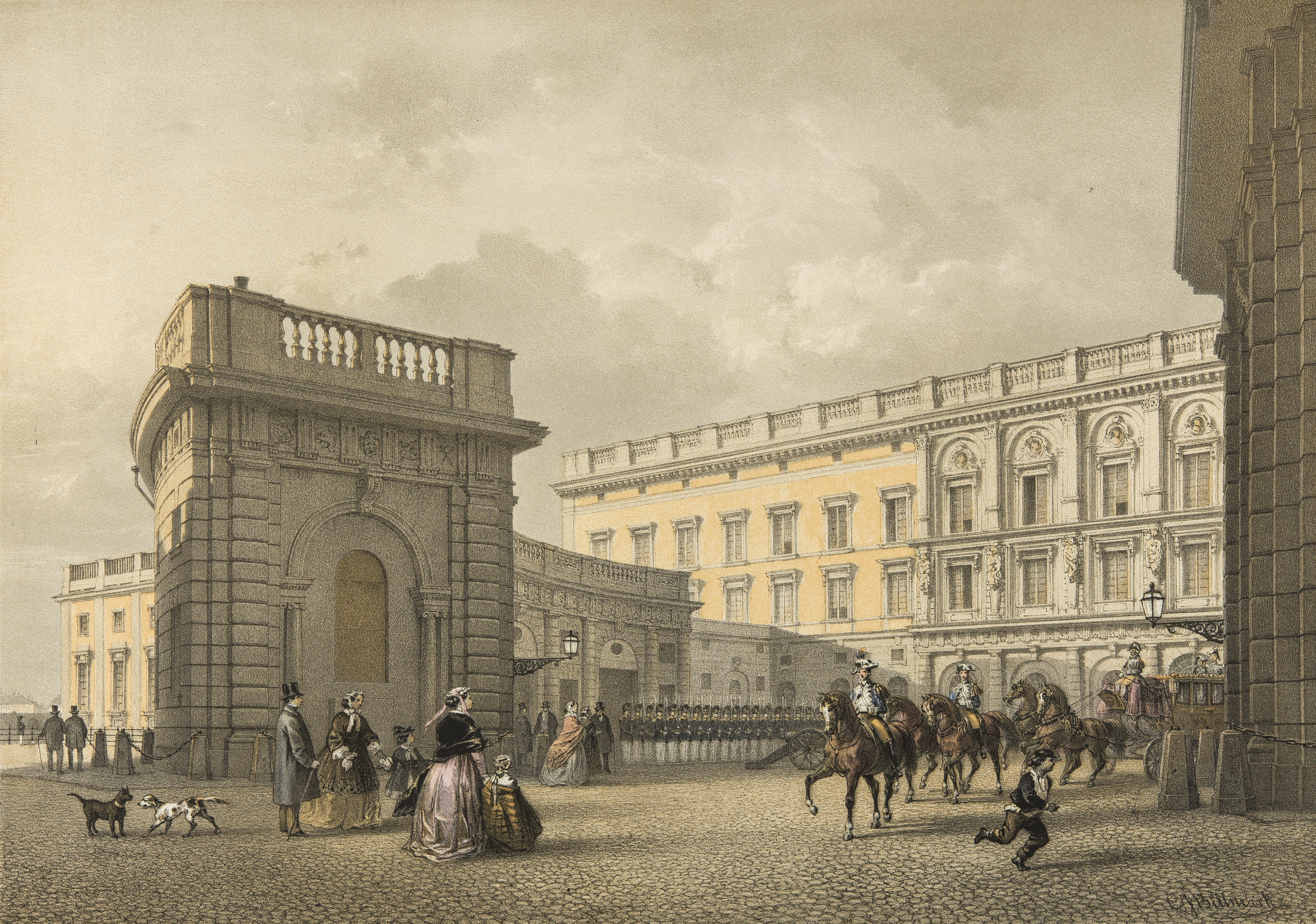
The coloration of the palace's façade in the 1800s

The coloration of the façade has been altered several times since the completion of the new northern row in 1695. Tessin's first coloration was brick-red plaster with white-painted sandstone details. The brick-red color was called Dutch brunroot (brown-red), and came from brown ochre that was bought for painting the walls of the building. Carl Hårleman took over as the head of the building site when Tessin died in 1728. During the construction, the plaster was left unpainted, while the stone details were painted in white lead.

Before the royal family moved in at the palace in 1754, the whole façade, except for the base which was painted in a yellow ochre color to imitate French sandstone. The yellow tone was the foremost color of the Rococo and the height of fashion at that time. The monochrome yellow color without any contrasting white on the stone details was a way to achieve an architectonical effect with mainly relief.

During the reign of King Charles XIV John in the 1820s, the coloration was changed again, but not fully. The stone details of the northern and eastern rows were painted in a pink color that was not widely appreciated. When the western and southern rows were to be painted, the stone details were done in a grey color which better contrasted to the still yellow plaster. This coloration lasted until the 1890s, when Tessin's red color was once again used on the plaster at the initiative of King Oscar II. All paint was removed from the sandstone details and sculptures. As of 2014, this coloration remains but the red-brown color has become more brown over the years. The removal of the protective paint has contributed to weathering.

=== Lighting ===
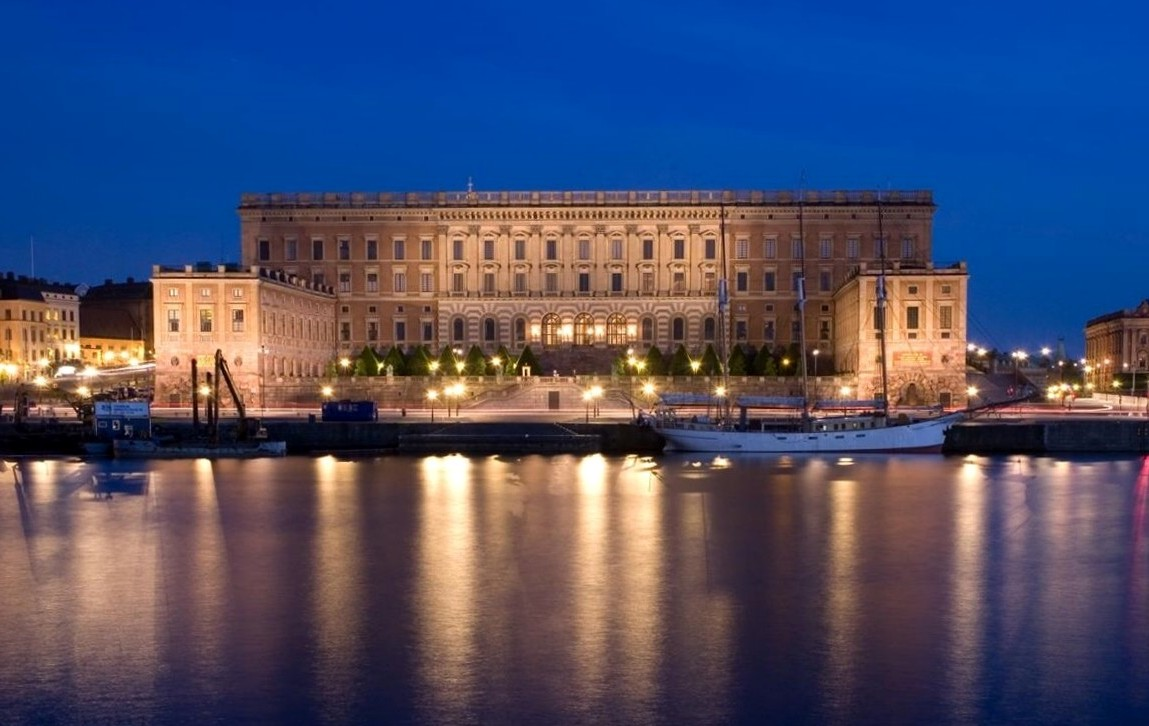
Lighting on the eastern façade in 2007

The present lighting of the palace's façade was inaugurated on 29 March 2006 by King Carl XVI Gustaf. The former lighting was from the 1960s, and its wattage had been reduced over the years, making the palace perceived as progressively darker.

The new lights were approved after long discussions and tests. They deliver almost twice as much luminous flux as the old ones and use half the energy. The lighting was made by a collaboration between the National Property Board of Sweden, the Office of the Governor of the Royal Palaces, The Royal Architect Johan Celsing and the Municipality of Stockholm Traffic Control. The color is described as neutral warm-white.

According to Johan Celsing, the lighting is supposed to enhance the distribution and nuances of the palace and bring out decorative details not previously visible during the evenings. An example of this is the eastern façade where the wings facing the Skeppsbron are now illuminated.

=== Renovations ===
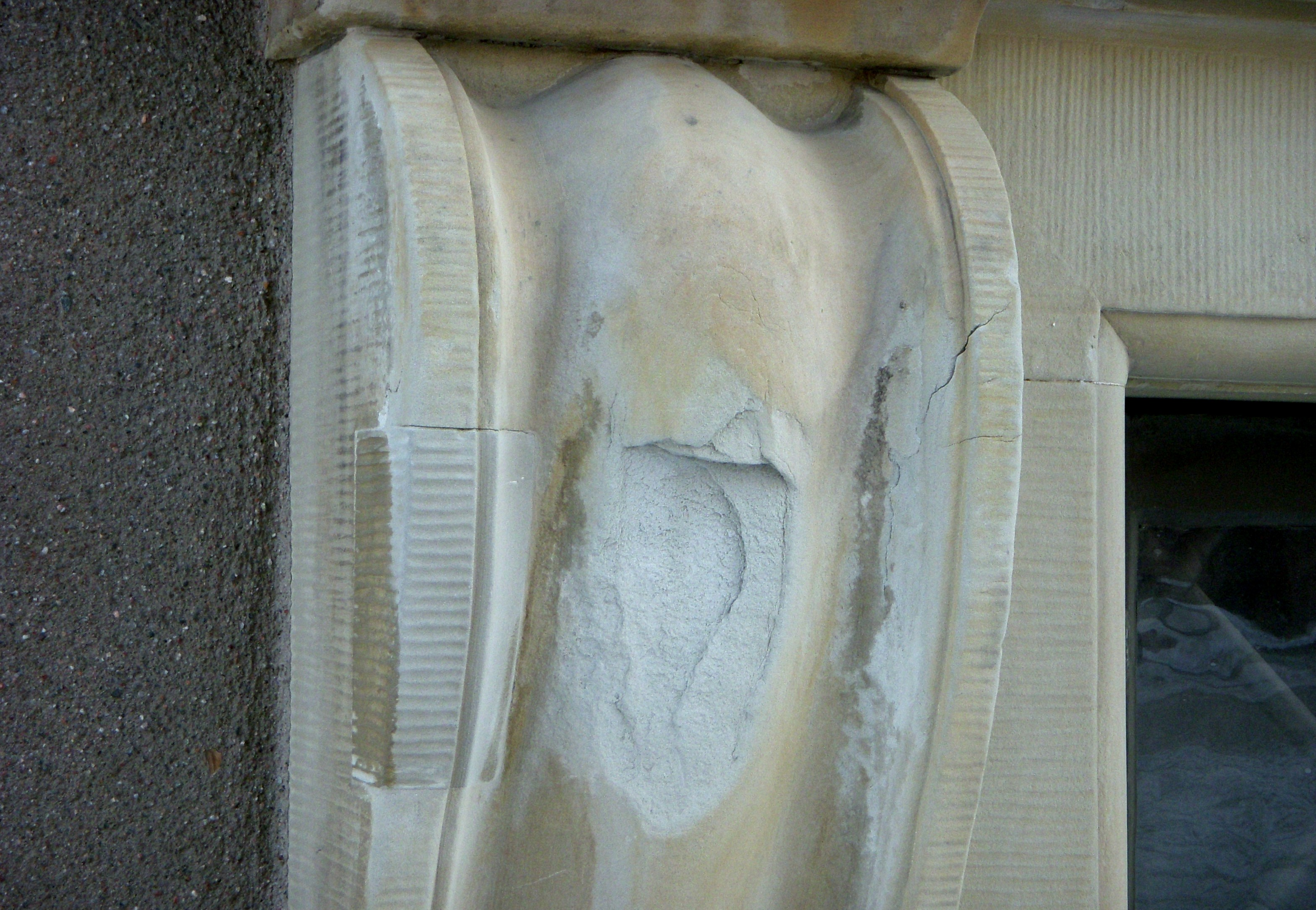
Weather-damage on a sandstone cantilever and a previous patching

Renovation of the 922 windows in the palace started at the beginning of the 1990s. The age of the windows varies from the mid-18th century to the 1970s. The reason for the renovation was that the windows had not been properly maintained for a number of years. The windows on the south side were the most exposed and the sun had burned the surface causing rot. The renovation of the windows was carried out in collaboration with the National Property Board of Sweden, the Office of the Governor of the Royal Palaces, the Swedish National Heritage Board and the Royal Architect at that time, Ove Hidemark. The work was done in a workshop at the Inner Courtyard and took about ten years. Each window was custom made for the opening where it was originally placed, making the size and shape of each window unique.

As of 2014, the palace is undergoing a comprehensive renovation. Almost half of the area of the façade is made of sandstone from Gotland, as well as the decorations such as sculptures and ornaments. In 2008, the National Property Board of Sweden, which is responsible for the maintenance of the palace, found that the sandstone had partially disintegrated and the weathering was only getting worse. Among the incidents was a piece of stone weighing 3 kg (6.6 lb) falling from 20 m (66 ft). Most damaged were the sunlit parts, the façades facing south and west. As an interim solution, the Property Board had some parts of the façade covered by a black net to catch any falling rocks.

Ever since the palace was built in the 18th century, the weathering of the sandstone has been a problem and this has accelerated since the oil paint was removed from the stone during the renovation in the 1890s. In the spring of 2008, the Property Board started a comprehensive study on order to make a long-term plan for maintenance of the palace during the next 50 years. The study showed that the Gotlandic sandstone was in worse condition than expected. A number of stones were cracked and loose.

The biggest façade renovation in the history of the palace started in May 2011. Starting with the east wing of the northern row at Strömbron, all the façades will be renovated during the following 22 years, each stage of the work being one year, at a cost of 500 million crowns. To accomplish this, the Swedish National Heritage Board is planning to open up a sandstone quarry on Gotland and start a masonry school.

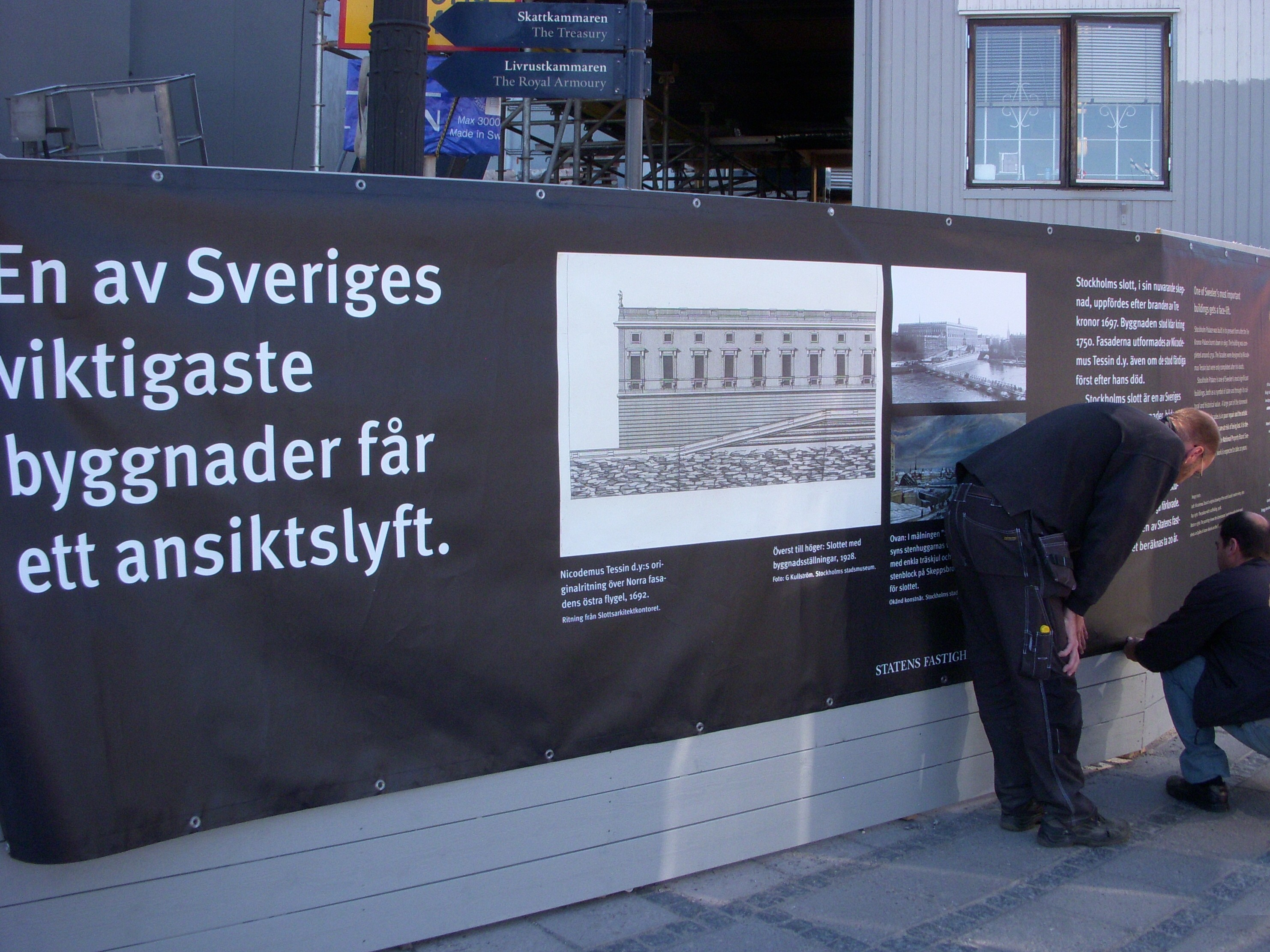
The National Property Board of Sweden posts information, 2011

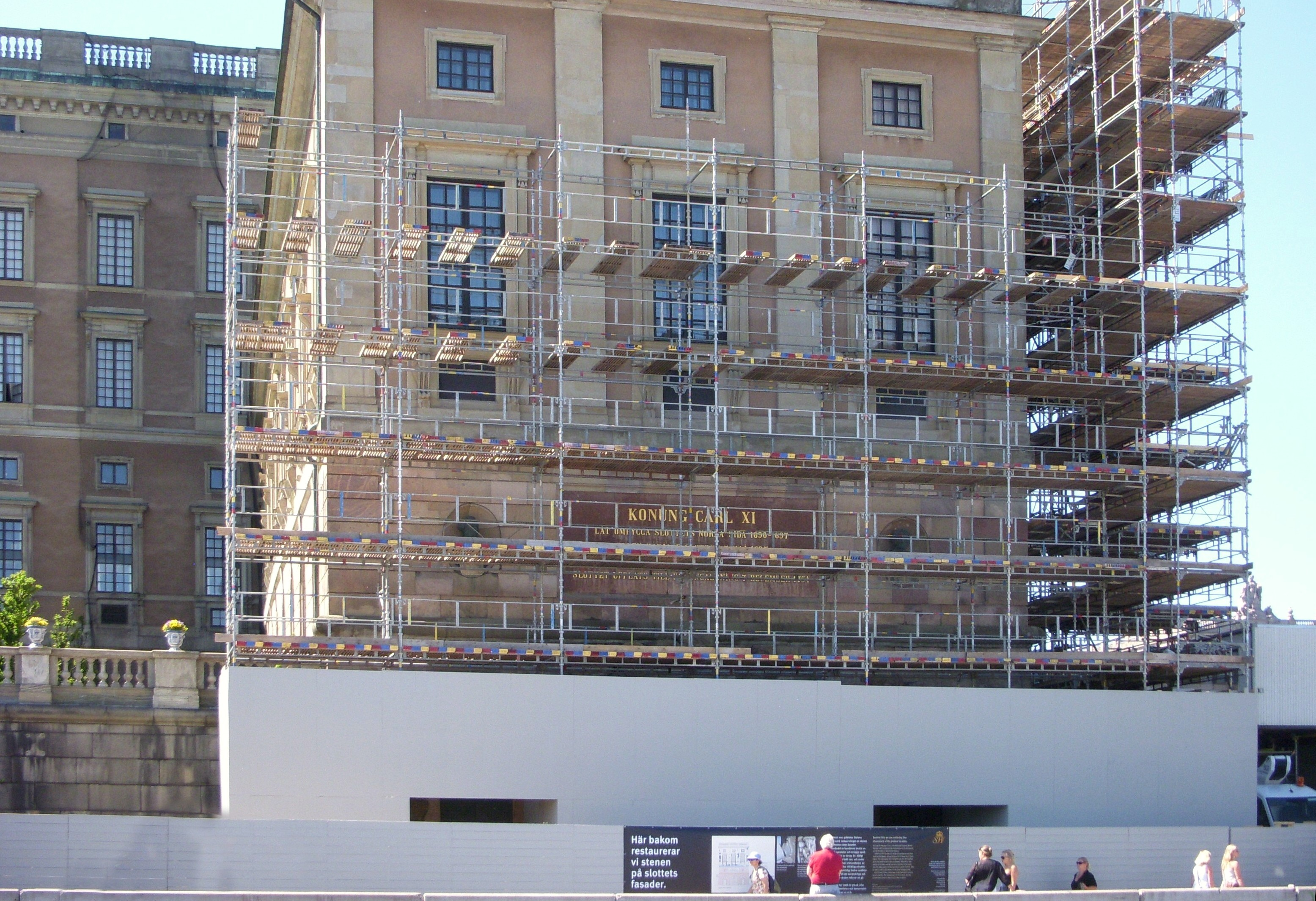
Renovation of the northern row, June 2011

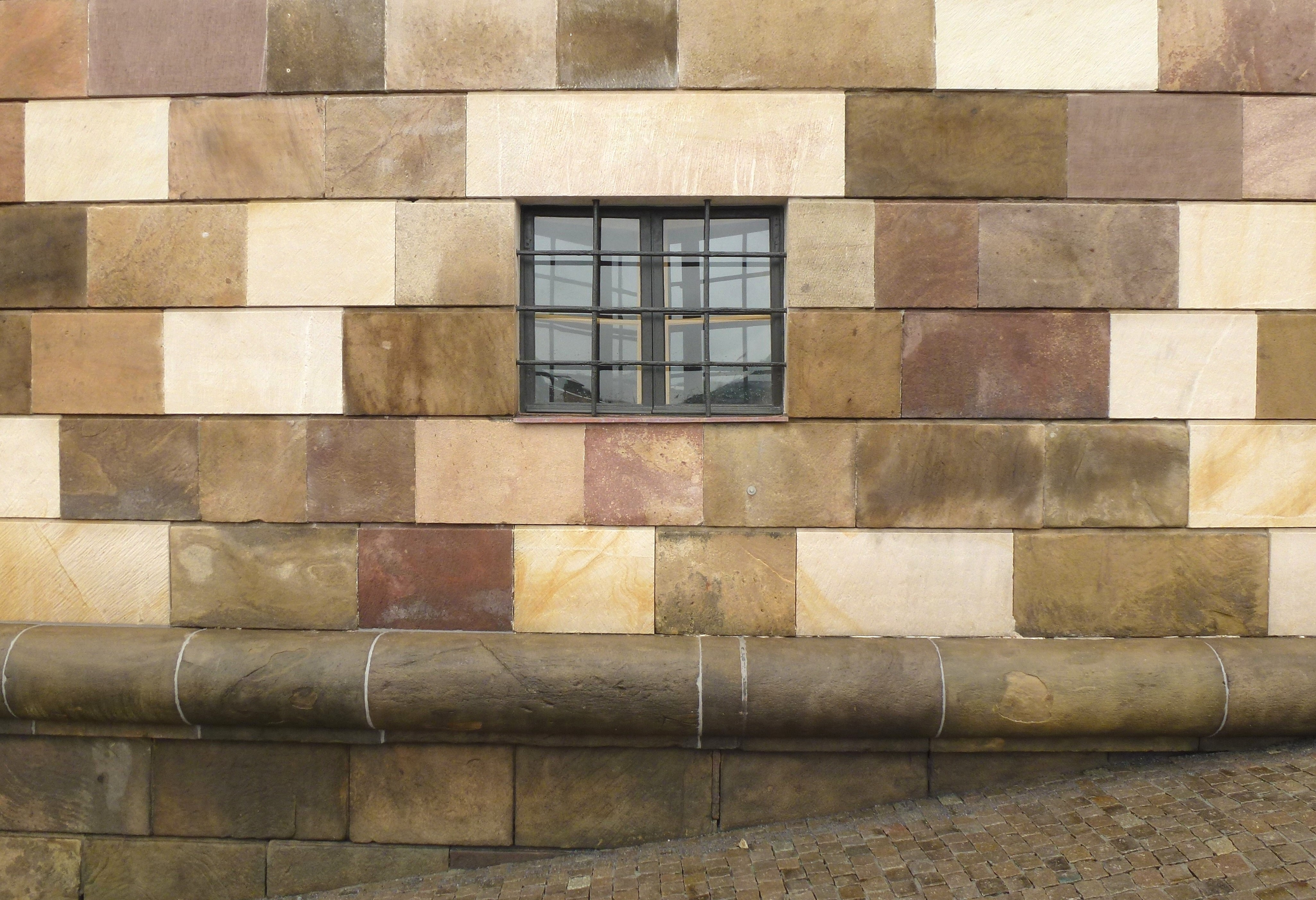
The northern row, a ground-floor apartment after the renovation, June 2011

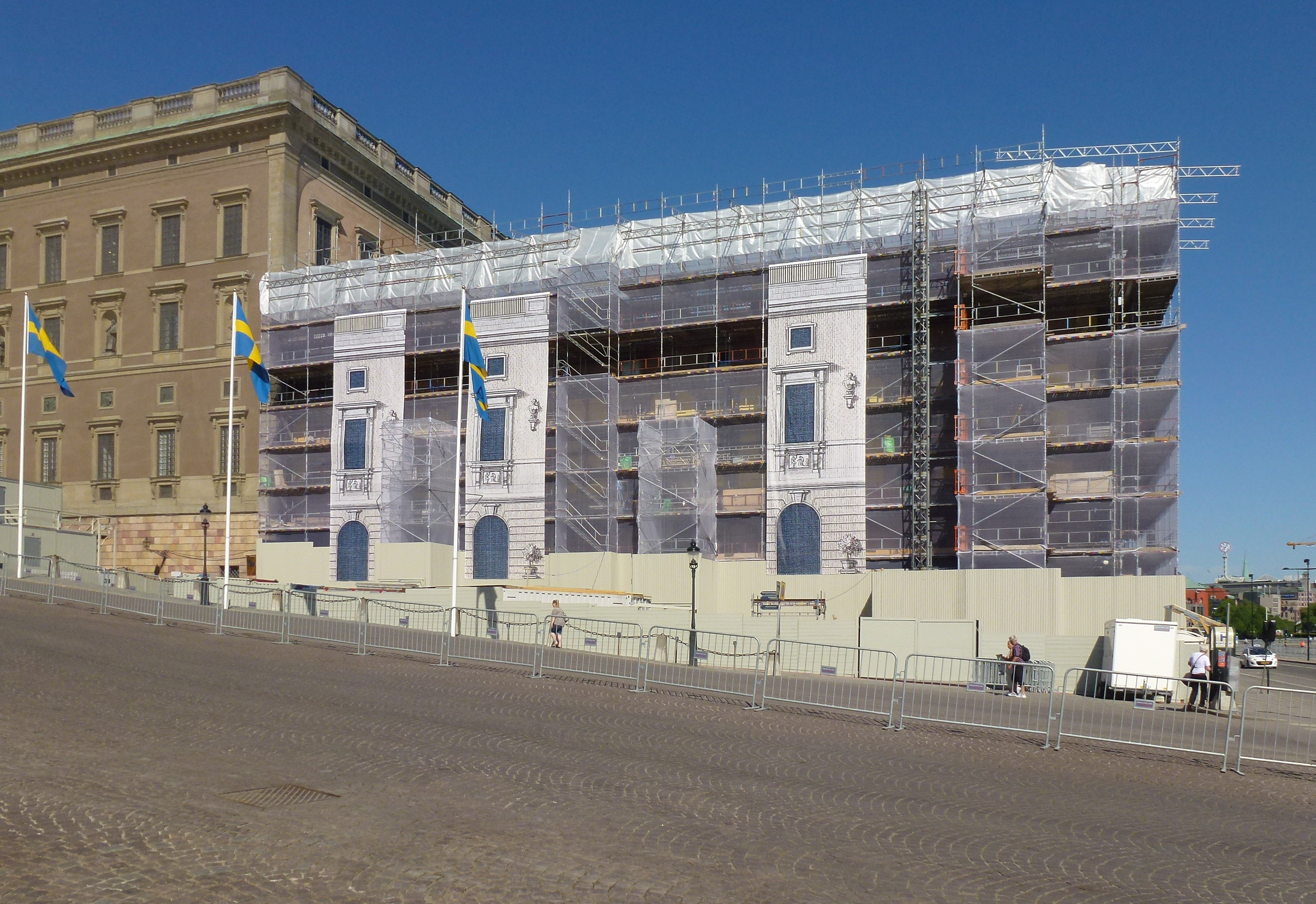
The southern façade, the east wing, June 2011

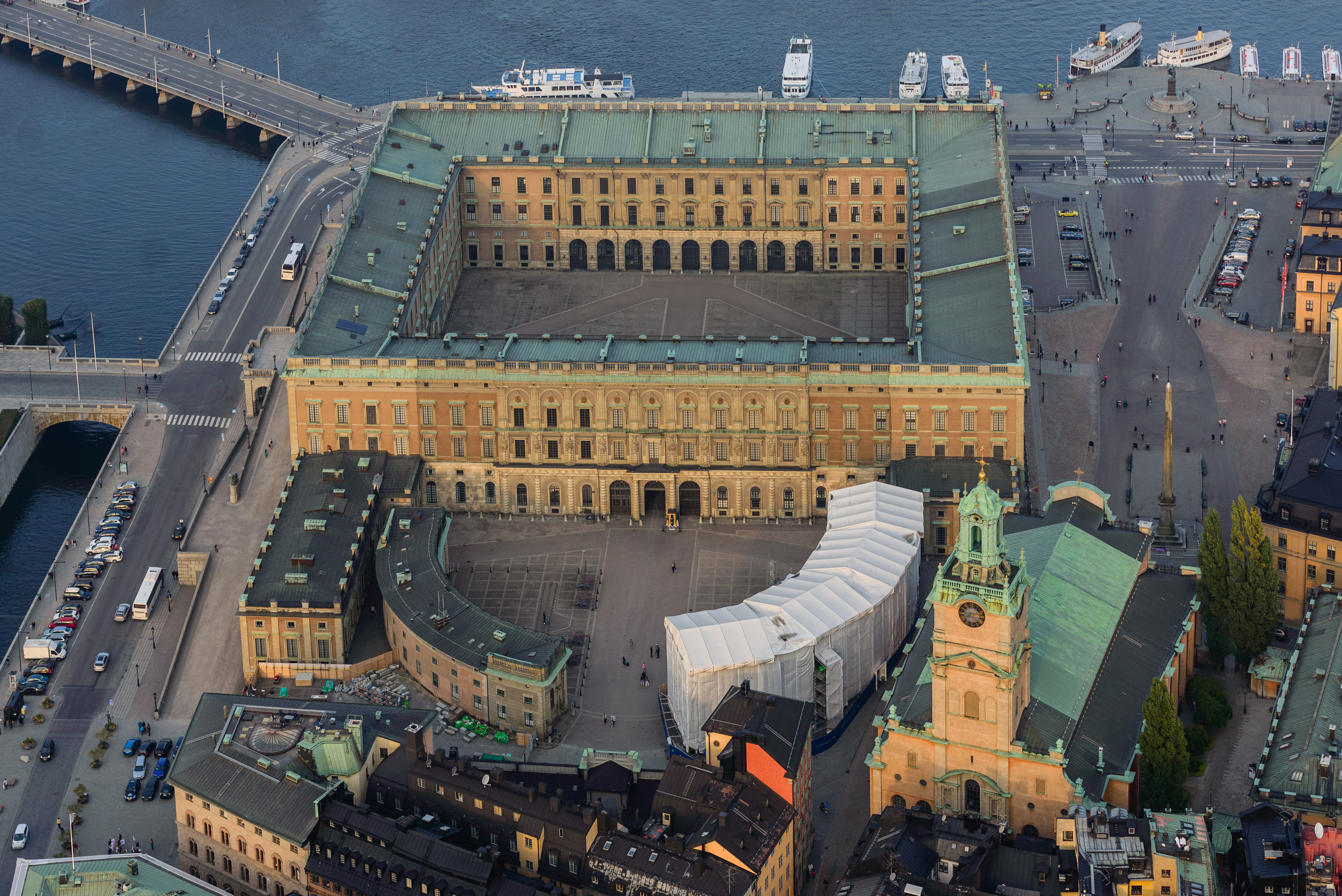
The palace in September 2014, built according to Tessin's plan.

== Interior ==
=== Overview ===
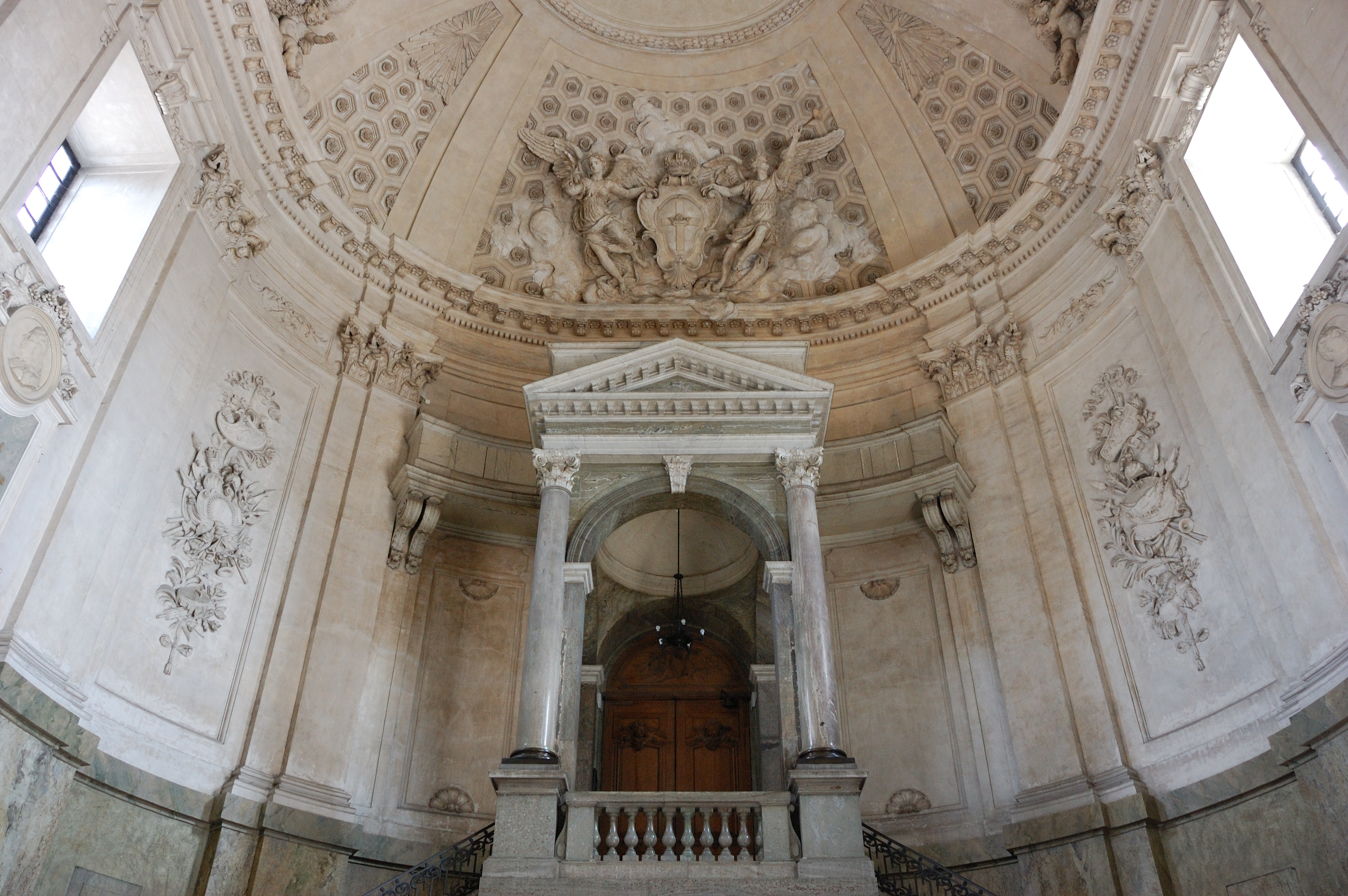
The ceiling in the south stairwell

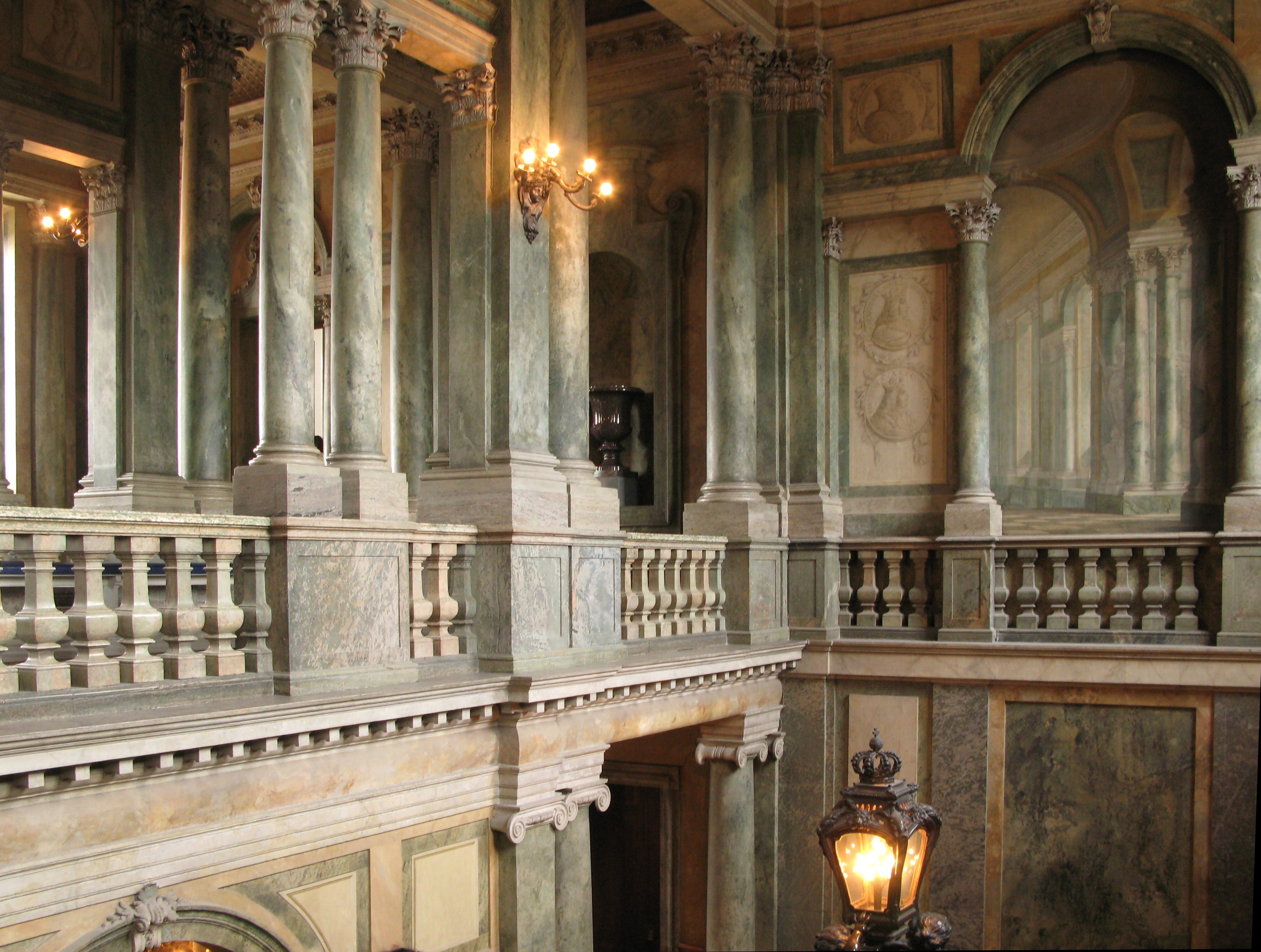
The top of the west stairwell

The palace has 1,430 rooms, of which 660 have windows.

In addition to the text on the plans below, the northeast wing is in the upper right-hand corner and the south curved wing is in the lower left-hand corner. The northwest Chancery Wing is in the upper left-hand corner on the plans. The yards are (from left to right): the Outer Courtyard (inside the curved wings), the Inner Courtyard (in the middle of the building) and the Shot Yard (between the east wings).

The floors (the number of rooms are excluding smaller rooms, closets, stairwells, vaults etc.):

- The cellar. There are 104 rooms in the cellar, most of which have been used as storage and prisons. The remains of the old Tre Kronor castle are visible there. Some parts of the cellar are divided into two cellar floors due to large differences in head room in the different sections. The royal wine cellar could be found under the western row during the end of the 1800s and the 1900s, and it is most likely still there.
- The Ground Floor is the largest floor of the palace. The rooms there have mostly been used by the staff of the court, and there are also the four portals (or arches) that make up the entrances to the palace as well as the Hall of State and the Royal Chapel.
- The Half Floor, or the mezzanine, has 115 rooms. Most of the rooms have retained their size since the construction of the palace, but their use has varied. The name is derived from the fact that the floor is just half as high as the other floors. The rooms have mostly been used by the staff of the court, but some of the princes' and princesses' apartments have also been there. The mezzanine also houses the Small Guest Apartment, consisting of a couple of rooms in the north part of the western row.
- The First Floor has 67 rooms. The rooms have mostly retained their size since the construction of the palace, but their use has varied. The Bernadotte Apartments and the Pillar Hall are in the northern row, and the eastern row houses the private quarters. This is where King Carl XVI Gustaf and his family lived until they moved to the Drottningholm Palace in 1981.
- The Second Floor, has 57 rooms. Most of the rooms have retained their size since the construction of the palace, but their use has varied. The Guest Apartments, the State Apartments with the ball room the Vita Havet (the White Sea), the Cabinet Meeting Room and Prince Bertil's Apartment are on this floor.
- The Attic, has about 25 rooms, as well as the upper part and the arches forming the ceiling for the Hall of State, the Royal Chapel and the southern stairwell. The attic is mainly used for storage.
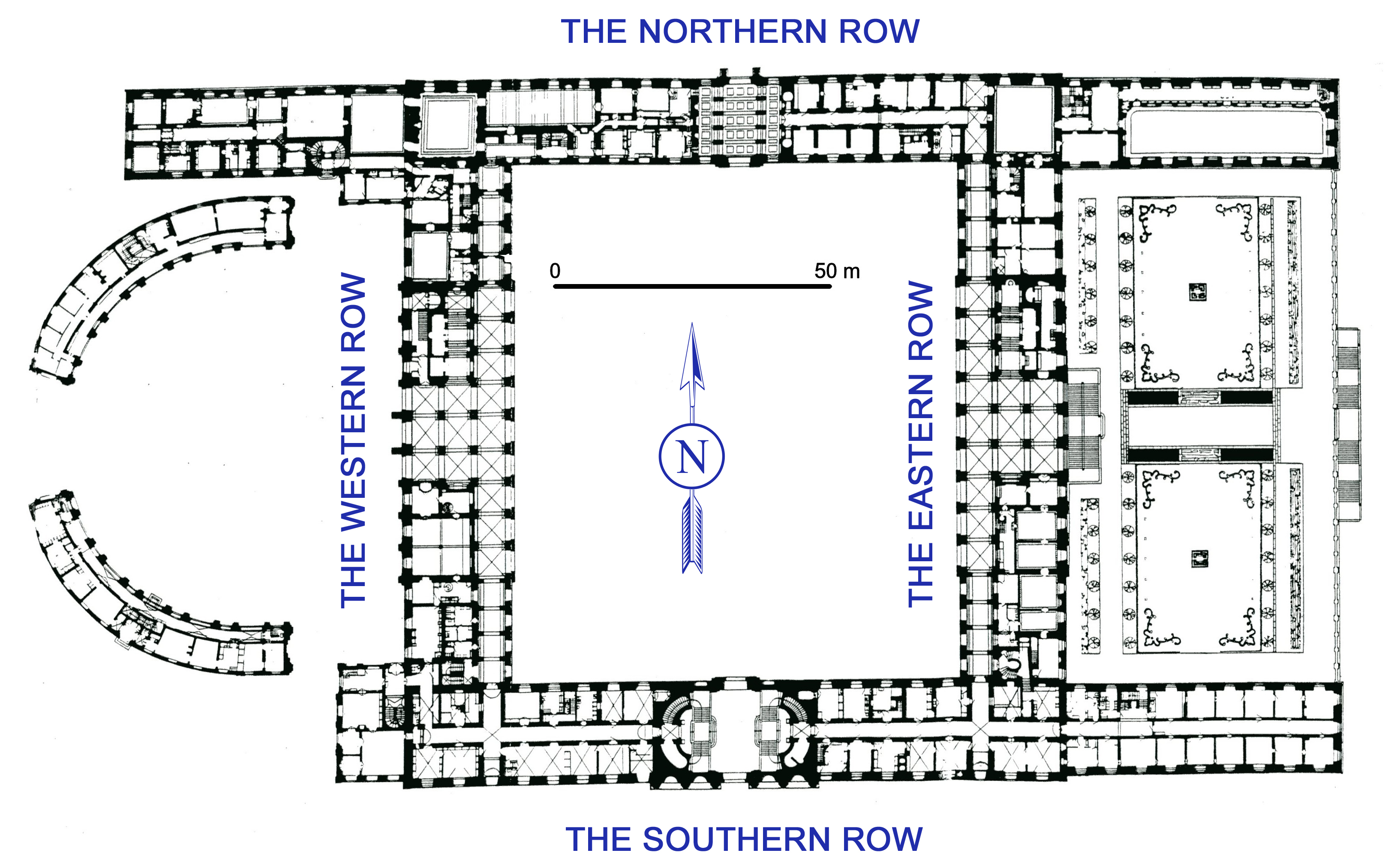
Ground floor

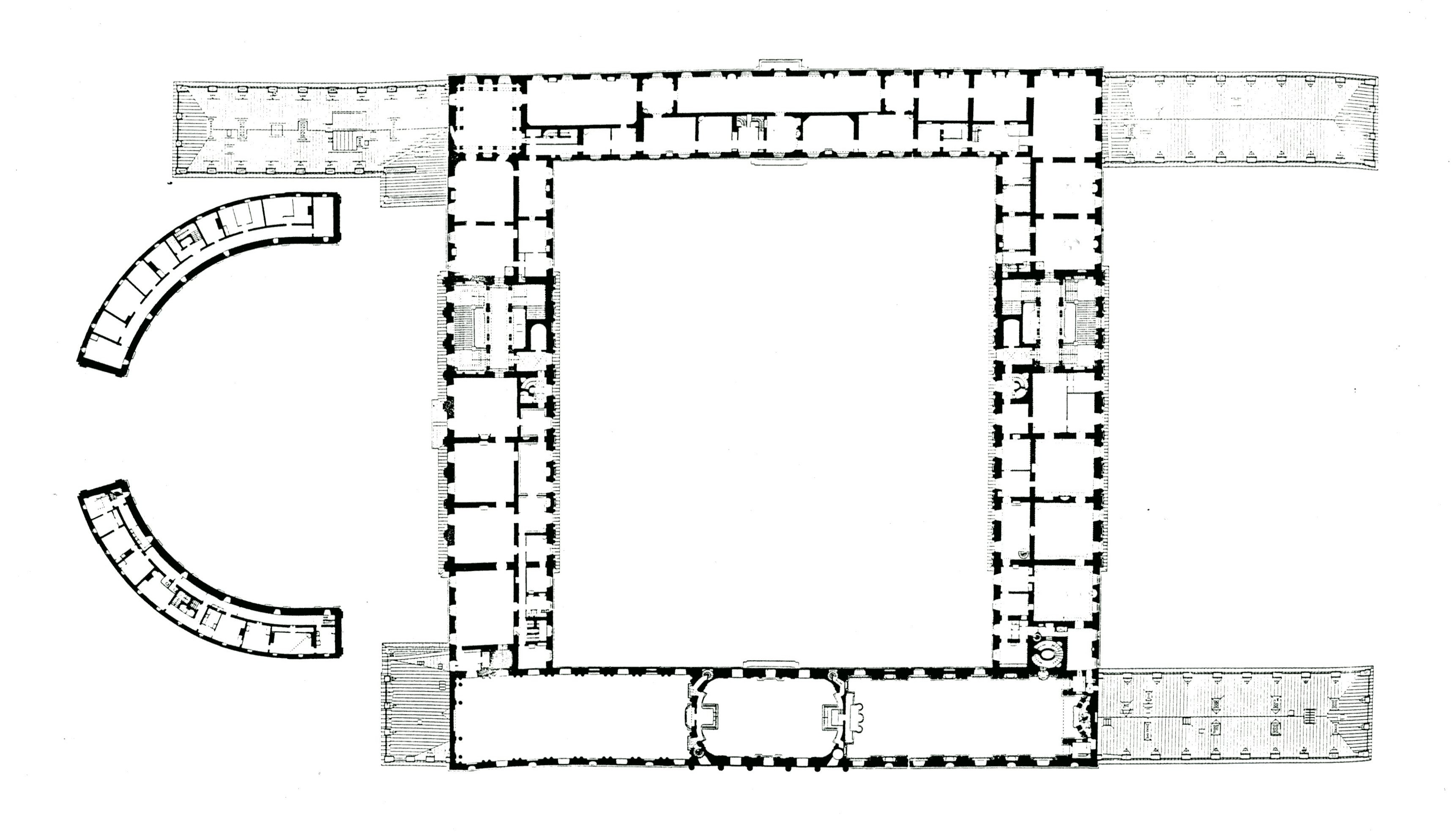
First floor

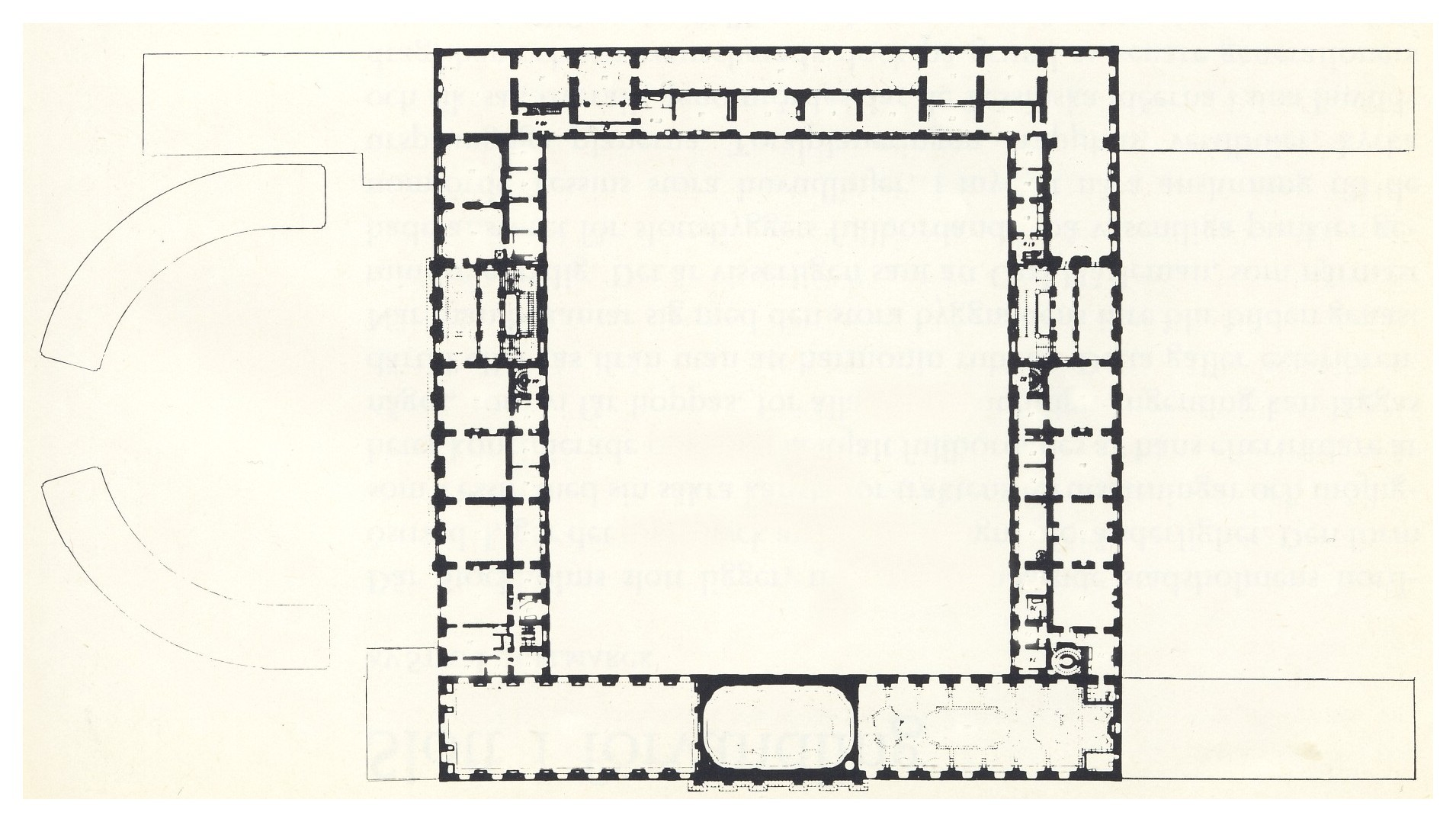
Second floor

Floor	The Southern Row	The Western Row	The Northern Row	The Eastern Row	The Northeast Wing	The Southwest Wing	The Northwest Wing	The North Curved Wing	The South Curved Wing
2	The Hall of State, The Royal Chapel	The Guest Apartments	The State Apartments	Prince Bertil's Apartment	-	-	-	-	-
1	The Hall of State, The Royal Chapel	The Apartments of the Orders of Chivalry	The Bernadotte Apartments	Princess Sibylla's Apartment	-	-	-	-	-
½	The Hall of State, The Royal Chapel	Royal Court of Sweden	Office	Office	The Upper; Middle Gallery	Not available	Not available	Not available	Not available
ground	Royal Court of Sweden (with the Office of the Governor of the Royal Palaces' room and Office of the Royal Architect)				The Bernadotte library	Royal Court of Sweden (with the office of the Hofmarschall)	The Chancery Wing	The Royal Guards	The Royal Gift Shop
Basement	The Treasury	The Tre Kronor Museum		Livrustkammaren	Gustav III's Museum of Antiquities	Livrustkammaren	Slottsarkivet	Storage	Storage

=== The Western Row ===
==== The Guest Apartments ====
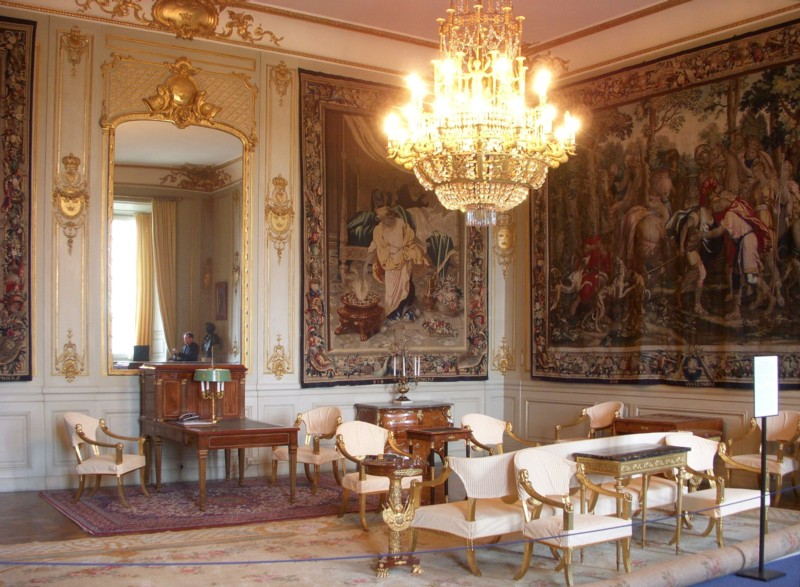
Meleagersalongen (The Meleager Room), the Guest Apartments

The Guest Apartments (also known as the Grand Guest Apartments) are on the second floor in the south part of the western row and are used for visiting heads of state at state visits to Sweden. The rooms got their original interior in the 1760s, under the direction of Jean Eric Rehn when they were set in order for the Prince Frederick Adolf, the brother of King Gustav III. Three of the rooms that are shown to the public are in the mezzanine suite of rooms with windows facing the Inner Courtyard.

==== The Apartments of the Orders of Chivalry ====
The Apartments of the Orders of Chivalry are in the south part on the first floor of the western row and consists of four halls, one for each order: The Royal Order of the Seraphim, Order of the Sword, Order of the Polar Star and Order of Vasa. In the Apartments of the Orders there are permanent exhibitions about the Royal Orders. Formerly, this is where the Privy Council had their apartments in the mid-1750s. They were succeeded by the Supreme Court of Sweden who used the halls of the Apartments from 1789 to 1949.

=== The Eastern Row ===
==== Prince Bertil's Apartment ====
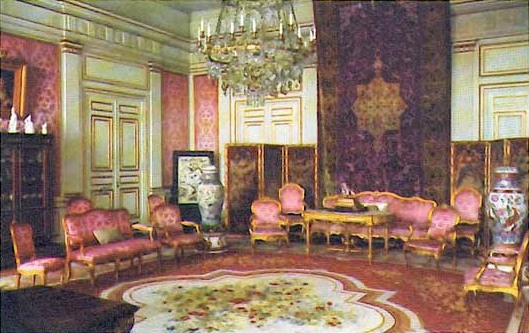
Skära salongen (The Pink Drawing room), Prince Bertil's apartment

The rooms on the second floor of the eastern row is called the Prins Bertil's Apartment after its latest noted tenant. King Adolf Frederick used the rooms as his own apartment. During the reign of King Gustav III, it was Duke Charles' apartment and later when King Charles XIV ruled, it was used for some time by Crown Prince Oscar (I). Oscar had one of the rooms decorated in a neo-gothic style in 1828. The room became known as the Götiska (the Geatish Room). King Charles XV also used the apartment as his quarters and during the reign of King Oscar II it was used by the Crown Prince Gustaf (V). Later it was Prince Bertil's apartment until he died in 1997. After the prince's demise it has been used for visiting heads of state, interviews and seminars.

==== Princess Sibylla's Apartment ====
The Princess Sibylla's Apartment, named after the Princess Sibylla of Saxe-Coburg and Gotha, is on the first floor in the south part of the eastern row and is used as the everyday reception rooms for the King and Queen, and is not open to the public. During the history of the palace, the apartment have always been a part of the palace where the king or one of his close relatives has lived. The apartment is known for the Blue Drawing room where the engagements of King Carl XVI Gustaf and Silvia Sommerlath in 1976, as well as Crown Princess Victoria and Daniel Westling in 2009, were declared. The Princess Sibylla's Inner Drawing room, formerly known as Crown Prince Gustaf's audience chamber, still have some interior designed by Carl Hårleman, such as pilasters and ornamentations over the lintels of the doors.

==== Livrustkammaren ====
The main area of the Livrustkammaren museum is in the cellars under the eastern row and is accessed from the Slottsbacken. It is the oldest museum in Sweden, founded by King Gustavus Adolphus in 1628, and contains objects associated with Swedish royalty from the time of the Swedish Empire and onwards.

=== The Northern Row ===
==== The State Apartments ====
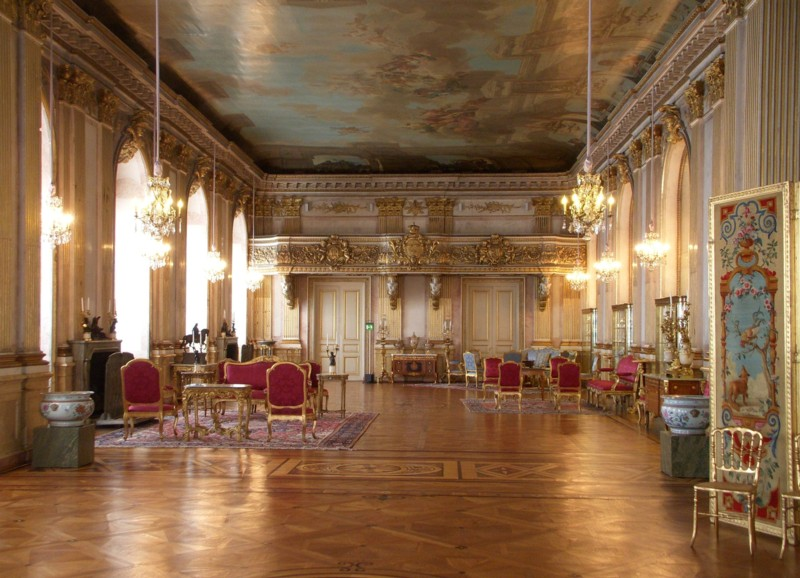
Vita havet (The White Sea ball room), the State Apartments

The State Apartments, also known as the Apartment for Festivities, are on the second floor of the northern row and are used for the Royal Couple's receptions and representation. Official dinners are held in the Charles XI's Gallery on such occasions as state visits, after elections to the Riksdag and for the Nobel laureates. Since 1950, it is used as the main banqueting room of the palace and can accommodate about 200 seated guests. Five to ten official dinners are held in the gallery each year. A couple of times each year a Cabinet Meeting is held with the Swedish government in the Cabinet Meeting Room. The apartment was originally designed as the Royal Couple's apartment, but when King Adolf Frederick and Queen Lovisa Ulrika moved into the palace in 1754, they chose to stay in the part now known as the Bernatotte Apartments. Later, the Crown Prince Gustav (III) and Sophia Magdalena would use the apartments after their wedding in 1766. The apartments have not been used as living quarters since the time of Oscar I.

In the northeast corner of the State Apartments is the ball room the Vita Havet (the White Sea) which used to be two rooms: the queen's dining hall and the hall for the trabants. The dining hall was called the White Sea, a name that was inherited for the resulting hall after the wall had been removed. In connection to dinners in the Charles XI's Gallery, the White Sea is furnished as a salon with sofas, chairs and coffee tables. On those occasions, the room is used as a drawing room after the dinners.

==== The Bernadotte Apartments ====
The Bernadotte Apartments are on the first floor of the northern row and are named after Sweden's current royal house, Bernadotte. The name of the suite is derived from a collection of portraits in the Bernadotte Gallery, the largest room in the apartments, depicting members of the Bernadotte House. Most of the rooms are in the northern row and are used for audiences, awarding medals and for meetings with the Advisory Council on Foreign Affairs. The rooms are also open to the public. The apartment was originally decorated in the 1730s and 1740s by Carl Hårleman. When King Adolf Frederick and Queen Lovisa Ulrica moved in there in 1754, the rooms were furnished with pieces of furniture made by the best craftsmen in Stockholm at that time. The last Royal Couple to use the apartment as living quarters were King Oscar II and Queen Sophia. Since then, some rooms have been restored to their original 18th-century appearance, while others are maintained as they were at the time of King Oscar II, such as his writing room.

==== The Exhibitions Apartments ====
On the ground floor of the northern row are the Exhibition Apartments which are used for special exhibitions and public lectures.

==== The Tre Kronor Museum ====
In the cellars, accessed from street level under Lejonbacken, of the northern and western row is the Tre Kronor Museum. The museum is in the rooms that used to be kitchens in the Tre Kronor Castle and are thus the oldest rooms in the palace, but the museum itself is the newest of the museums in the palace. It was inaugurated in 1999 and houses an exhibition about the old castle Tre Kronor which was destroyed during a fire in 1697.

=== The Southern Row ===
==== The Royal Chapel ====
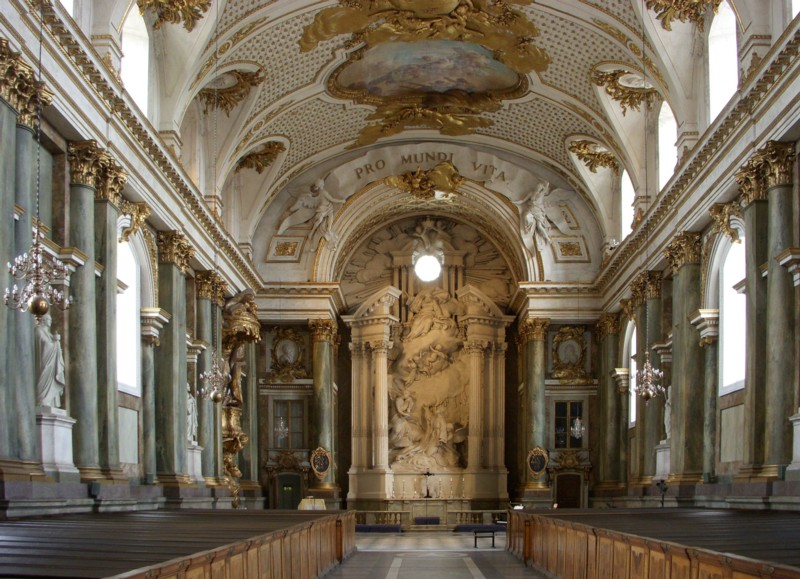
Slottskyrkan (The Royal Chapel), the southern row

The Royal Chapel was built during the 18th century, and it is the parish church for the members of the Royal Parish. The church is situated in the east half of the southern row of the palace. It is as wide as the building and two and a half stories high. The entrance of the church is in the South Portal (or Arch) at the address Slottsbacken 1. Service is held every Sunday and holy day, and the royal family use the church for ceremonies. Before the old Tre Kronor castle burned down, the Royal Chapel was in the northern row, some benches and silver decorations from the old church are still preserved in the chapel. After fire in 1697, when Tessin planned the new palace, the Royal Chapel and the Hall of State were placed in the southern row and these, including the grand stairs, occupies the first and second floor. The chapel represented the divine power and the hall the worldly, or the king's, power. After Tessin's death, his work was completed by Carl Hårleman. The church was inaugurated at the same time as the rest of the palace in 1754.

==== The Hall of State ====
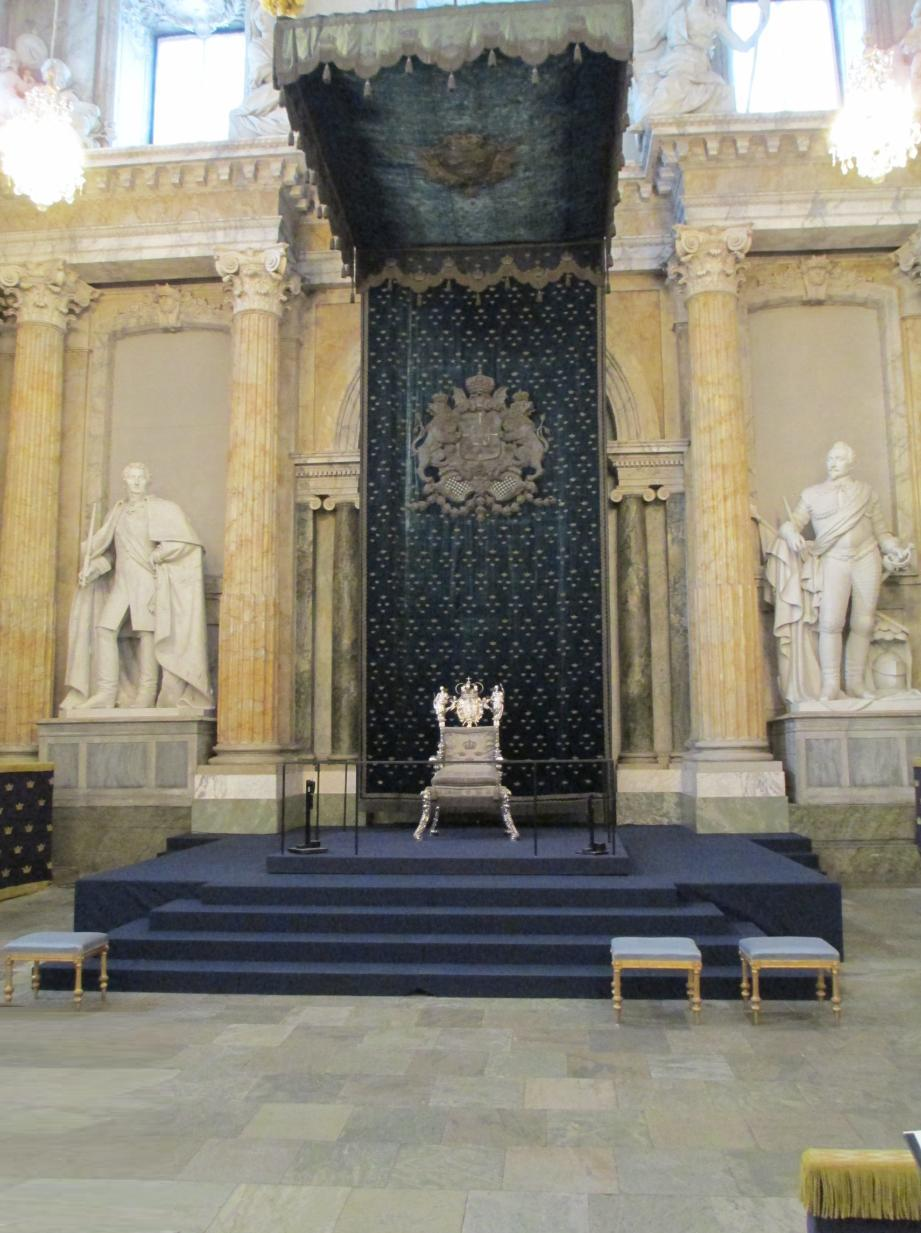
Throne room, "Hall of State", Rikssalen in 2015

The Hall of State is in the west half of the southern row of the palace and is two stories high (first and second floor). It was introduced for the Riksdag of 1755. The hall was designed by Hårleman who modified Tessin's plans. The Silver Throne of Queen Christina is placed in the Hall. The main entrance of the Hall is in the South Portal (or Arch).

==== The Treasury ====
In the cellar of the southern row is the Treasury, where the Regalia of Sweden are displayed. The museum was inaugurated in 1970.

=== The Northwest (Chancery) Wing ===
The Chancery Wing is another name for the northwest wing of the palace. It was planned for the central parts of the government administration, the Royal chancery. The wing was finished by architect Carl Fredrik Adelcrantz, and was originally used as the royal gardhouse, offices for domestic, foreign and war departments as well as the National Archives of Sweden. As the government administration grew, it moved from the palace and formed new independent departments, and around 1780, the Chancery Wing was transformed into an apartment for the three-year-old Crown Prince Gustav (IV) Adolf and later for his mother the Queen Dowager Sophia Magdalena. The Chancery Wing was once again the home of a prince in 1905, when it became the Crown Prince and later King Gustaf VI Adolf, who used it as his private lodgings until his death in 1973. A part of the mezzanine floor above his apartment was converted into his private library in the 1930s. The Spegelsalongen (the Mirror Hall), updated in 1866 by Fredrik Wilhelm Scholander, is in the wing as well as a Green and a Blue Drawing room. The Slottsarkivet, a part of the present National Archives of Sweden, is still in the cellars of the wing.

=== The Northeast Wing ===
==== Gustav III's Museum of Antiquities ====
The second oldest museum in Sweden is Gustav III's Museum of Antiquities in the cellars of the northeast wing, which open up for the public in 1794. The museum shows over 200 of the antique sculptures that King Gustav III bought during his journey to Italy in 1783 to 1784.

== Gallery ==
Rikssalen
(The Hall of State)
The southern row

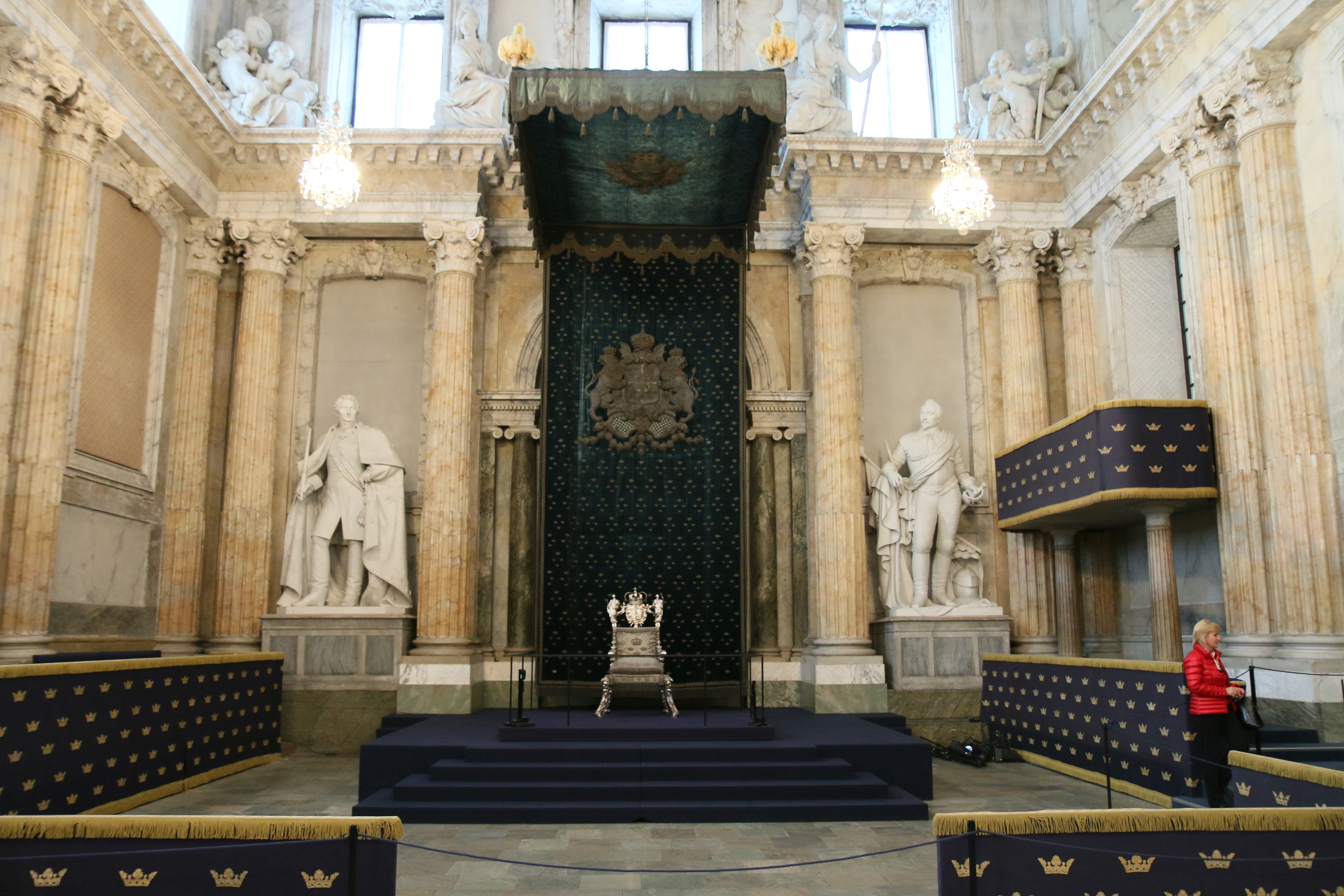
Rikssalen
(The Hall of State)

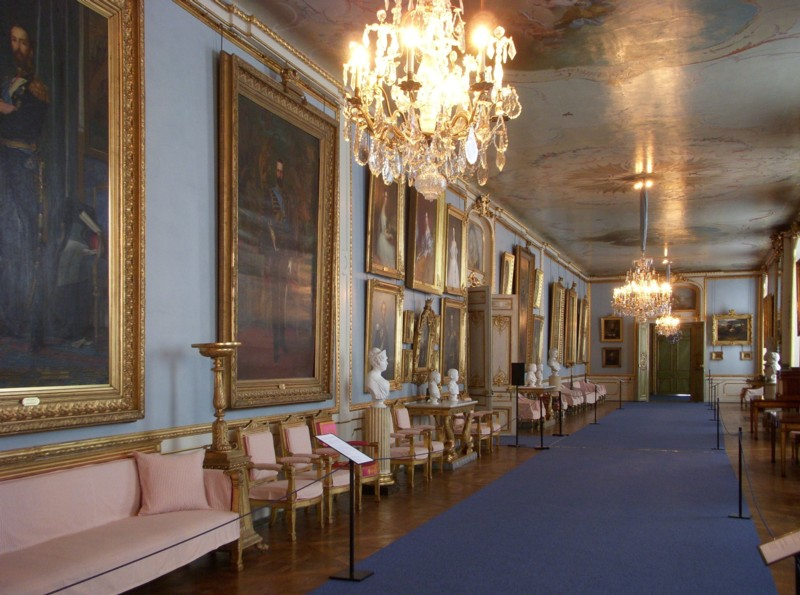
Bernadottegalleriet
(The Bernadotte Galleries)
The Bernadotte apartments

Bernadottegalleriet
(The Bernadotte Galleries)

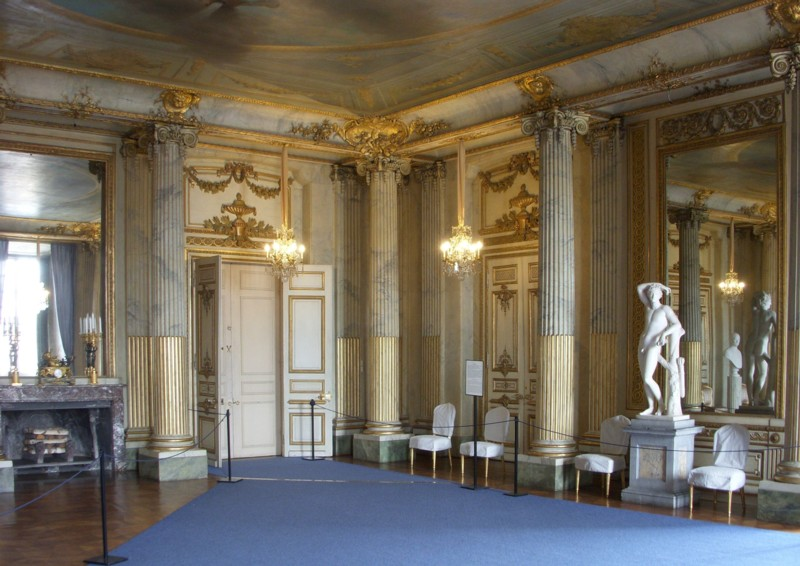
Pelarsalen
(The Pillar Hall)
The Bernadotte apartments

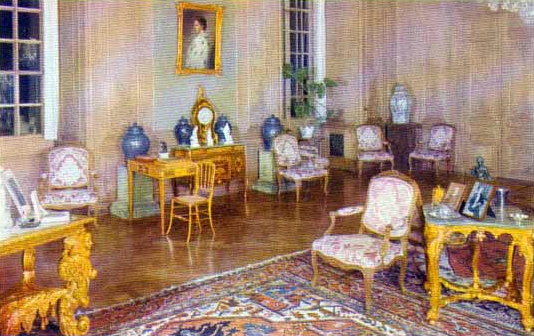
Salongen
(The Drawing room)
Queen Victoria's apartment

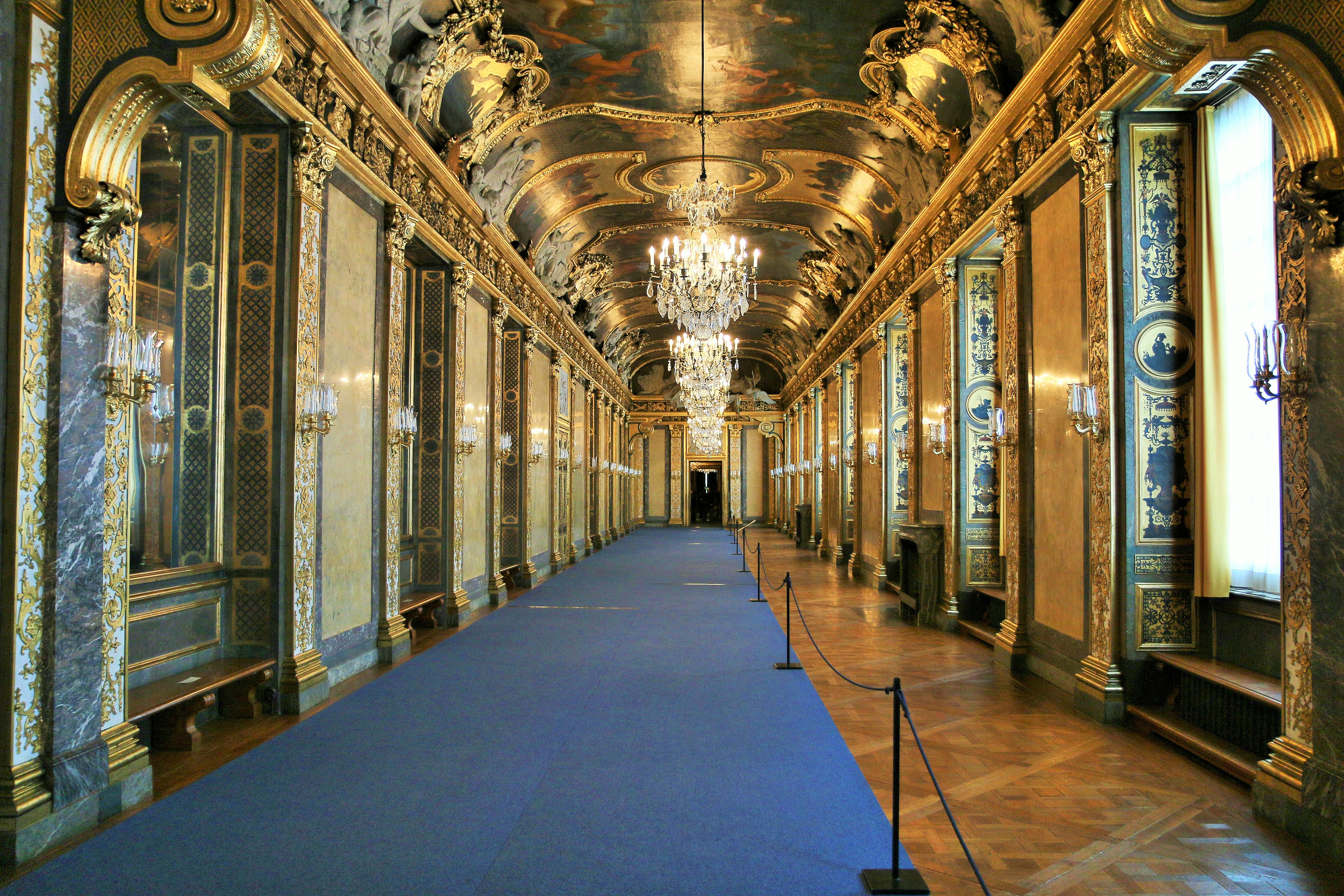
Karl XI:s galleri
(Charles XI's Gallery)
Festvåningen
(The State Apartments)

Konseljsalen
(The Cabinet Meeting Room)
Statsrådssalen (Government meeting room, when such meetings are chaired by the King)

Vita Havet
(The White Sea)
The banquet and reception hall for honored guests of the Swedish Royal Family

== Activities ==
The palace is a place of work for about 200 full-time employees, more than half of whom are female. The palace also hires more personnel for dinners, during the summer and as guides.

The palace has hosted events including the Stockholm Culture Awards ceremony.

=== The Royal Court of Sweden ===
The palace houses facilities for the offices that are part of the Royal Court of Sweden; the organization affiliated to the Swedish head of state and the Royal House, and are also responsible for preserving and showing the cultural heritage of the Swedish monarchy. The Royal Court is led by the Marshal of the Realm and had 216 full-time employees in 2009.

=== Museums ===
The museums housed in the palace are: Livrustkammaren, Gustav III's Museum of Antiquities, The Treasury and The Tre Kronor Museum.

=== Archive and library ===
In the Chancery Wing at the palace is the Slottsarkivet. The archive was started in 1893, and since 1964, it is a depot sorting under the administration of the National Archives of Sweden. The archive also contains records from the Royal Court and the Crown palaces in Sweden. In the northeast wing of the palace is the Bernadottebiblioteket (the Bernadotte library, a research library).

=== The Royal Guards ===
The Royal Guards is a guard detail that is part guard of honour for the king and part guards for the castle. The guard is also a section of the military emergency management in Stockholm. The Royal Guards are present at state ceremonies, visits by foreign heads of state or fleets. The guards were established by King Gustav I in 1523, to keep the order in the entire city, the part that is now Gamla Stan. The changing of the guards is a ceremony and tourist attraction held at the Outer Courtyard of the palace, seen by approximately 800,000 people each year.

=== The Royal Gift Shop ===
The Royal Gift Shop is the gift and souvenir shop for the palace with products connected to the objects in the royal collections. A large part of the items are books about the royal cultural heritage on subjects such as history, architecture, biographies and research. The shop is in the southwestern curved wing and is accessed from the Outer Courtyard.

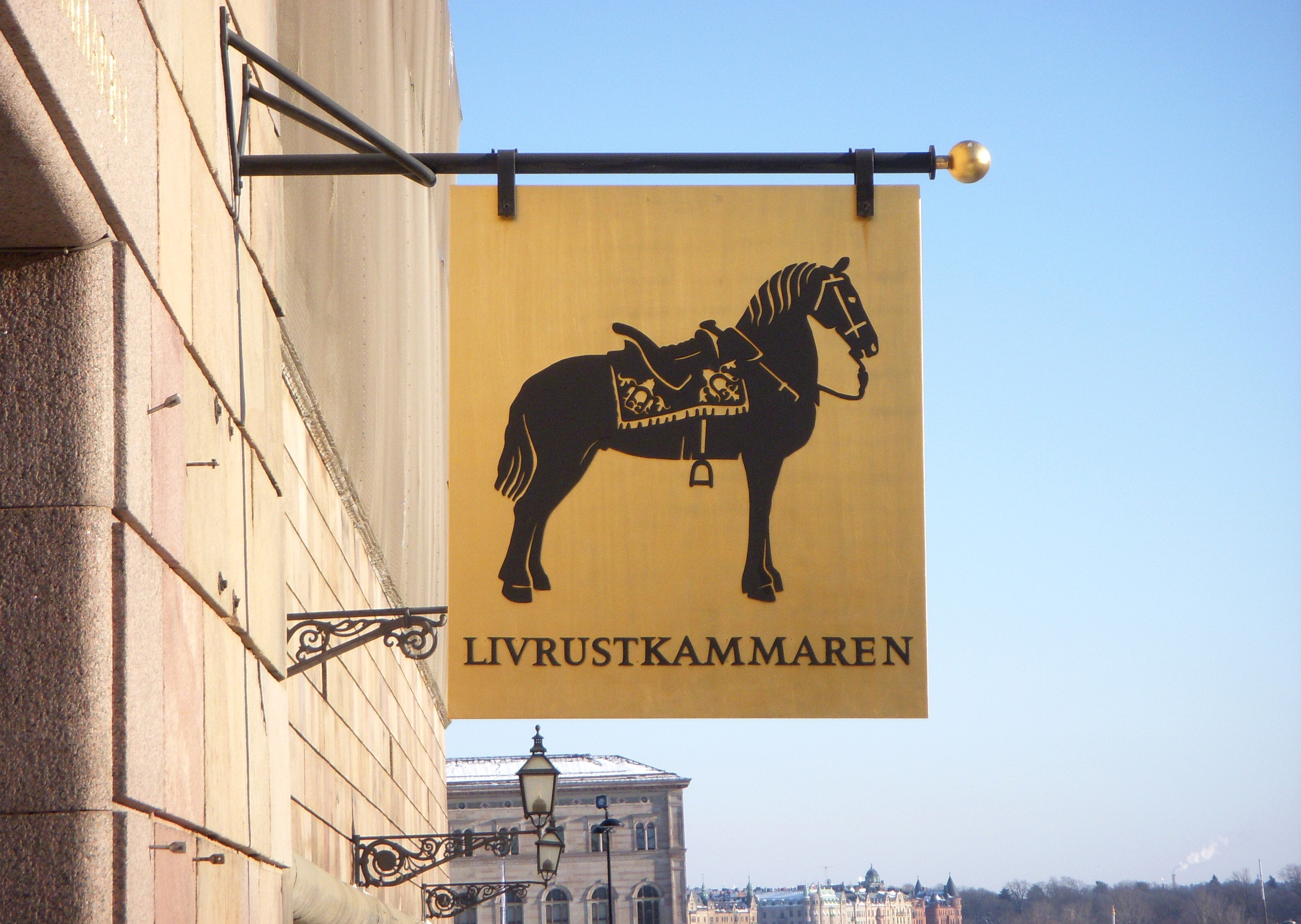
Livrustkammaren

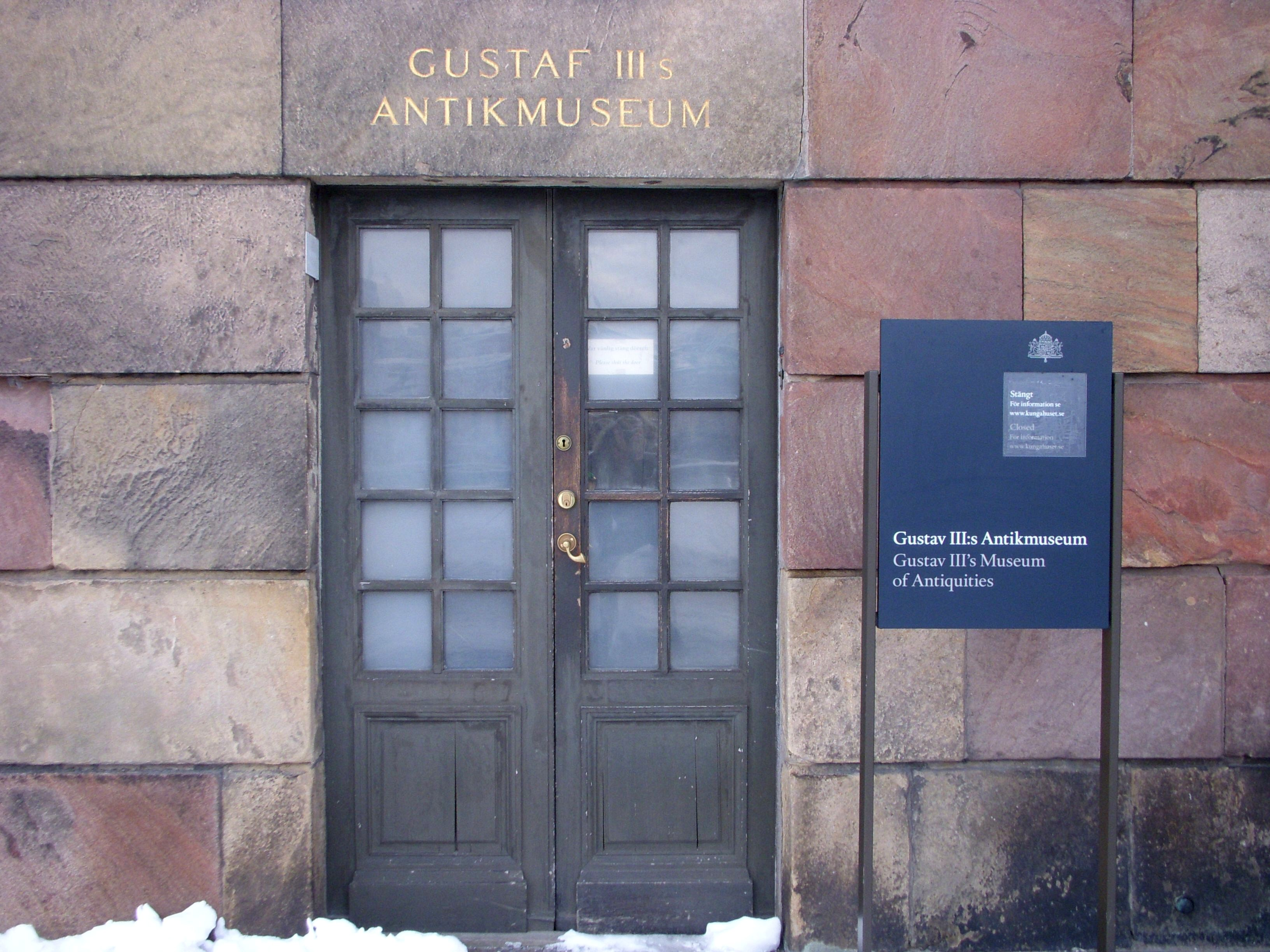
Gustav III's Museum of Antiquities

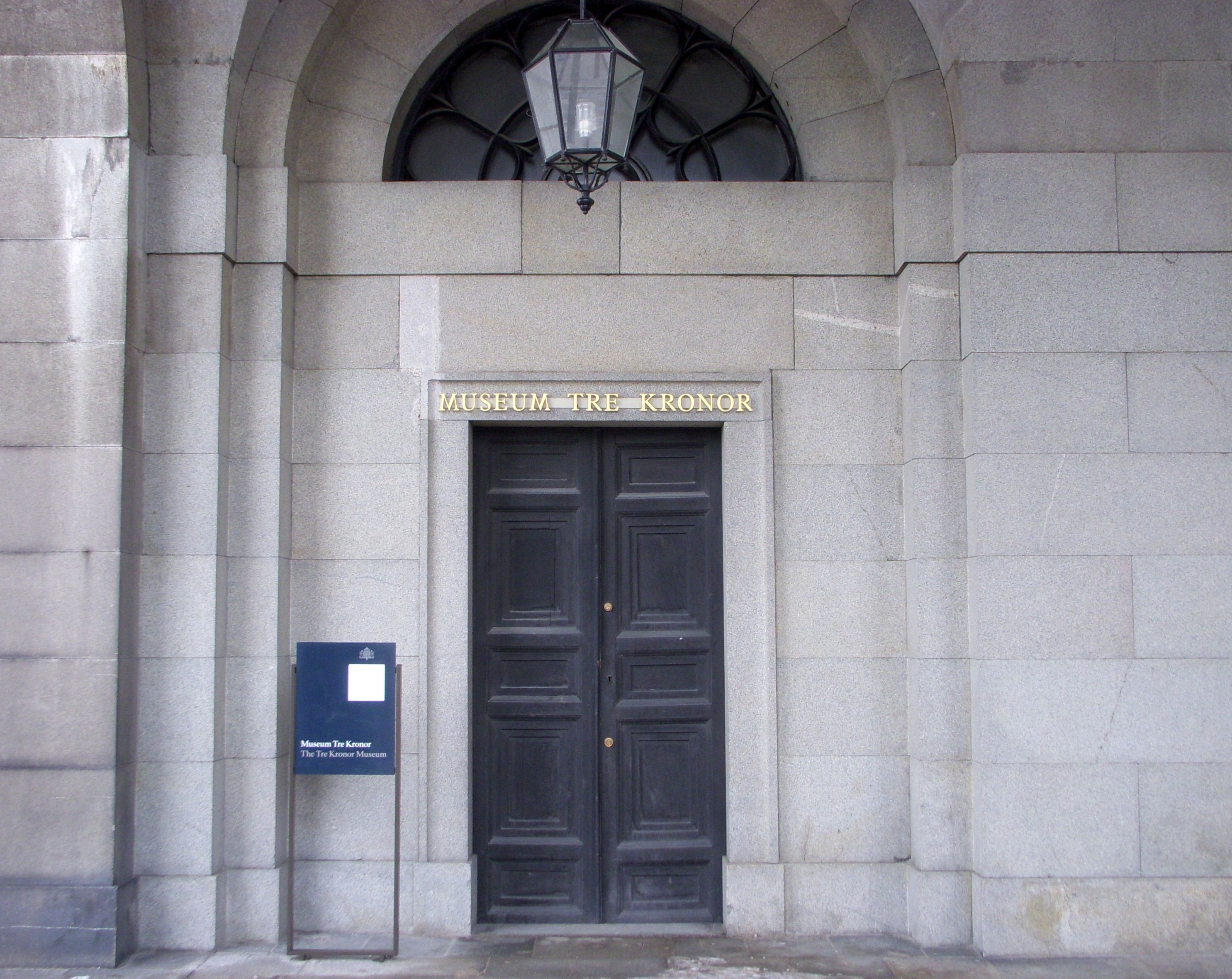
The Tre Kronor Museum

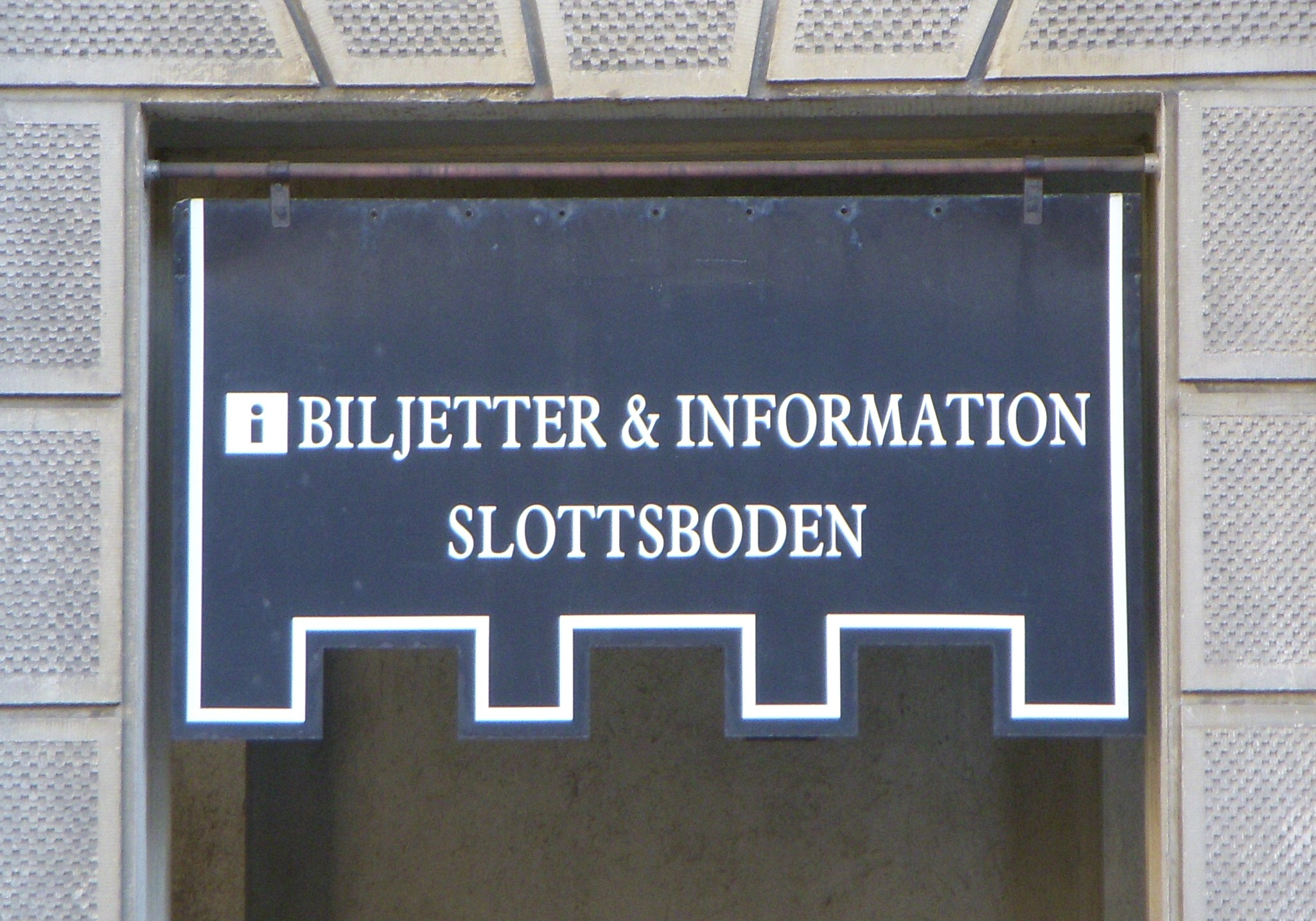
The Royal Gift Shop

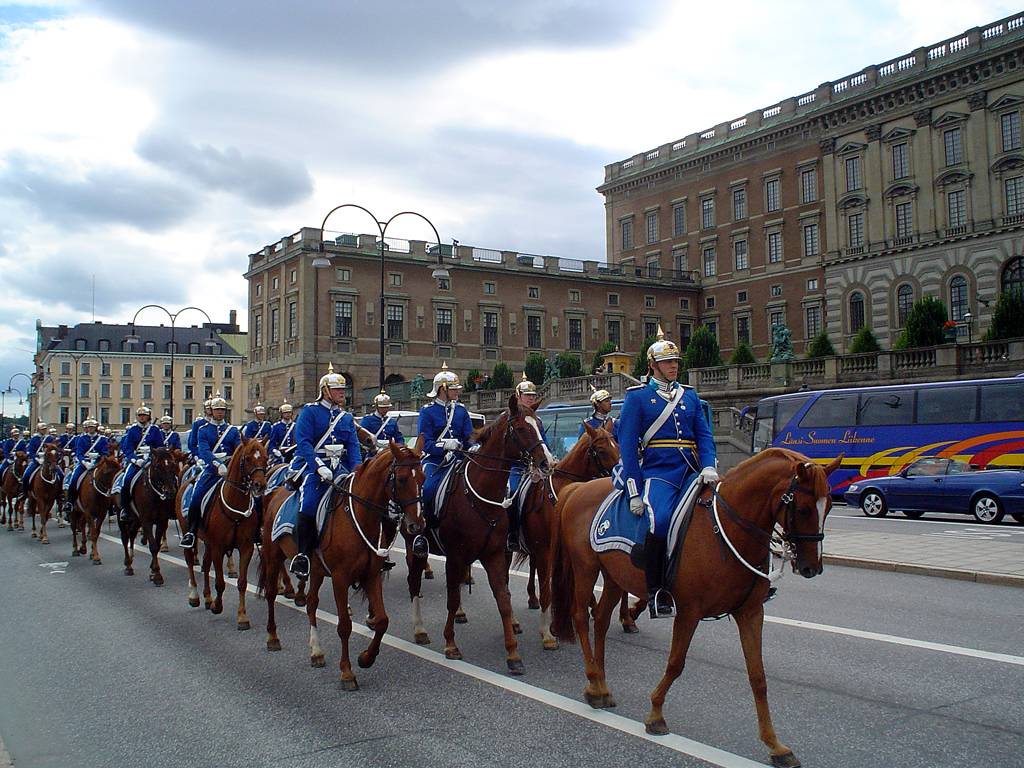
The Royal Guards

== Palace ghosts ==
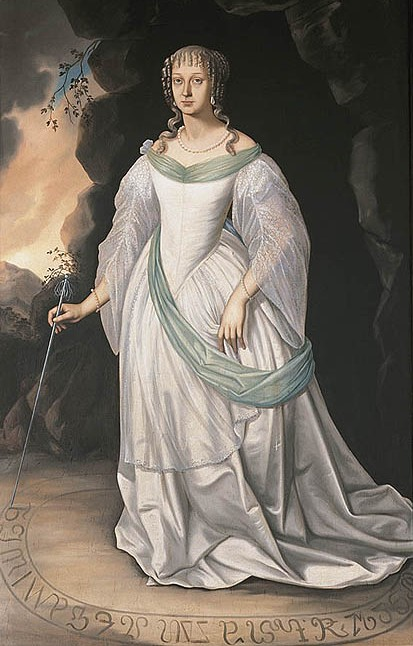
"The White Lady" is said to resemble Perchta von Rosenberg, c. 1429–1476.

There are many tales of ghosts at the palace. One of them is the Grå Gubben (the Old Grey Man) who according to tradition lives in the cellar ruins of the old Tre Kronor Castle. He is considered to be a kind of guarding spirit for the palace and he is able to predict the future. According to other legends it is no other than Birger Jarl standing guard. He is supposed to have appeared for Nicodemus Tessin the Younger, to tell him that he would not live to see the palace completed.

The most noted of the palace's ghosts is the Vita frun (the White lady). A White Lady, White woman, Weiße Frau or Dame Blanche is said to exist in many European castles and likewise in Stockholm. According to legend, the White Lady is a messenger of death for someone in the royal family. She showed up when someone was about to die. She is supposedly tall and wears a white silk dress, only the rustle of the silk is heard as she approaches. There are several theories as to who she might be and where she comes from. According to one theory she is the Duchess Agnes of Merán, a German noble lady from the House of Hohenzollern who lived in the 1200s. She was married to Count Otto of Orlamünde until he died in 1293. She murdered both her children by him to be able to marry Albrect, a Count from Nurnberg also known as The Fair, but he abandoned her. She died in prison and is since then showing herself as a white lady in the Hohenzollern castles in connection to important family events.

Other sources claim that the White Lady is Perchta von Rosenberg, daughter of Ulrich II von Rosenberg, a German noble woman from the 15th century, who unhappily married against her will to Jan of Liechtenstein. According to tradition she appears in the Český Krumlov Castle in southern Czech Republic. The portrait of her is said to be much like the descriptions of the White Lady at the palace.

Deaths of members of the royal family have occurred in connection to the appearance of the White Lady in the palace. In March 1871, Princess Eugenie saw the ghost and three days later Queen Louise died. The White Lady appeared again in 1907, and shortly after that, King Oscar II died. The last time she was seen was in 1920, when Princess Margaret lay dying. Suddenly the flag at the palace was lowered to half-mast and a guard is said to have seen the White Lady on the roof. Two hours after this the princess died.

== See also ==
- Architecture of Stockholm
- List of Baroque residences
