= Slottsarkivet =

Coordinates: 59°19′38.3″N 18°04′15.9″E

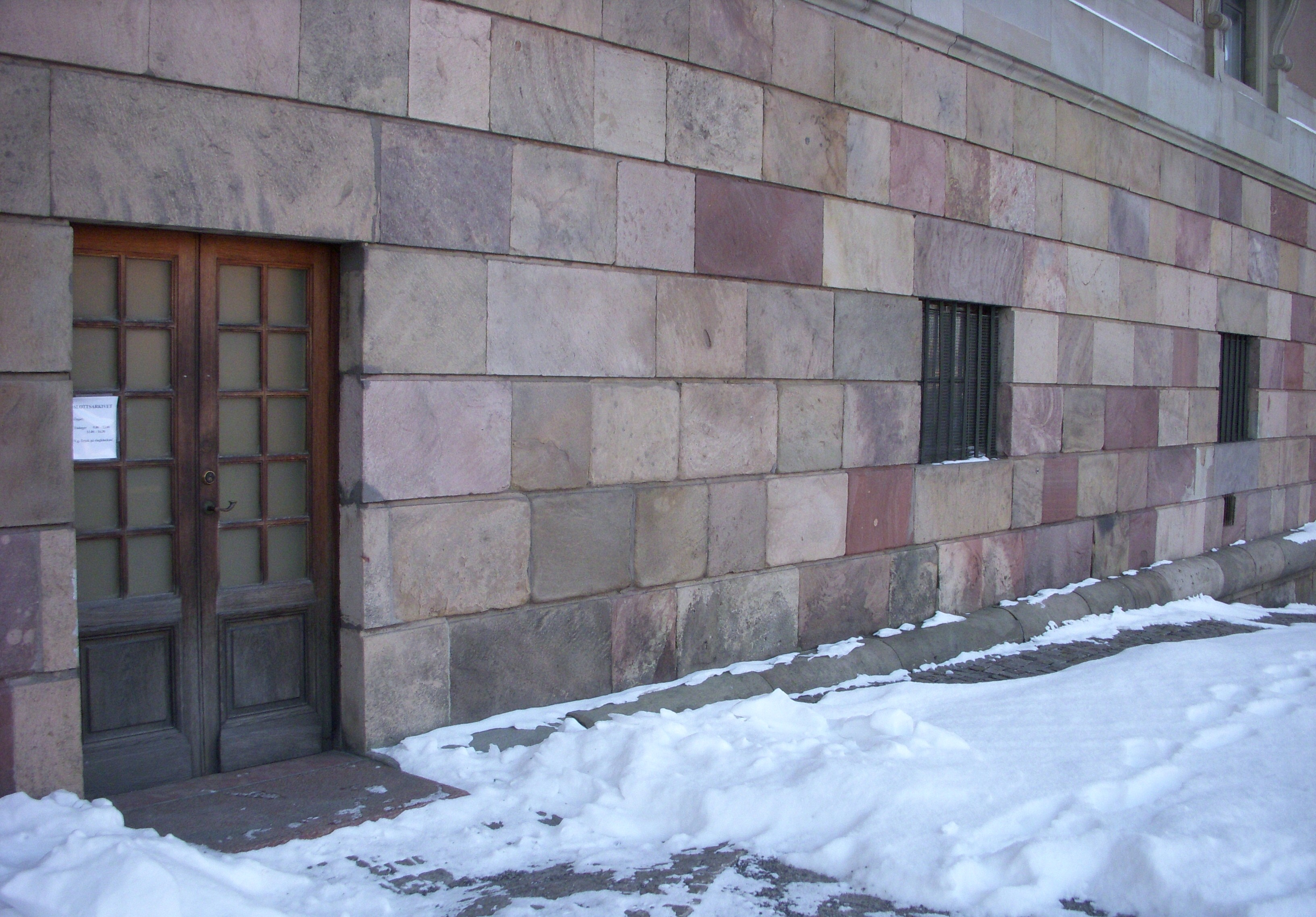
Entry to Slottsarkivet from Lejonbacken.

Slottsarkivet (the Palace Archive) is an archive at Stockholm Palace, Sweden. The archive was established in 1893, and since 1964 it is a section under the National Archives of Sweden. It houses archives from the Royal Court and the royal palaces. The archives of the kings and queens before year 1800 are situated at the National Archive at Kungsholmen, Stockholm. There is also a reference library at Slottsarkivet.

== Bernadotte Archive ==
The Bernadotte Archive is the private archive of the Swedish royal family. It contains archives of the House of Bernadotte, and is situated at Ulriksdal Palace. It is not a public archive, and the material can only be used with permission of the royal family.
