= Alexander Garden (Saint Petersburg) =

Park in St Petersburg, Russia

Coordinates: 59°56′13″N 30°18′34″E

This park should not be confused with Alexander Park in St. Petersburg and Alexander Garden in Moscow.

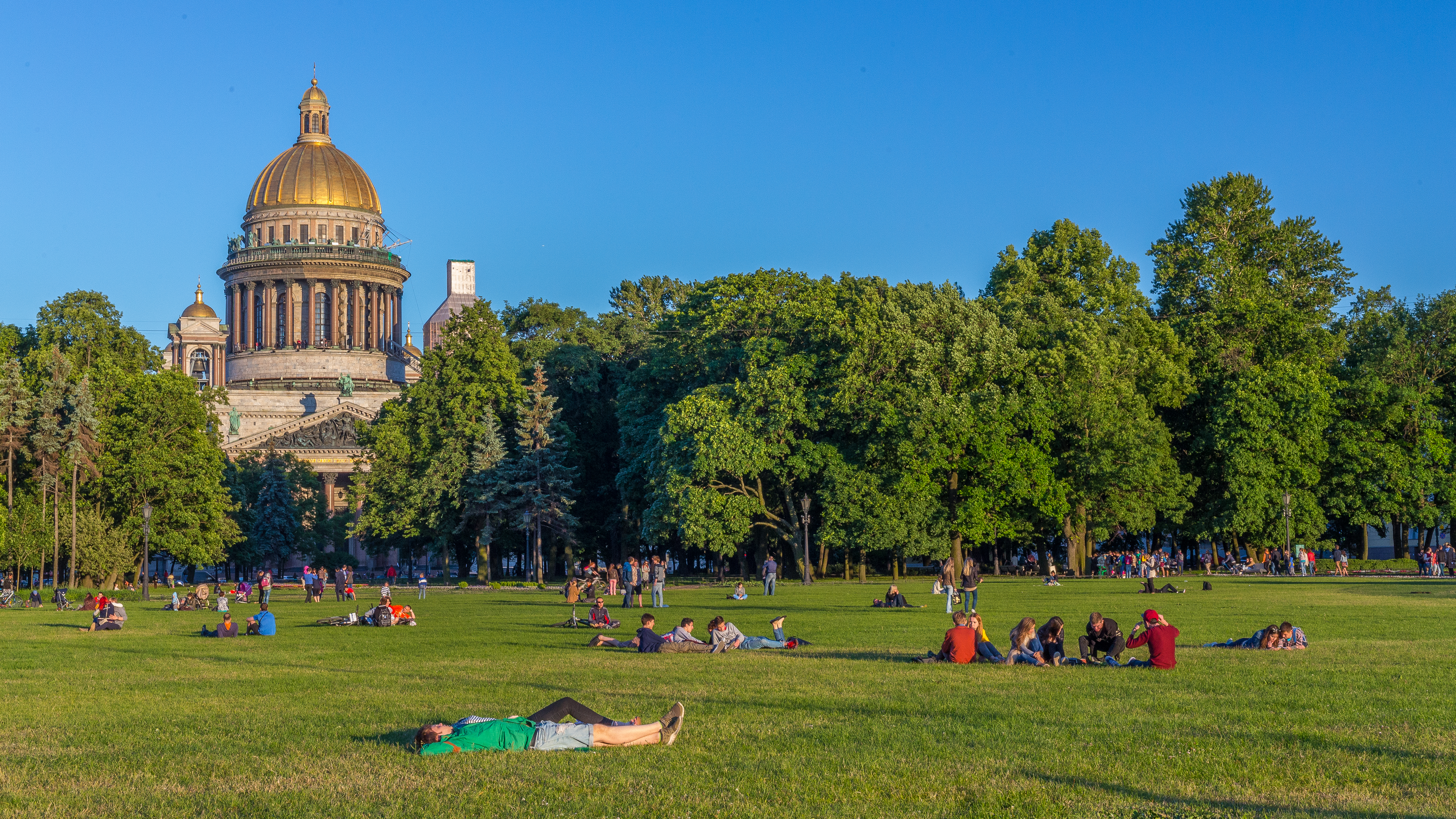

The Alexander Garden (Александровский сад) lies along the south and west façades of the Russian Admiralty in St. Petersburg, parallel to the Neva River and Admiralty Quay, extending from Palace Square in the east to St. Isaac's Cathedral in the west. The English park is named after Alexander II of Russia who ordered some 52 species of trees to be planted there. It was formerly known as the Admiralty Boulevard, the Admiralty Meadow, and the Labourers Garden.

The garden was designed by Luigi Rusca in 1805. William Gould, an English-born gardener, was hired to raze the southern ramparts of the Admiralty Fortress, replacing them with four lime-tree alleys. The moat of the fortress was filled in 1819, making room for additional lanes. The garden was a traditional place for Easter and Maslenitsa revels. Three lanes leading from the Admiralty tower to Nevsky Avenue, Voznesensky Avenue and Gorokhovaya Street were designed by Ivan Fomin in 1923. This arrangement made the Admiralty Tower the focal point of the entire downtown.

By contrast with the Summer Garden, the Alexander Garden originally had no statuary. It was not until 1833 that Paolo Triscorni's marble copies of the Farnese Hercules and Farnese Flora appeared. A fountain was installed in front of the Admiralty tower in 1879. The Nikolai Przhevalsky monument and four busts (Mikhail Glinka, by Vladimir Pashchenko, and three by Vasily Kreitan; namely Nikolai Gogol, Mikhail Lermontov and Vasily Zhukovsky) date from the 1890s. Chancellor Gorchakov's statue was added in 1998.
