= Admiralty, Saint Petersburg =

Headquarters of the Russian Navy

Coordinates: 59.937601°N 30.308576°E

Admiralty
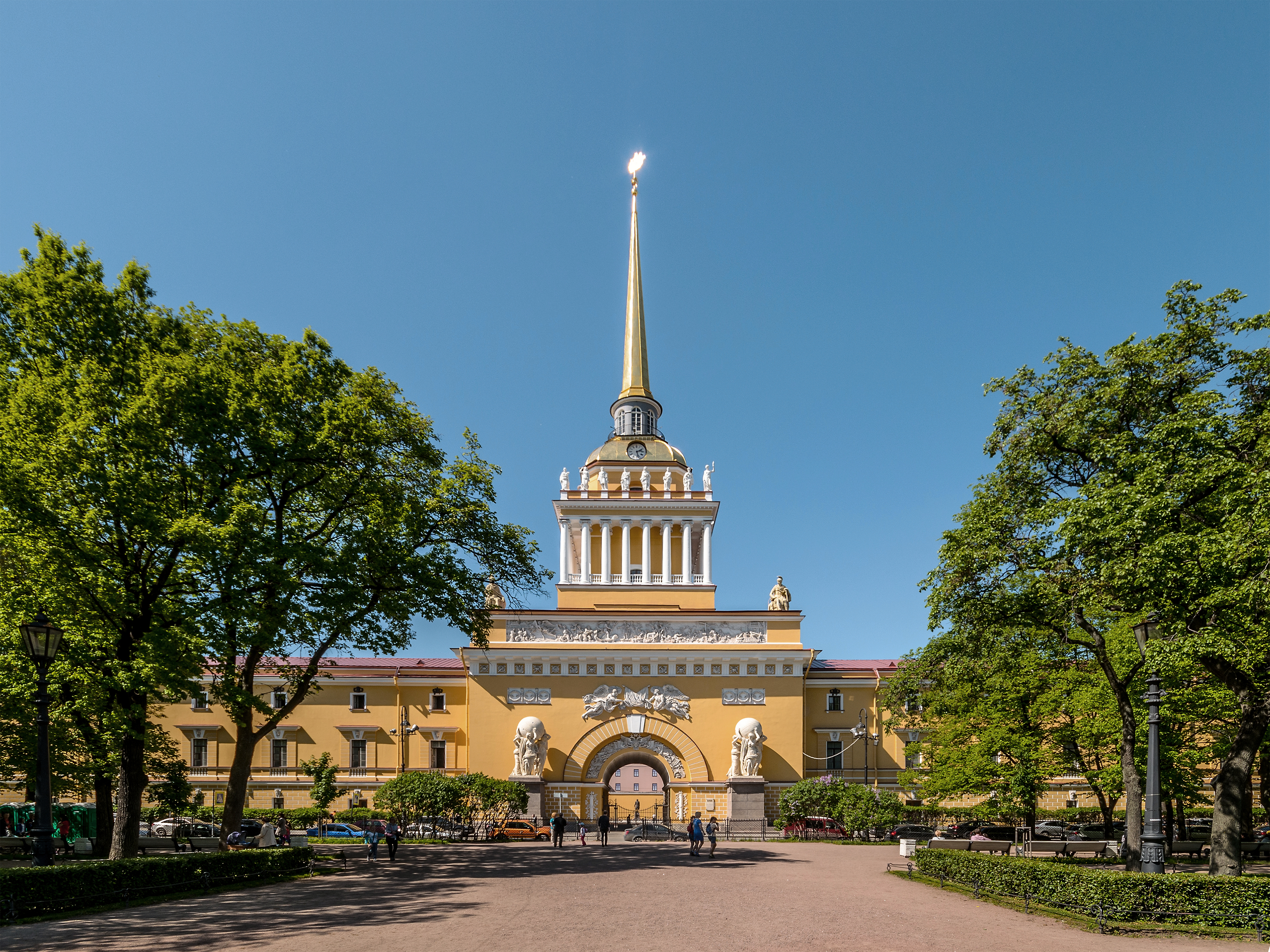
- The Admiralty building's tower as seen from the Alexander Gardens. It is the focal point of St Petersburg's historic city center and three main avenues converge nearby.
- Interactive map of the Admiralty area

General information
- Architectural style: Empire
- Construction started: 1704 (Original); 1806 (Current)
- Completed: 1706 (Original); 1823 (Current)

Design and construction
- Architects: Ivan Kuzmich Korobov (Original); Andreyan Zakharov (Current)

The Main Admiralty Building (

Russian: Зда́ние Гла́вного адмиралте́йства), is a historic building complex located in the Central Saint Petersburg area of Saint Petersburg, Russia. It is the current headquarters of the Russian Navy and the formerly the Admiralty Board of the Imperial Russian Navy. It is one of the original buildings of Saint Peterburg commissioned by Peter the Great and its spire serves as the focal point of the old city's three main streets: Nevsky Prospect, Gorokhovaya Street, and Voznesensky Avenue.

The Admiralty was originally designed as a fortified shipyard in 1704 which was later surrounded by five bastions protected by a moat. It was rebuilt between 1806 and 1823 to Andreyan Zakharov's design in the Empire Style, lining the Admiralty Embankment along the Great Neva river, demolishing the bastions to create Alexander Garden. It housed the engineering school of the Soviet Navy and Russian Navy from 1927 until it was relocated to Pushkin in 1998, and the headquarters of the Leningrad Naval Base until 2009. The Russian Navy returned its headquarters to the Admiralty building in 2012.

The Admiralty's spire topped by a golden weather-vane in the shape of a small sail warship (Korablik), designed by Dutch master builder Harmen van Bol'es, is one of Saint Petersburg's most conspicuous landmarks, underscoring the importance Peter the Great placed on Russia's navy in the city. Vladimir Nabokov, writer and native of Saint Petersburg, wrote a short story in May 1933 entitled "The Admiralty Spire."

== See also ==
- Bronze Horseman
- Lions at the Dvortsovaya pier
- Saint Isaac's Cathedral
