= Medici lions =

Pair of marble sculptures of lions

Coordinates: 43°46′9.13″N 11°15′20.37″E

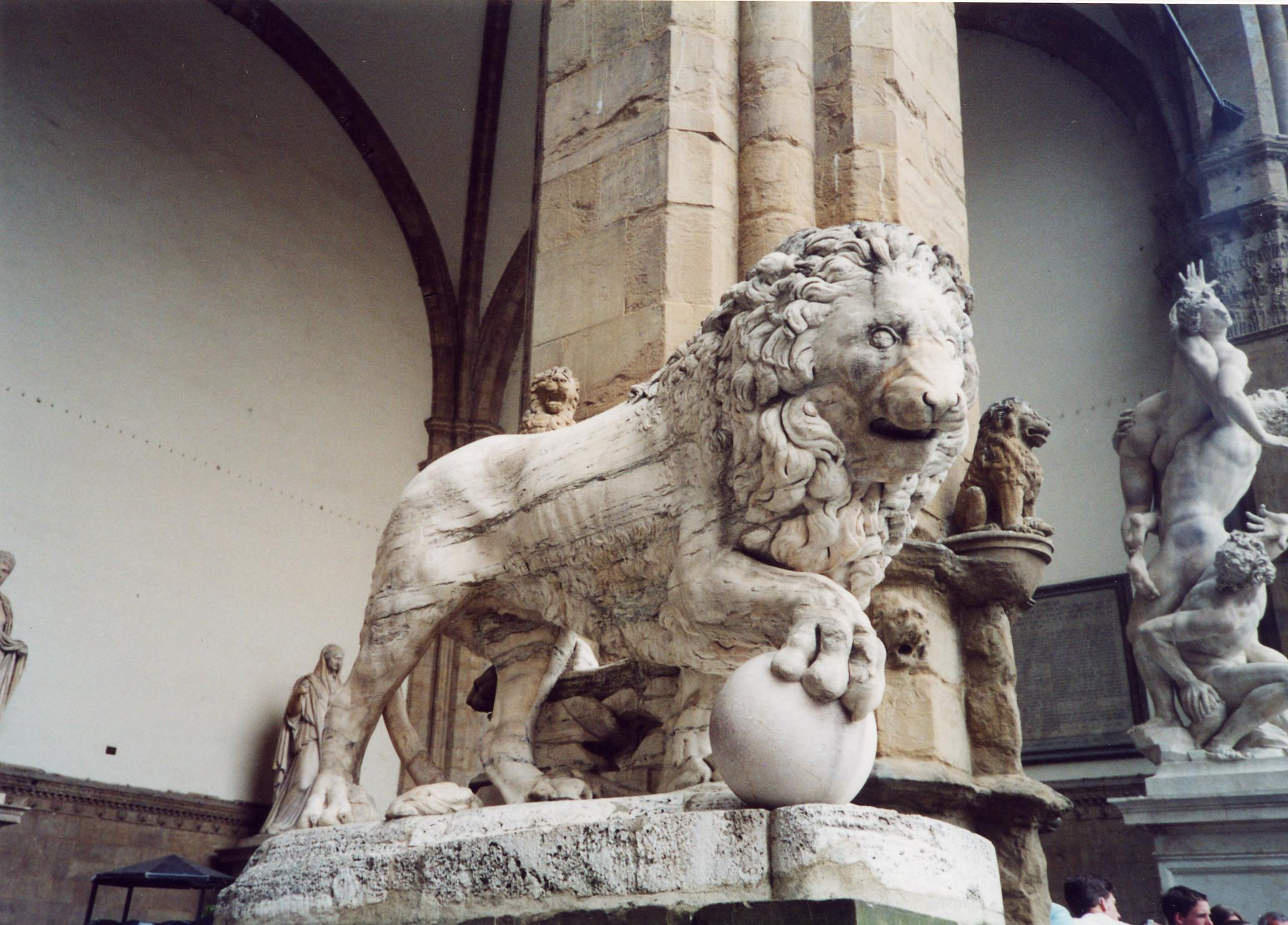
Fancelli's ancient lion

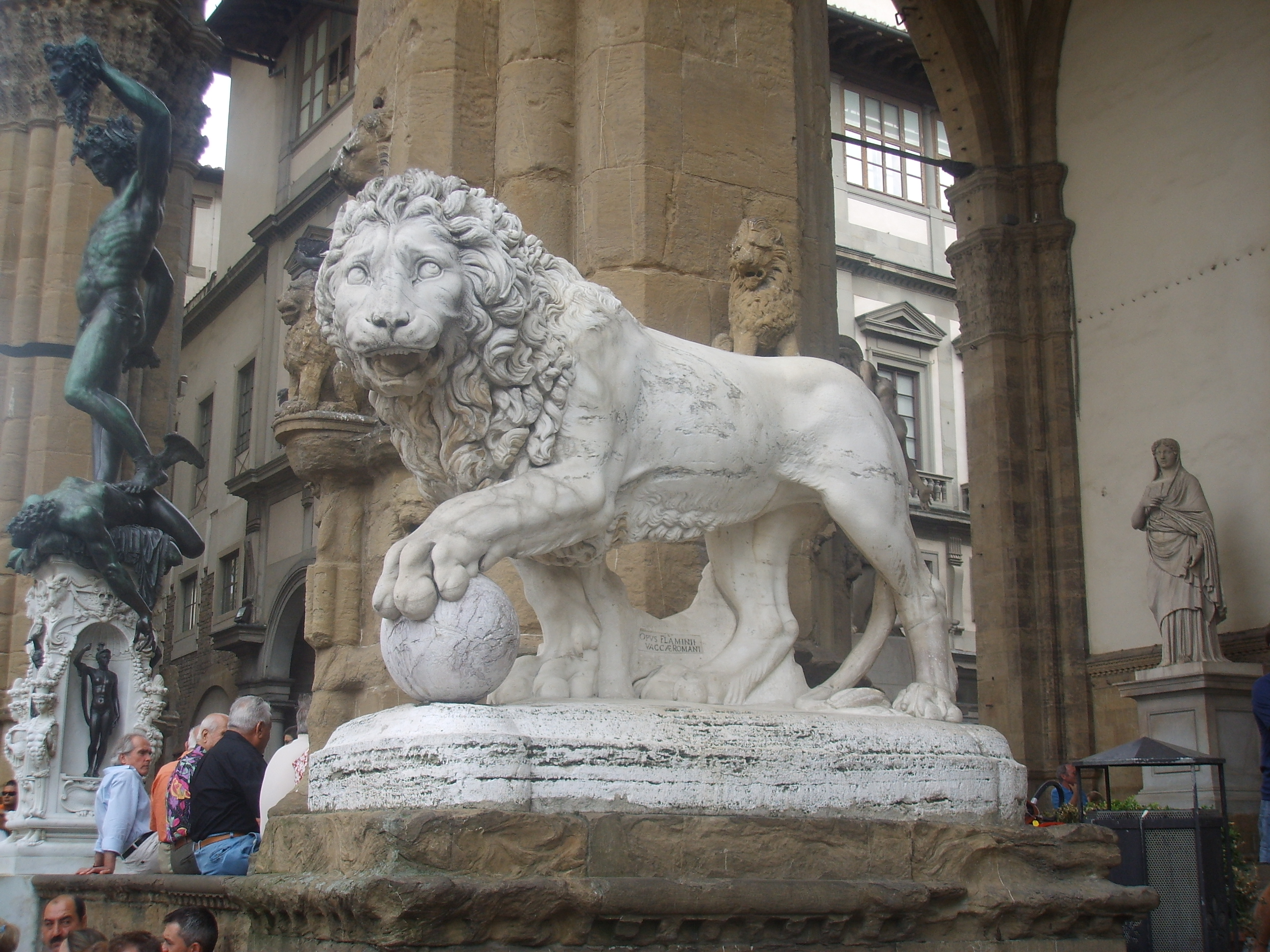
Vacca's lion

The Medici lions are a pair of marble sculptures of lions: one of which is Roman, dating to the 2nd century AD, and the other a 16th-century pendant. By 1598 both were placed at the Villa Medici, Rome. Since 1789 they have been displayed at the Loggia dei Lanzi in Florence, and have been associated with renaissance art.

The sculptures depict standing male lions with a sphere or ball under one paw, looking to the side.

Copies of the Medici lions have been made and publicly installed in over 30 other locations, and smaller versions made in a variety of media. Medici lion has become a term for this sculptural type.

A similar Roman lion sculpture, of the 1st century AD, is known as the Albani lion, and is now in the Louvre. Here, the stone used for the ball is different from the basalt body. Both may derive from a Hellenistic original.

== History ==
A pair of lions were required by Ferdinando I de' Medici, Grand Duke of Tuscany, who had acquired the Villa Medici in 1576, to serve as majestic ornaments for the villa's garden staircase, the Loggia dei leoni. The first lion originates from a 2nd-century marble that was first mentioned in 1594, by the sculptor Flaminio Vacca, by which time it was already in the collection of Ferdinando; Vacca reported that it had been found in the via Prenestina, outside Porta San Lorenzo. According to Vacca, the lion had been a relief, which was carved free of its background and reworked by "Giovanni Sciarano" or Giovanni di Scherano Fancelli, of whom little is now known.

The second was made and signed by Vacca, also in marble, as a pendant to the ancient sculpture at a date variously reported as between 1594 and 1598 or between 1570 and 1590. The pair were in place at the Loggia dei Leoni in 1598 The pendant was made from a capital that had come from the Temple of Jupiter Optimus Maximus.

The Villa Medici was inherited by the house of Lorraine in 1737, and in 1787 the lions were moved to Florence, and since 1789 they flank the steps to the Loggia dei Lanzi at the Piazza della Signoria.

The sculptures were replaced by copies at the Villa Medici when Napoleon relocated the French Academy in Rome to the villa in 1803. These copies were made by the French sculptor Augustin Pajou.

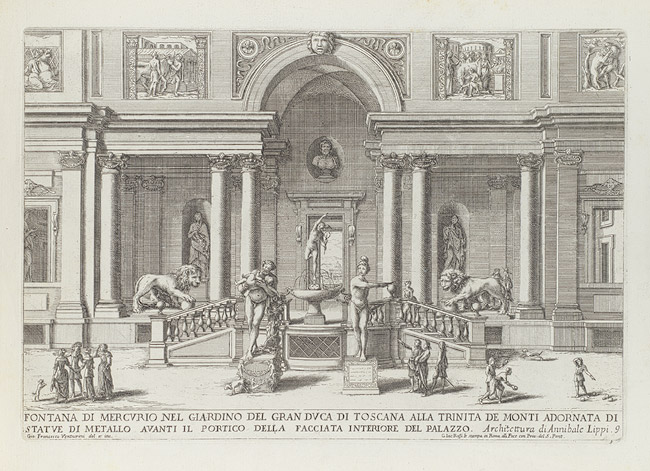
The original Medici lions at the Villa Medici (Giovanni Francesco Venturini 1691)

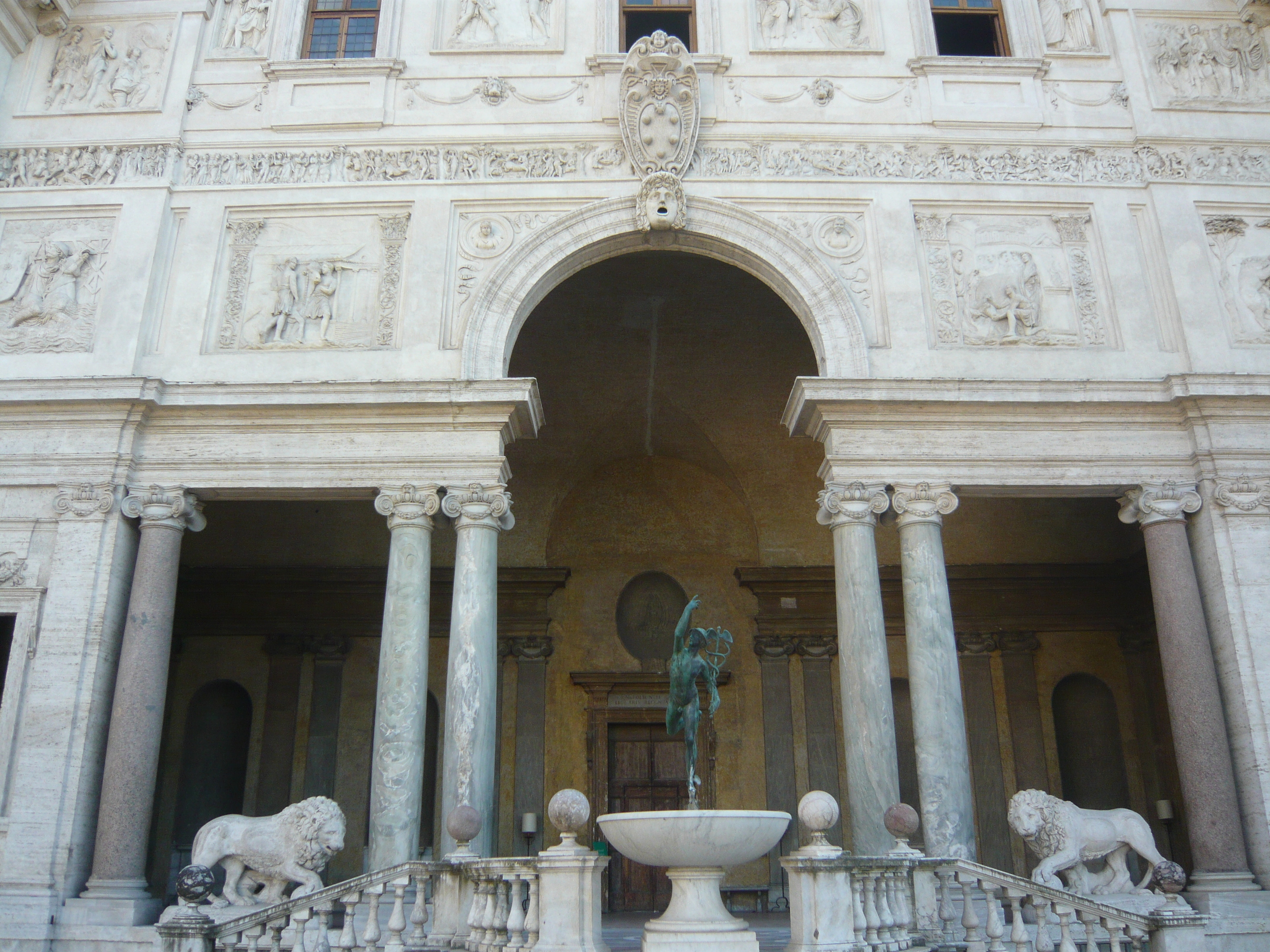
The current Medici Lions at the Villa Medici in Rome

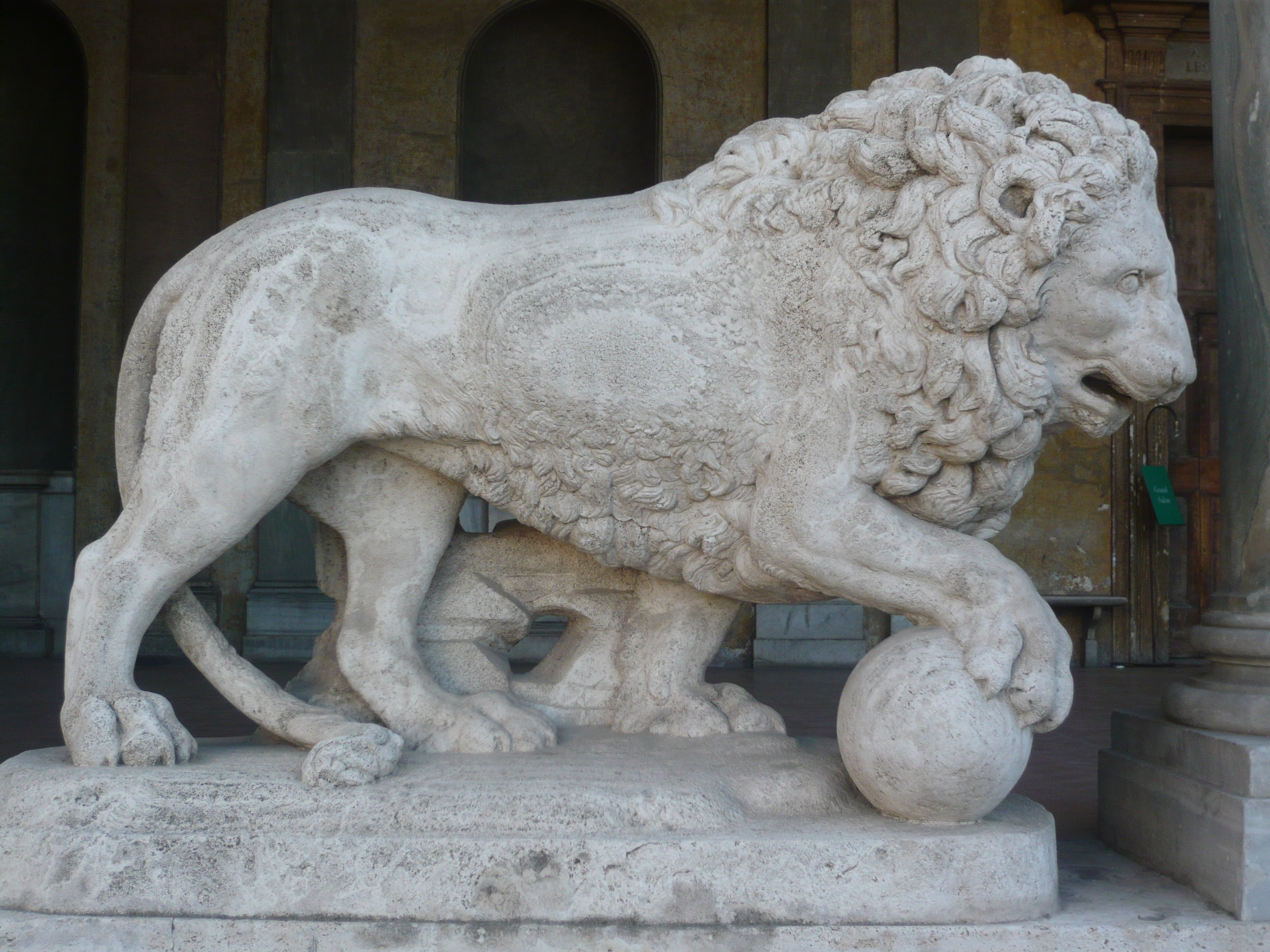
Medici Lion by Augustin Pajou at the Villa Medici

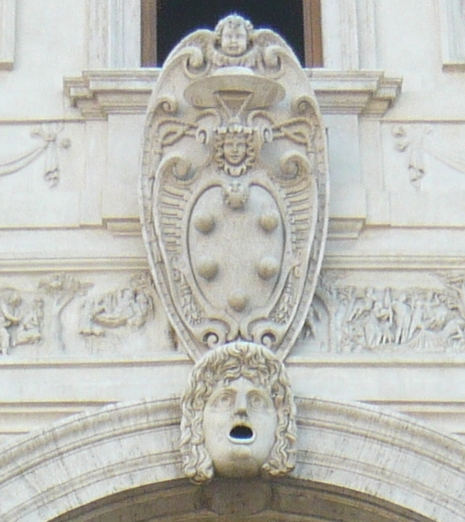
The Medici coat of arms with five balls, above Loggia dei leoni

== Copies ==
The original Medici lions (1598) have since 1789 stood in the Loggia dei Lanzi, Piazza della Signoria, Florence. There is a smaller bronze left-looking sculpture attributed to Italian sculptor Pietro da Barga and the same period. Later copies or replicas include (ordered by first year):

=== Spain ===
The four of Bonuccelli's Medici lions now in the Royal Palace of Madrid Throne Room

- Twelve sculptures in bronze by Matteo Bonuccelli da Lucca, commissioned in Rome by Velázquez for the Room of Mirrors at the Royal Alcazar of Madrid (1651):
  - Four sculptures are now in the throne room in the Royal Palace of Madrid (since 1764).
  - Eight sculptures are now in the Museo del Prado, of which four support the tabletop of Rodrigo Calderón.
- Sculptures in Colmenar marble at the Montforte Gardens, Valencia by José Bellver (circa 1860).
- Sculptures in marble at the Canalejas Park, Alicante (park created 1886).

=== Sweden ===
- Sculptures in bronze, (close imitations, Slottslejonen) at the Royal castle, Stockholm, 1702 and 1704.
- Sculpture in bronze in the Royal Swedish Academy of Arts building, Stockholm (before 1735?).
- Sculpture in bronze at the Royal Institute of Art, Stockholm (1995).
- Sculpture in bronze in Nacka, Stockholm (1996).

=== Great Britain ===
One of the Stowe House Medici lions

- Sculptures in lead at Stowe House attributed to John Cheere (around 1755–1779). Formerly placed at Stanley Park, Blackpool (1927–2013).
- Sculpture in portland stone by Joseph Wilton in the gardens of Kedleston Hall, Derbyshire (commissioned 1759, installed c. 1766).
- Two artificial stone versions are found in the garden of Osborne House (1845–1851), Isle of Wight.
- Sculptures at the Stanley Park, Blackpool (2013). (Note: These were produced, by Rupert Harris Conservation, using casts from the former sculptures which were returned, on loan, to Stowe house in 2013.)

=== Russia ===
- The Lion Cascade in bronze at Peterhof Palace, Saint Petersburg (1799–1801).
- Sculptures in marble at the Lobanov-Rostovsky Residence, Saint Petersburg (constructed 1817–20).
- Two pairs of stone lion sculptures at the Maryino Estate, Leningrad Oblast (installed by 1821).
- Sculptures in bronze at the staircase of the Mikhailovsky Palace, Saint Petersburg (constructed 1819–25).
- Sculptures at the entrance of Yelagin Palace, Saint Petersburg (completed 1822).
- Pair of cast-iron sculptures in the Novgorod Kremlin, Veliky Novgorod (1824). Originally installed at the Gruzino estate of Count Aleksey Arakcheyev.
- The Lions at the Dvortsovaya pier in bronze at the Admiralty embankment, Saint Petersburg (1832).
- Sculptures at the pier on the western point of Yelagin Island, Saint Petersburg (1926).

=== Italy ===
- Sculptures in marble by Augustin Pajou at the Villa Medici (1803).
- Sculptures (plaster casts) at the Liceo artistico statale di Porta Romana, Florence. (Note: The Istituto d'Arte di Porta Romana also produced plaster replicas for the decorations erected outside Firenze Santa Maria Novella railway station during Adolf Hitler's visit to Florence on 9 May 1938. Sixteen lions were arranged along the base of a large temporary grandstand.)

=== Germany ===
- Pair of sandstone sculptures at the entrance of Schloss Monrepos, Ludwigsburg (1803–1804), designed by Antonio Isopi and executed by sculptors Mack and Friedrich.
- Four miniature sculptures surrounding the Akademie- or Löwenbrunnen in the palace garden, Stuttgart (1807–1811).
- Two gilded bronze sculptures by Christian Daniel Rauch, designed by Karl Friedrich Schinkel at the Löwenfontäne (Lion Fountain) in front of Glienicke Palace, Berlin (1837–1838).

=== France ===
- Pair of marble sculptures at the Château de Compiègne, France (1785–1800). Originally installed at the Tuileries Palace in Paris in 1796, they were transferred to Compiègne in 1872.
- Marble sculptures in the Parc de Saint-Cloud, Hauts-de-Seine, Paris (1802-1806). (Note: One pair of marble sculptures at the Bassin des Vingt-Quatre Jets, and at least three sculptures at the Bassin de la Petite Gerbe, Terrasse des Orangers.)

=== Ukraine ===
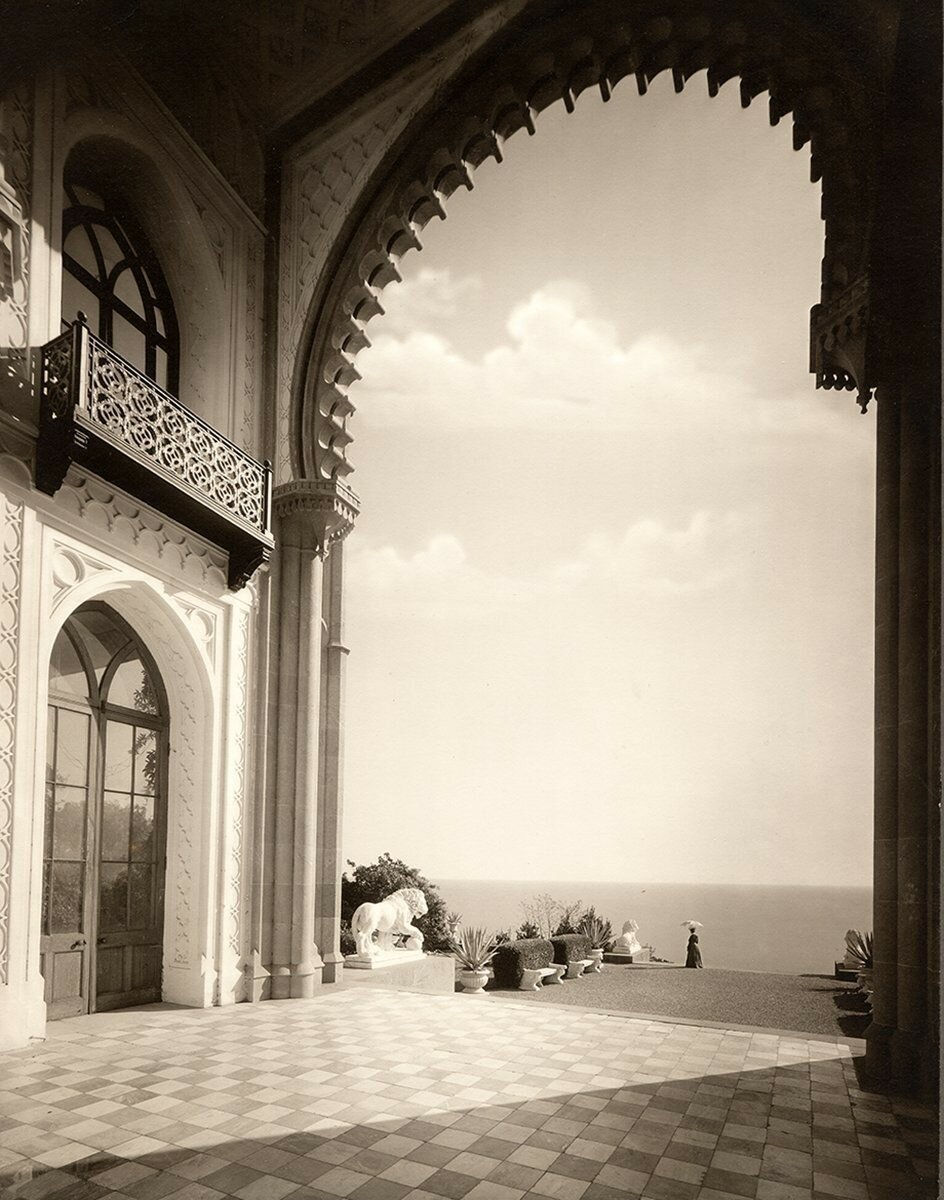
One of the Medici lions at the Vorontsov Palace, Crimea, ca 1900

- Sculptures in marble at the Vorontsov Palace, Odessa (completed 1830, then part of Novorossiya).
- One pair of marble lion sculptures at the Voronstov Palace, Crimea (installed in 1848, then part of Novorossiya).
- Pair of lion sculptures by Giuseppe Mormone at Starosennaya Square, Odessa (created 1891-1896, then part of Novorossiya).
- Lion sculpture at the National University of Life and Environmental Sciences of Ukraine Botanical Garden, Kyiv (unknown year).

=== Cuba ===
- Two versions outside the Cathedral de la Purisma Concepción in Cienfuegos (built 1833–69), Cuba.

=== United States ===
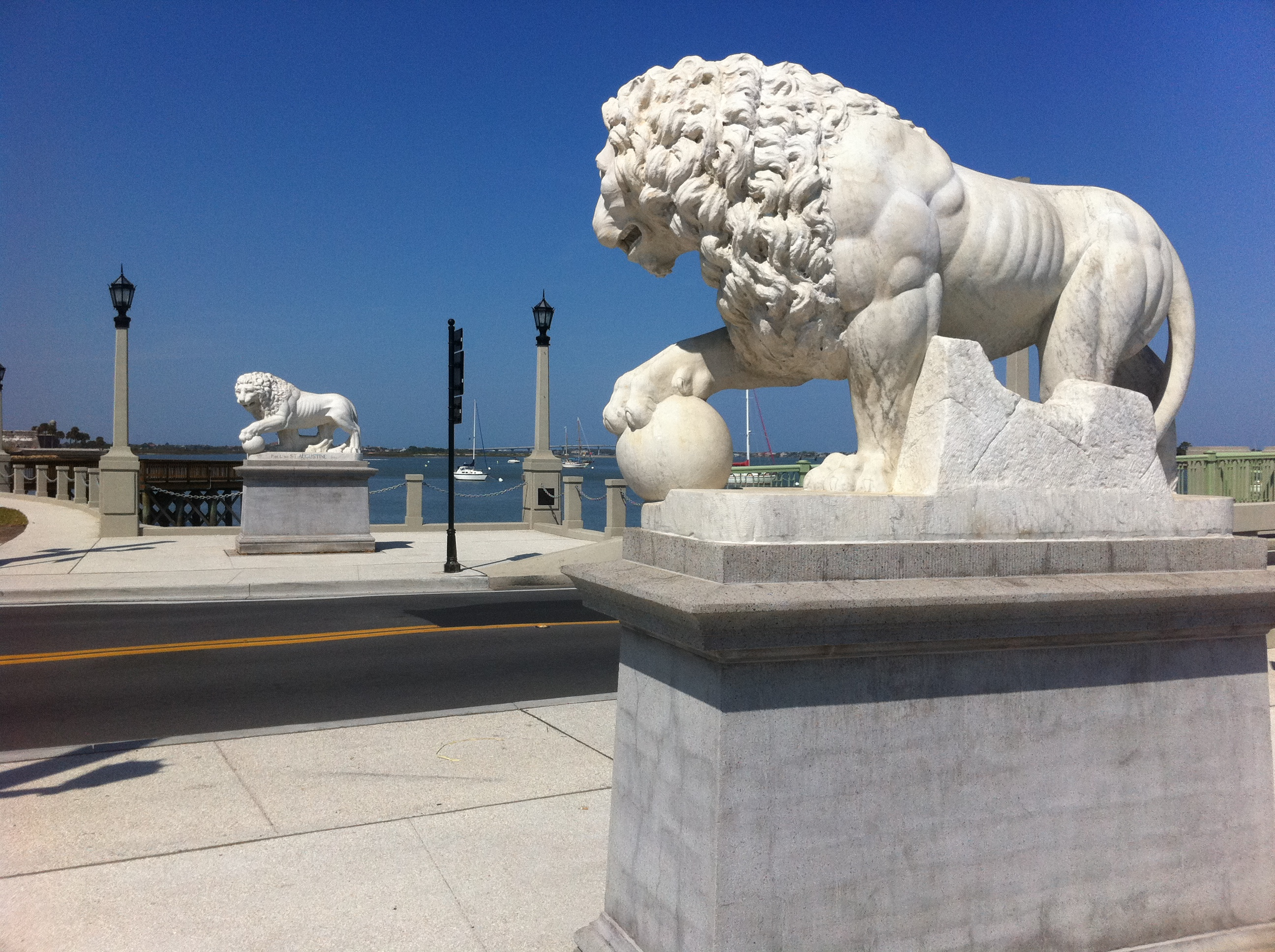
The Medici lions at the western end of the Bridge of Lions in St Augustine, Florida

- The Florentine Lions in cast-iron in the Fairmount Park, Philadelphia (cast in 1849 at the Alexandroffsky Head Mechanical Works, St Petersburg, Russia for Andrew M. Eastwick, originally displayed at Bartram's Garden, 1851–1879, installed at west Fairmount Park in 1887).
- Medici Lions, at Bowdoin College Museum of Art, Bowdoin College, Maine. (Note: The Museum’s landmark Walker Art Building was commissioned for the College by Harriet and Sophia Walker in honor of their uncle, a Boston businessman who had supported the creation of the first small art gallery at Bowdoin in the mid-nineteenth century. Designed by Charles Follen McKim of McKim, Mead, & White, the building was completed in 1894 and is on the National Register of Historic Places.)
- Stone sculptures, Mick and Mack, at McMicken Hall, The University of Cincinnati, Ohio (there since 1904). (Note: The pair of lions originally belonged to Jacob Hoffner, a wealthy Cincinnati landowner who bequeathed them to the University upon his death in 1891. They were transported to their current location in 1904.)
- The pair of lions on the western end of the eponymous Bridge of Lions in St. Augustine, Florida (constructed 1925–1927, rebuilt 2011–2012).
- Sculpture in limestone at the Museum of Outdoor Arts, Colorado (founded 1981).

=== India ===
- Four statues at the Fitzgerald Bridge in Pune (1866).

=== Estonia ===
- The Swedish lion in bronze in Narva, Estonia. A version of one of the Slottslejonen was first erected in 1936 but destroyed 1944 during the battle of Narva of the Second World War. A sized-down copy of the Medici Lion in the Royal Swedish Academy of Arts was re-erected in 2000.

=== Lithuania ===
- Sculptures of lions in bronze at the staircase of the Vytautas the Great War Museum in Kaunas, Lithuania (Note: They were donated by Lithuanian count Jonas Jurgis Tiškevičius (1917–1987) in 1938 from his Astravas Manor in Biržai suburb (decorative sculptures of lions that stood at the entrance to the manor were replaced with copies). Sculptures was made in Saint Petersburg's factory commissioned by Lithuanian count Jonas Tiškevčius in the middle of the 19th century.)
- Sculptures of lions at the Astravas Manor

=== Hungary ===
- Statues at Pétervására, Hungary (early 1900s).

== Close imitations ==
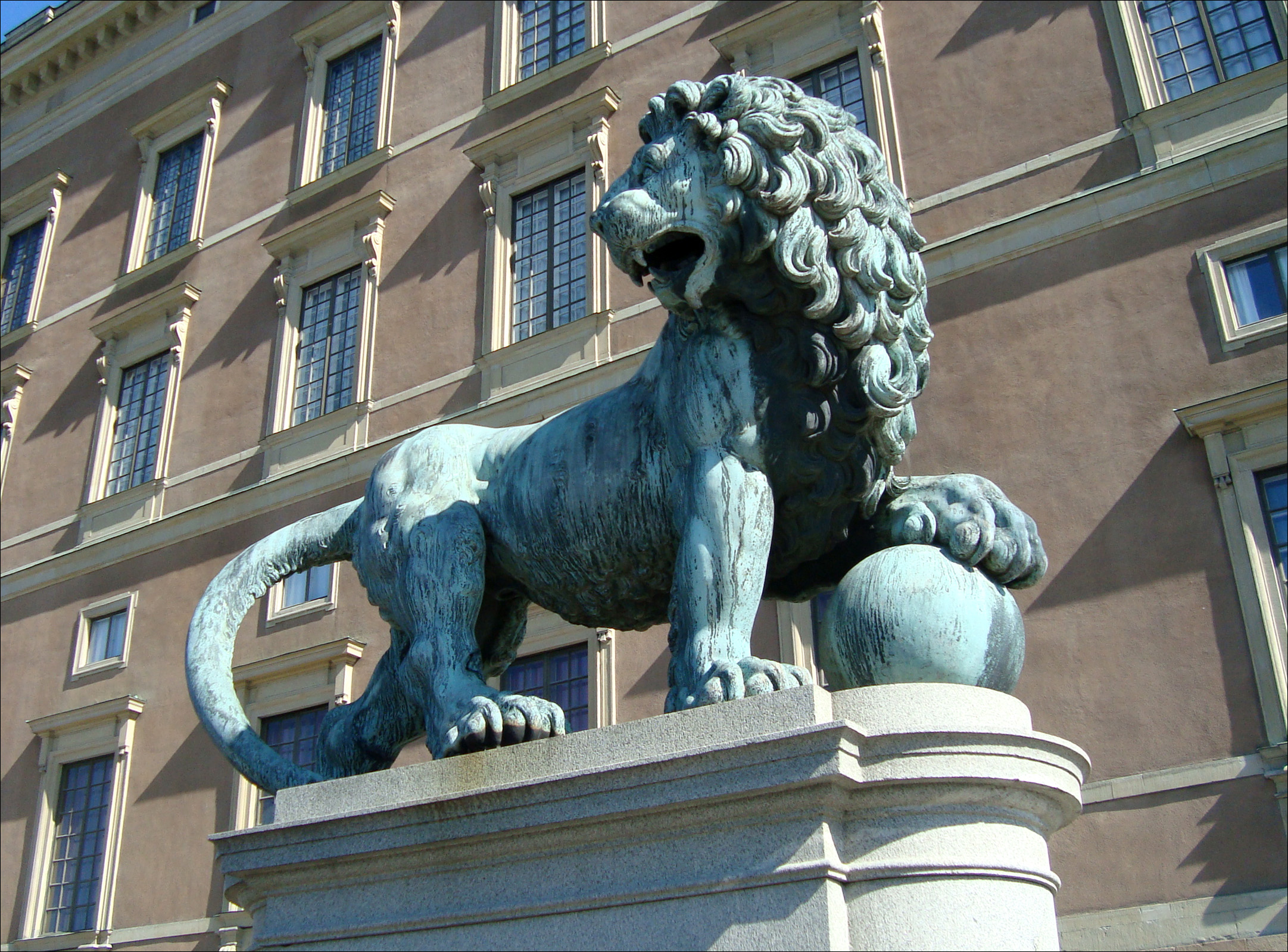
Slottslejonen at the Royal Palace, Stockholm

- Sweden: Slottslejonen (Swedish for The Palace Lions) in bronze, by Bernard Foucquet at the Royal Palace, Stockholm (1700–1704).
- United Kingdom: Sculptures in bronze at the Queen's Gate entrance to Royal Victoria Park in Bath (1818–1819). (Note: Renovated in 2007 to include the ball under the paw. Produced around 1818, they were commissioned by Charles Geary Esq, for inclusion in the new Masonic Hall in York Street, Bath, which was opened on 23 September 1819 with great ceremony, by the Grand Master of England, HEH the Duke of Sussex, attended by 800 to 1000 Freemasons in full regalia. 'The Historic Guide to Bath 1864' records the event and details "the master's chair stood on a throne of black and white marble, supported by lions, their feet resting on balls." The elaborate building immediately ran into financial trouble and soon closed. In 1842, Geary, having secured the debts and in order to pay them off, sold the hall to the Society of Friends, in whose care it remains, and the elaborate contents (known as 'The Bath Furniture') to Loyal Lodge No 251, Barnstable, Devon, where they also remain to this day. The lions, however, did not make the trip, legend suggesting there was no cart available to transport them. They were, therefore, presented to the city and the same 'The Historic Guide to Bath 1864' later records "At the side entrances, over the Queen's Gate, leading to the Royal Avenue are Bronzed Lions, presented by Mr. Geary." They were restored in 2007.)
- Belgium: Lion of Waterloo in iron, by Jean-François Van Geel in Waterloo (1826).
- Spain: The Leones del Congreso: Daoiz y Velarde in bronze at the Congress of Deputies, Madrid, Cast in 1865, installed 1872.
- Finland: Parolan Leijona (Finnish for The Lion of Parola) on a four-meter-high (13 ft) pedestal in Hattula. Erected in 1868 to commemorate the 1863 visit by Alexander II of Russia.
- Barbados: The Lion at Gun Hill carved from a single piece of coral stone in 1868 by Captain Henry John Wilkinson, who was stationed there. It is situated southeast and below the Gun Hill Signal Station, overlooking the St. George Valley.
- Germany: The lions of the Feldherrnhalle in the Odeonsplatz in Munich are a work of Wilhelm von Rümann, added in 1906 in imitation of the Medici lions of the Loggia dei Lanzi.

== In culture ==
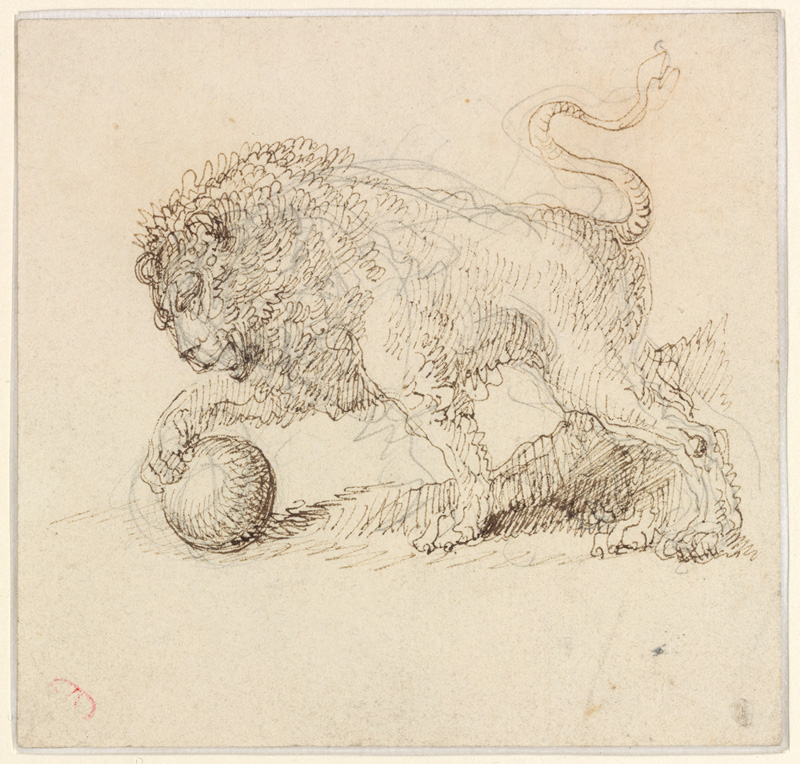
Study of one of the Medici Lions by Giuseppe Bernardino Bison (1762–1844)

Artworks featuring the Medici lions include Charles II as Grandmaster of the Golden Fleece by Juan Carreño de Miranda (1676), The Villa Medici and garden in Rome by Caspar van Wittel (1685), Fontana di Mercurio nel Giardino del Gran Duca di Toscana by Giovanni Giacomo de Rossi (1691), Modern Rome by Giovanni Paolo Panini (1758), The Child Canova Modeling a Lion out of Butter by Pinckney Marcius-Simons (1885), and The Throne Room, Royal Palace of Madrid by William Bruce Ellis Ranken (1927).

Medici Lions have appeared, often downsized and sometimes anachronistically, in films including The Plague of Florence (1919), The Black Shield of Falworth (1954), It Happened in Rome (1957), The Godfather (1972, in the garden of the Corleone family estate), History of the World, Part I (1981), and The Concert (2009).

== See also ==
- Marzocco (the heraldic symbol of Florence)
- The Albani lion (the 1st century Roman lion with a sphere)
- Cultural depictions of lions
- Chinese guardian lions
- The Child Canova Modeling a Lion out of Butter
