= Flaminio Vacca =

Italian sculptor

- Born: 1538; Rome, Papal States
- Died: 26 October 1605 (aged 66–67); Rome, Papal States
- Known for: Sculpture; Archaeology
- Notable work: Medici lions
- Movement: Late Renaissance

Flaminio Vacca or Vacchi (Rome, 1538 – Rome, 26 October 1605) was an Italian sculptor and archaeologist.

== Biography ==
=== Early life and education ===
Flaminio Vacca was born in Rome, in 1538 to a family of Spanish descent. He studied with the Florentine Vincenzo de' Rossi, who was in Rome between 1546 and 1560, and at first worked on restorations and adaptations of antique sculptures. Around 1572, he was listed among the members of the Congregazione dei Virtuosi al Pantheon.

=== Career ===
His period of greatest creative productivity began in the last years of the pontificate of Pope Gregory XIII. In 1583, he carved the Pope’s coat of arms in the two large marble escutcheons for the Collegio del Gesù, the rich curves of which are meticulously carved in the Florentine style of Bartolomeo Ammannati. In 1587–8, he worked with Pietro Paolo Olivieri to complete an Angel and a low relief of Joshua and his Army for the Acqua Felice fountain, the latter work showing his interest in late Roman reliefs..

The two sculptors, together with Domenico Fontana and Leonardo Sormani, also took part in the restoration (1588–90) of Castor and Pollux in the Monte Cavallo Fountain in Piazza del Quirinale. During this period, Vacca also sent a tabernacle (1589) to the church of San Lorenzo in Spello, outside Rome. In 1588, Vacca produced one of his most demanding works, the St. Francis of Assisi, for the Sistine Chapel in Santa Maria Maggiore, Rome. This work reveals a Mannerist taste, together with a certain stylized expressionism in the manner of de’ Rossi. In contrast, the signed figures of St. John the Baptist and St. John the Evangelist (1592–3) in Santa Maria in Vallicella (or Chiesa Nuova) display a soft, shadowy quality, modifying the Mannerist style that Vacca had learnt both from his teacher and from Baccio Bandinelli. On the other hand, the Angel in the Cappella degli Angeli in the Church of the Gesù, which dates from the end of the decade, is characterized by a freedom of modelling and an elegance of line; another Angel in the same chapel was begun by Olivieri and completed by Vacca.

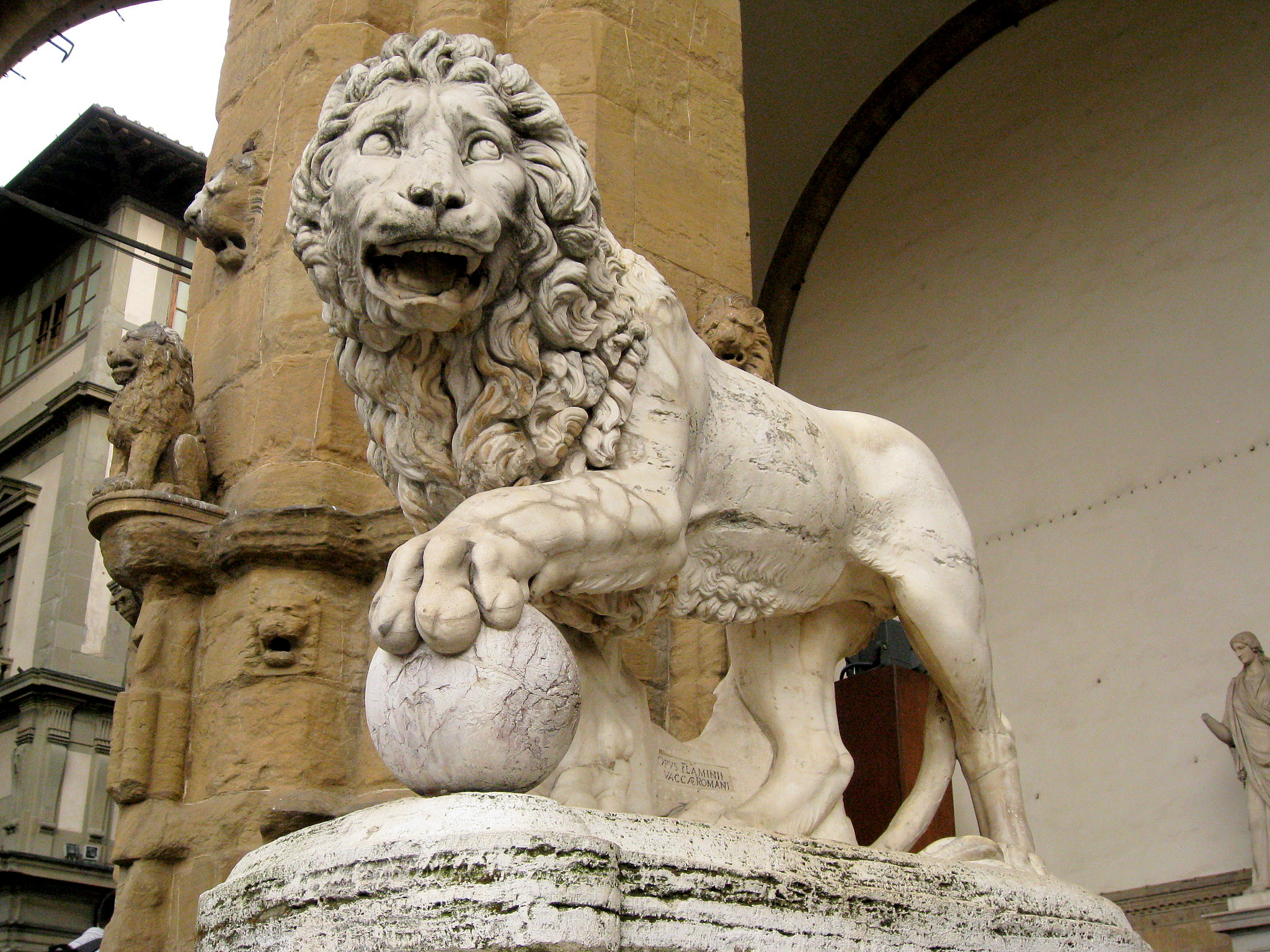
Vacca's Lion, Loggia dei Lanzi, Florence

Vacca also executed one of the two marble Medici lions (between 1570 and 1590; now Florence, Loggia dei Lanzi), commissioned by Grand Duke Ferdinando I for the Villa Medici in Rome; it was moved to Florence in 1787. It is a finely made statue that shows a return to the classical mode, a work of great vitality and virtuoso realism.

Vacca also produced highly admired portraits, with a concern for accuracy in physiognomy and psychology. His Self-portrait (signed and dated 1599; formerly Rome, Pantheon; now Rome, Protomoteca Capitolina) is modelled with great sensitivity to the play of light, revealing an expression of contained anxiety and a rigorous simplicity. The same characteristics appear in the bust of Baldassare Ginanni (c. 1599; Rome, Sant'Agostino), which has been attributed to Vacca. In 1599 he was elected head of the Accademia di San Luca in Rome.

=== Archaeology ===
Vacca’s passion for antiquity found expression in his Memorie di varie antichità trovate in diversi luoghi della città di Roma, written in 1594 and published in 1704 as an appendix to Famiano Nardini's Roma Antica. These notes are a primary source of information for the history of archaeology in the late-sixteenth century Rome.
