= Luigi Rusca =

Swiss architect in Russia

- Born: 1762; Ticino, Switzerland
- Died: 1822 (aged 59–60); Valenza, Italy
- Education: Apprenticeship with Georg Veldten and Giacomo Quarenghi
- Known for: Architect-active in Saint Petersburg (1790-1818)
- Style: Neo-classical

Luigi Rusca (Алоизий Иванович Руска; 1762–1822) was a Neoclassical architect from Ticino who worked in the Russian Empire between 1783 and 1818.

== Life and career ==
Rusca was apprenticed to Georg Veldten and Giacomo Quarenghi, then went on to a successful career on his own. In 1783 he arrived in St. Petersburg, worked as a master mason to Yury Felten, Vincenzo Brenna and Giacomo Quarenghi and by 1790, had set up as an independent architect. By 1802, he had been appointed to the position of court architect. Rusca's arrival in Saint Petersburg coincided with a period of great demand for Roccoco and Neoclassical designs with a Western aesthetic. Rusca's time in Saint Petersburg was very productive as he worked on more than 50 buildings throughout Russia and Ukraine.

In around 1833, while Rusca's team were working in Saint Petersburg, they employed a young Swiss-Italian architect, Gaspari Fossati, also from Ticino, who in 1837, married Rusca's daughter. Gaspare was subsequently appointed as the court architect in Istanbul. He recruited Rusca's son, (Gaspari's brother-in-law), Alessandro Rusca, along with Gaspari's own younger brother to become part of his team. They set sail from Odessa, arriving in Constantinople on 20 March, 1837 where they would remain for just over 20 years, and would enjoy a distinguished career.

In 1818, at the time he decided to leave Russia, Rusca was living at Nevsky Prospekt, 26, Saint Petersburg. After leaving Saint Petersburg, Rusca and family and returned to Switzerland, leaving his wife's nephew, Louis-Henri Charlemagne-Baudet called "Ludwig" (russ.: Людвиг (Людовик) Иванович Шарлемань-Боде), to supervise the completion of his buildings. He died 1822 in Valenza (Italy).

== Work ==
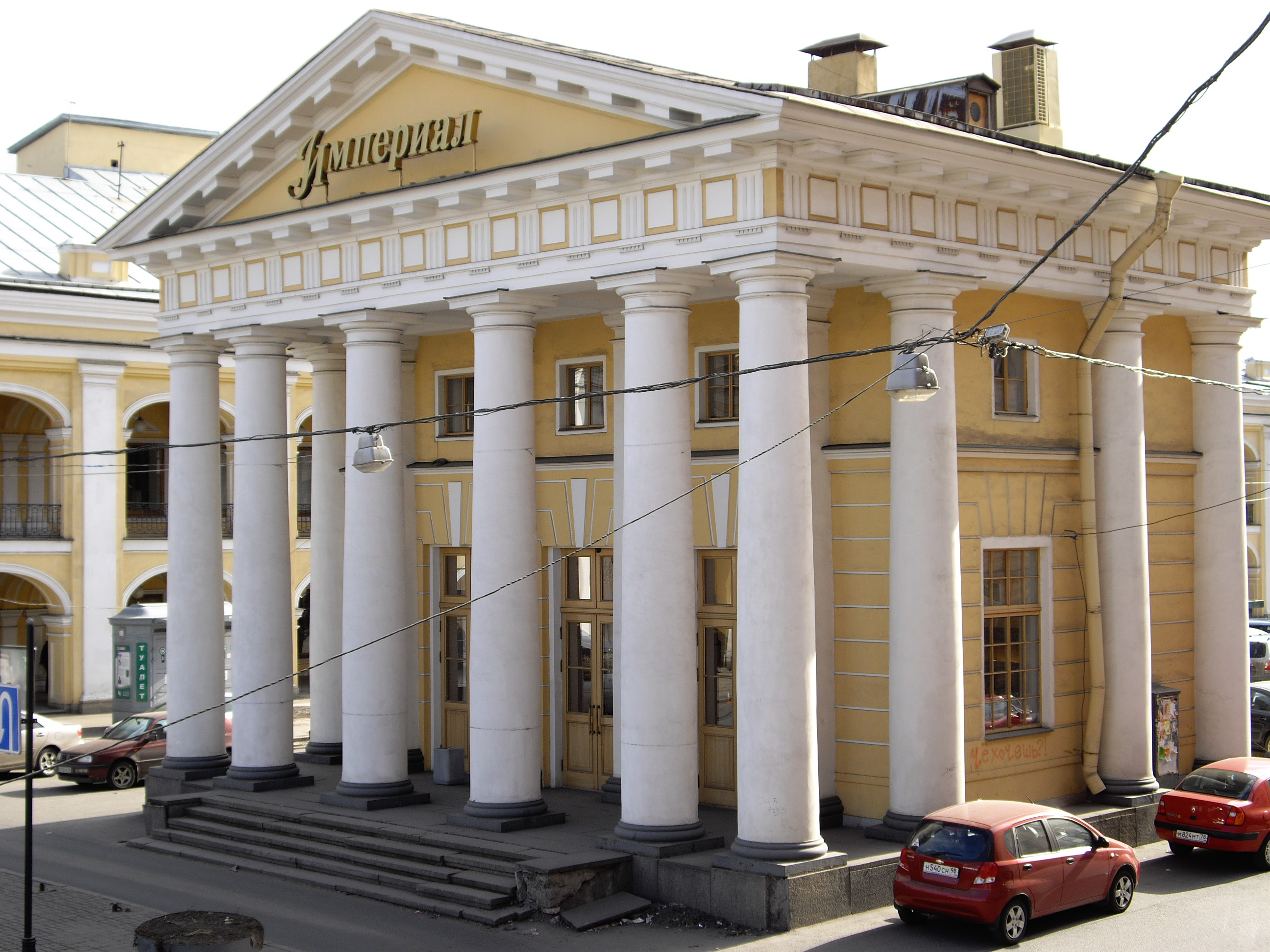
The Rusca Portico on Nevsky Avenue

Several boulevards in St. Petersburg (including the modern-day Admiralty Garden) and the Neoclassical interiors at Ropsha, Gatchina, and the Anichkov Palace are also the work of Luigi Rusca and his associates.

In 1810, Rusca published an album of Standardised Facades for Private Two- and Three-storeyed Houses in Towns throughout Russia. Many of his designs lacked originality and were never carried out.

In addition to his construction work, Rusca published more than 14 books, mostly works containing designs and plans for building projects.

Among the surviving buildings he designed are:

- the Skorbyashchenskaya Church in St. Petersburg;
- the Bobrinsky Palace on the Moika Embankment;
- the Zubov family mausoleum in Strelna;
- the Nikolskaya Tower of the Moscow Kremlin;
- the Nizhyn Lyceum;
- the Hostynnyi Dvir in Podil, Kyiv;
- the triumphal arches in Novocherkassk and Dikanka.

== Gallery ==
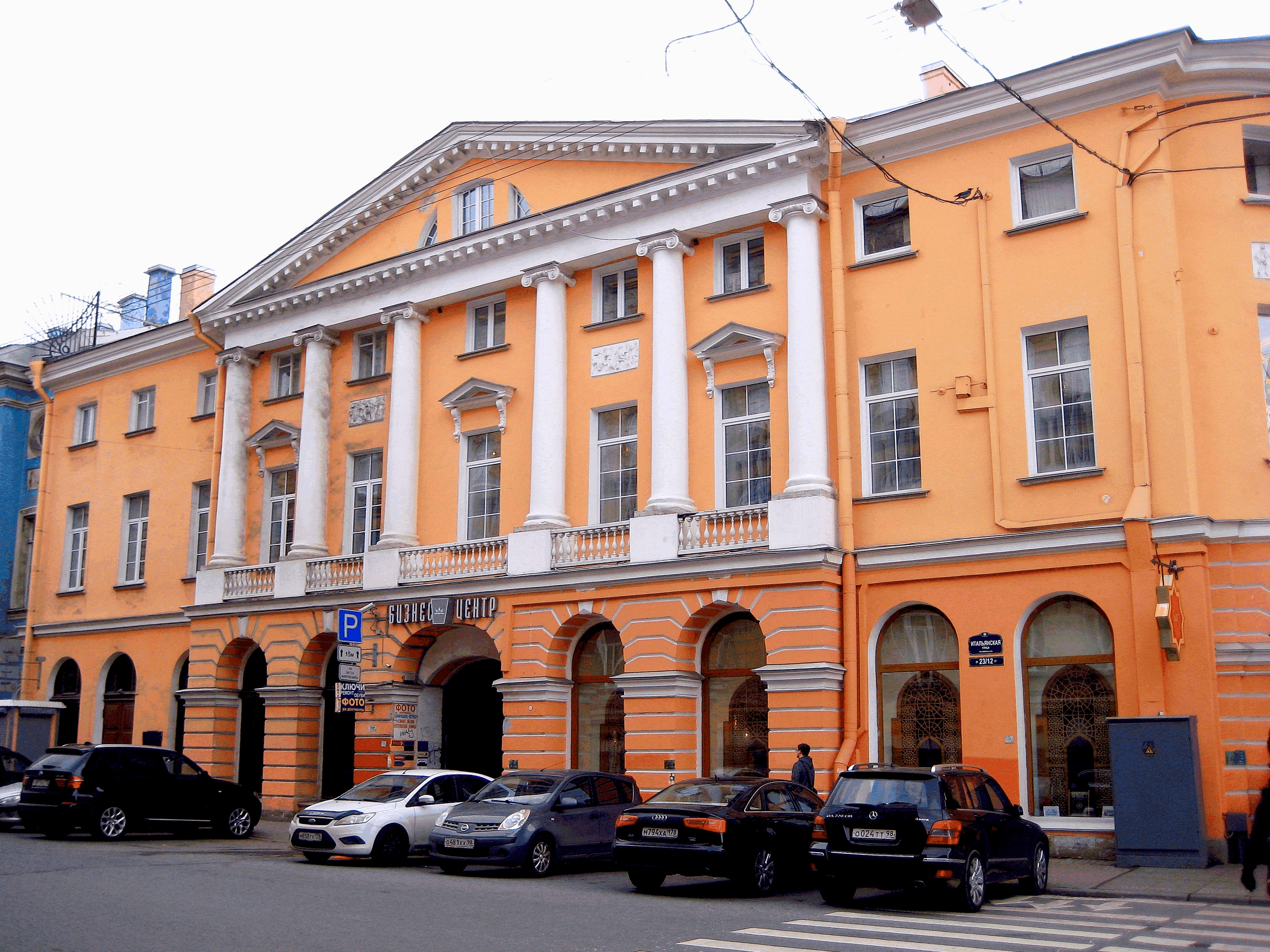
House of the Expedition of State Revenues (house with four colonnades) (architect: Luigi Rusca

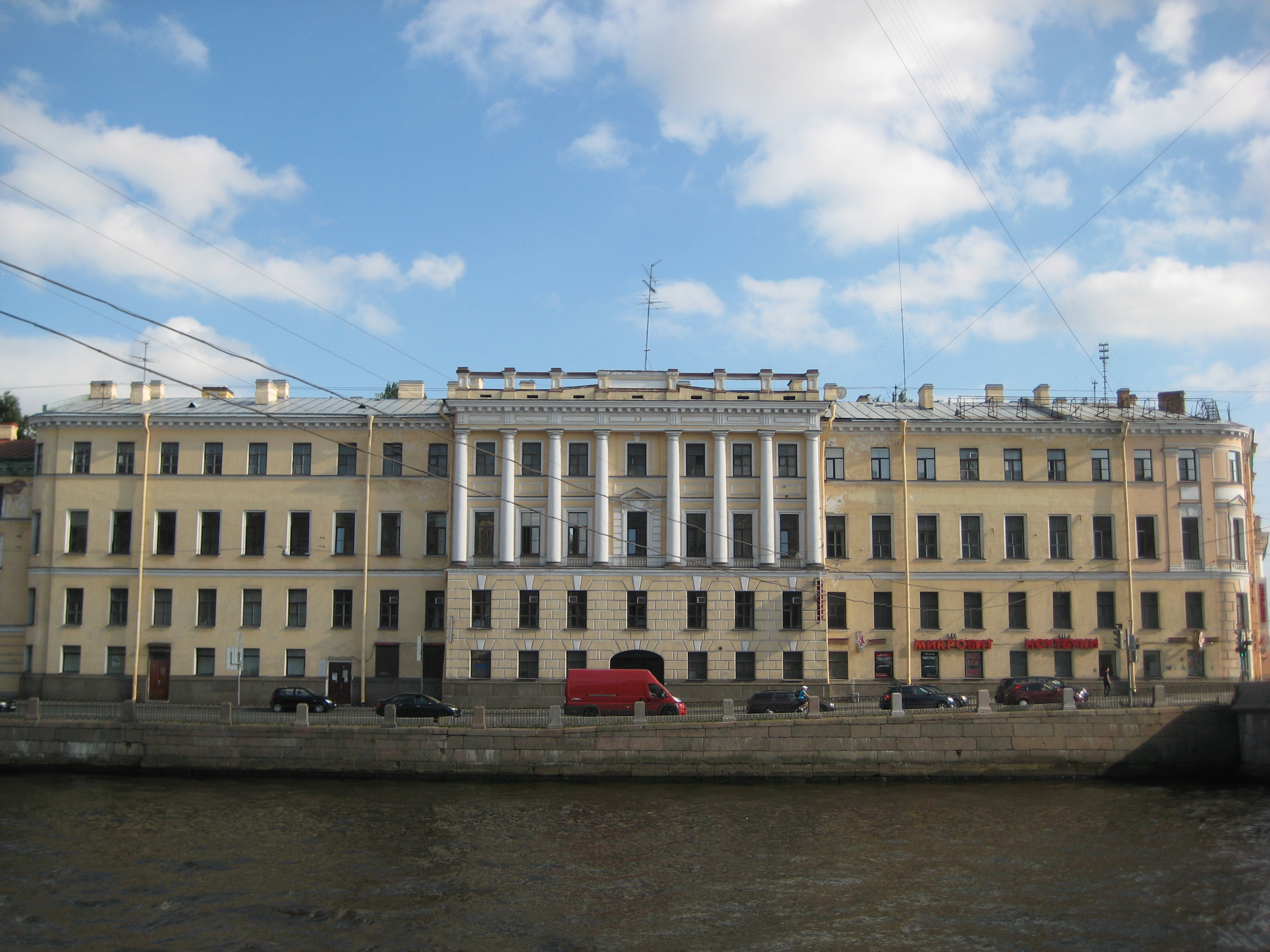
Fontanka Embankment, St. Petersburg

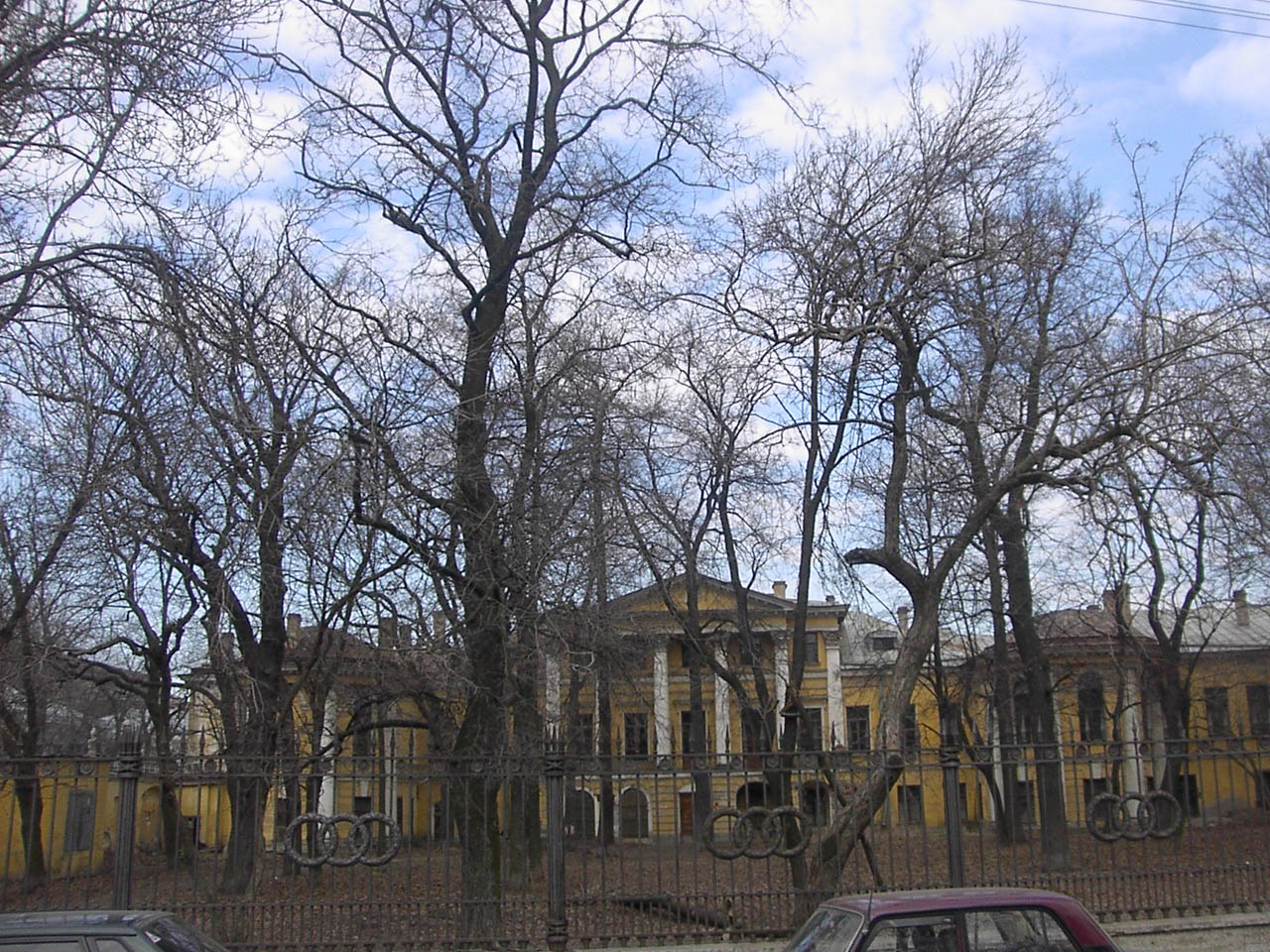
Admiralty Canal Embassy, Bobrinskih

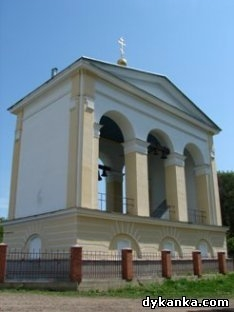
The bell tower of St. Nicholas Church in Dykanka

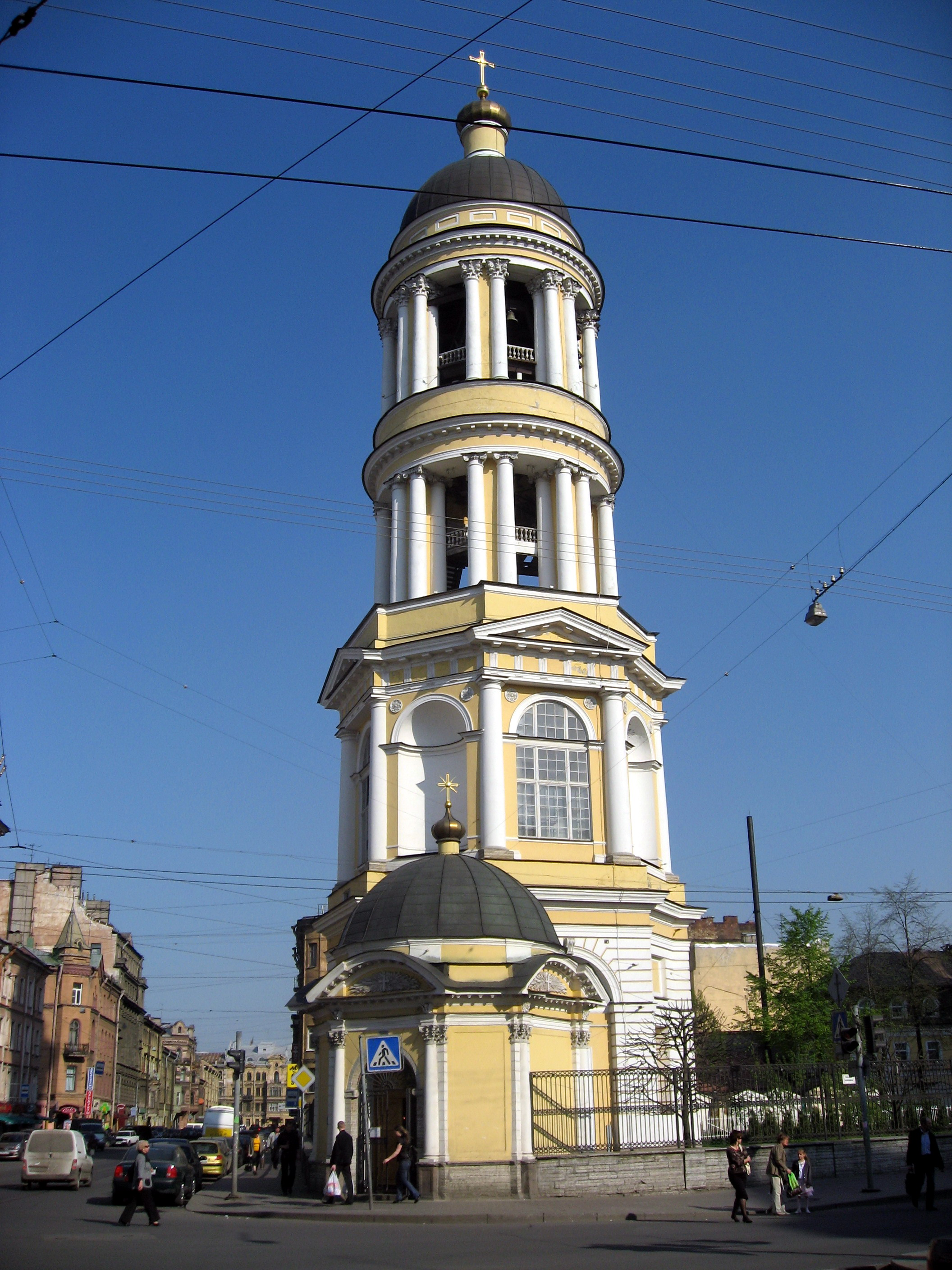
Bell tower of Vladimirskaya Church, Saint Petersburg

== See also ==
- Russian architecture
