= Albani lion =

Roman statue

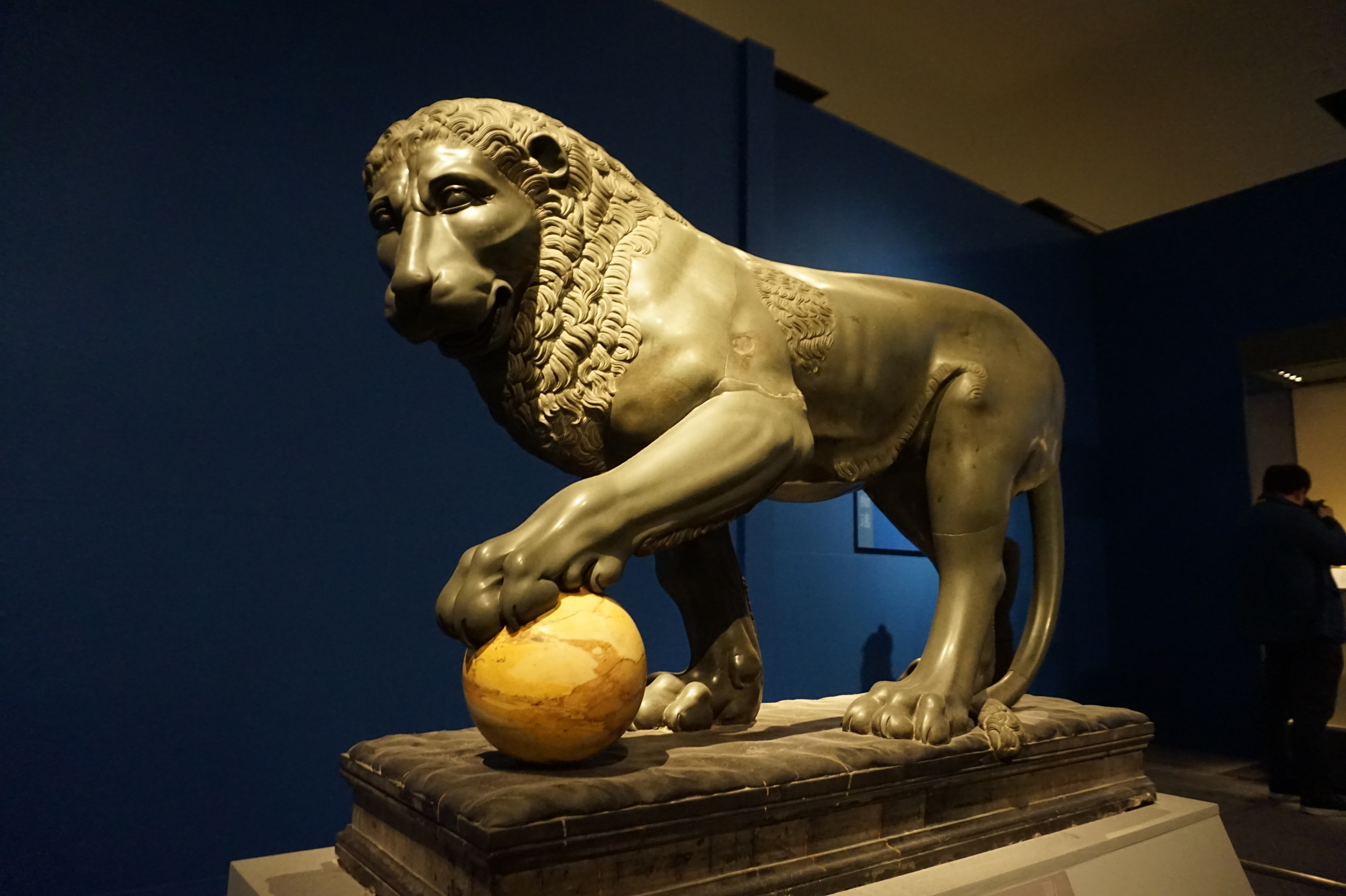
The Albani lion

The Albani lion is a first-century Roman green basalt lion statue with a yellow marble sphere under one paw, in the Albani Collection in the Denon Wing of the Louvre (inventory number Ma 1355) in Paris, France.

The Albani lion is possibly a reproduction of an earlier Greek bronze statue, as basalt was used in the first century AD for reproductions of Greek bronzes.

== See also ==
- Medici lions
- Marzocco
- Cultural depictions of lions
- Chinese guardian lions

== Literature ==
- Richard Delbrueck: Antike Porphyrwerke, Berlin/Leipzig 1932 (Studien zur spätantiken Kunstgeschichte 6), page 60 (in German, referenced on Google Books and uni-koeln.de)
