= The Child Canova Modeling a Lion out of Butter =

Painting by Pinckney Marcius-Simons

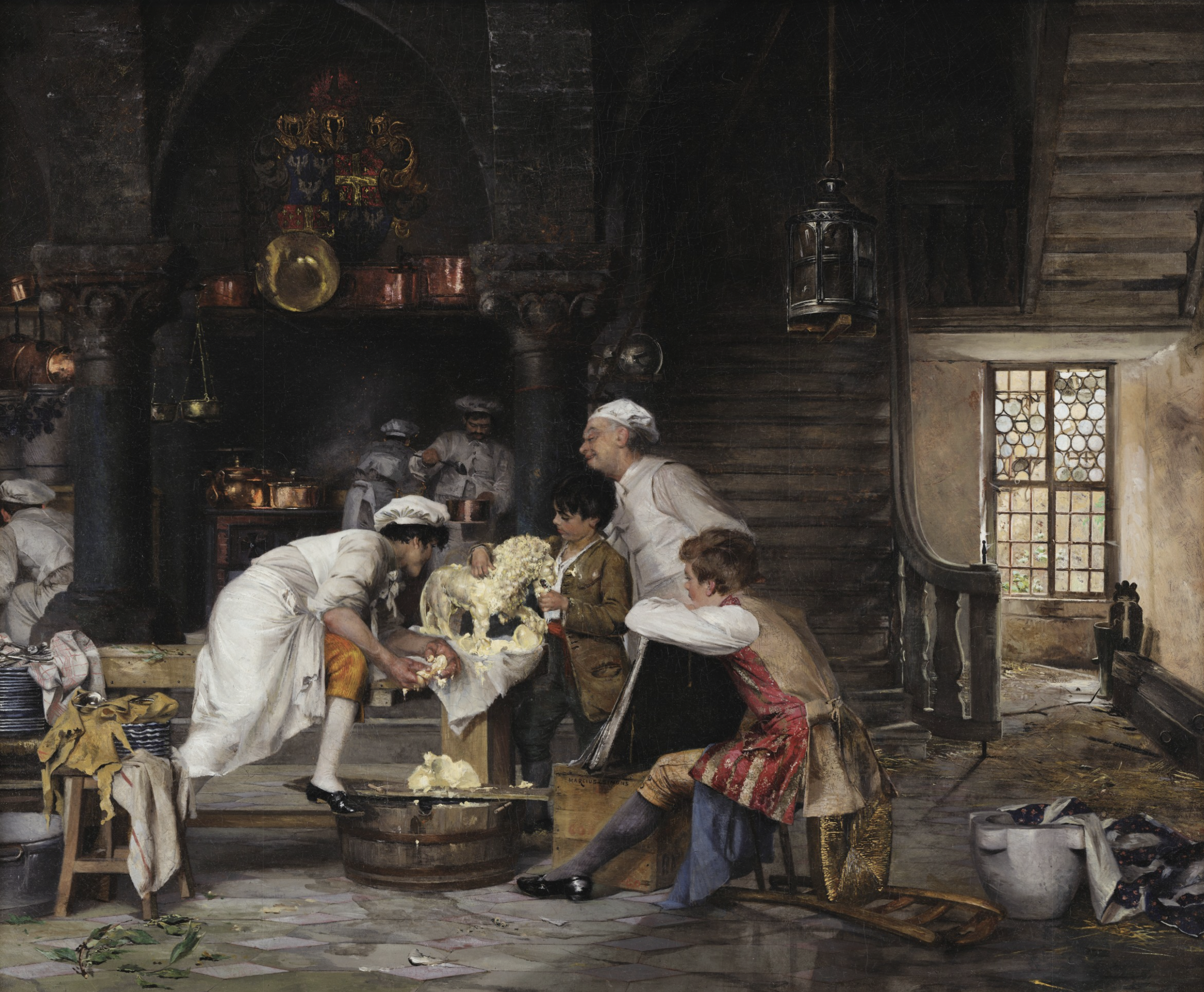
- Artist: Pinckney Marcius-Simons
- Year: c. 1885
- Medium: Oil on canvas
- Dimensions: 60.3 cm × 73.7 cm (23.7 in × 29.0 in)
- Location: Chrysler Museum of Art; Norfolk, Virginia, USA

The Child Canova Modeling a Lion out of Butter is a c. 1885 oil on canvas painting by Pinckney Marcius-Simons (1865–1909). The work was executed in the artist's youth and helped to bring him to the attention of the art critic George William Sheldon who wrote about the artist in his volume Recent Ideals of American Art.

The painting depicts preparations underway for a large feast wherein one of the servants, a boy has volunteered to mold the semblance of a lion from butter. The work celebrates the prodigious child for his remarkable talents and that this boy went on to become the sculptor known as Antonio Canova (1757–1822). The lion molded closely resembles one of the Medici Lions.

The painting is held in the permanent collection of the Chrysler Museum of Art in Norfolk, Virginia. The work was included in the 2021–2022 exhibition Sargent, Whistler and Venetian Glass: American Artists and the Magic of Murano at the Smithsonian American Art Museum in Washington DC.
