= Vasily Kreitan =

Russian sculptor (1832–1896)

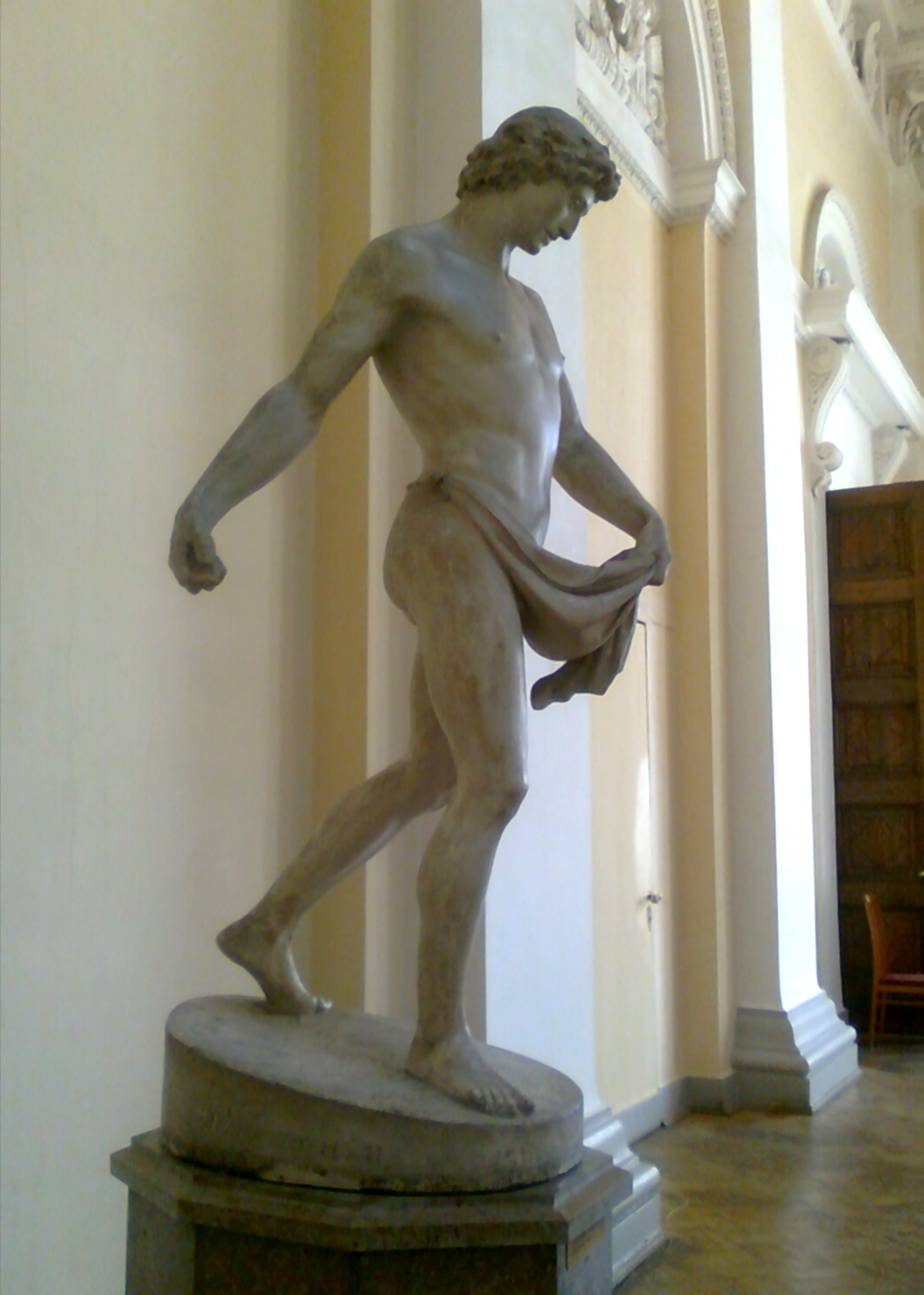
The Sower, 1862, plaster; Russian Museum, St. Petersburg, shown as photographed by Sofya Bagdasarova

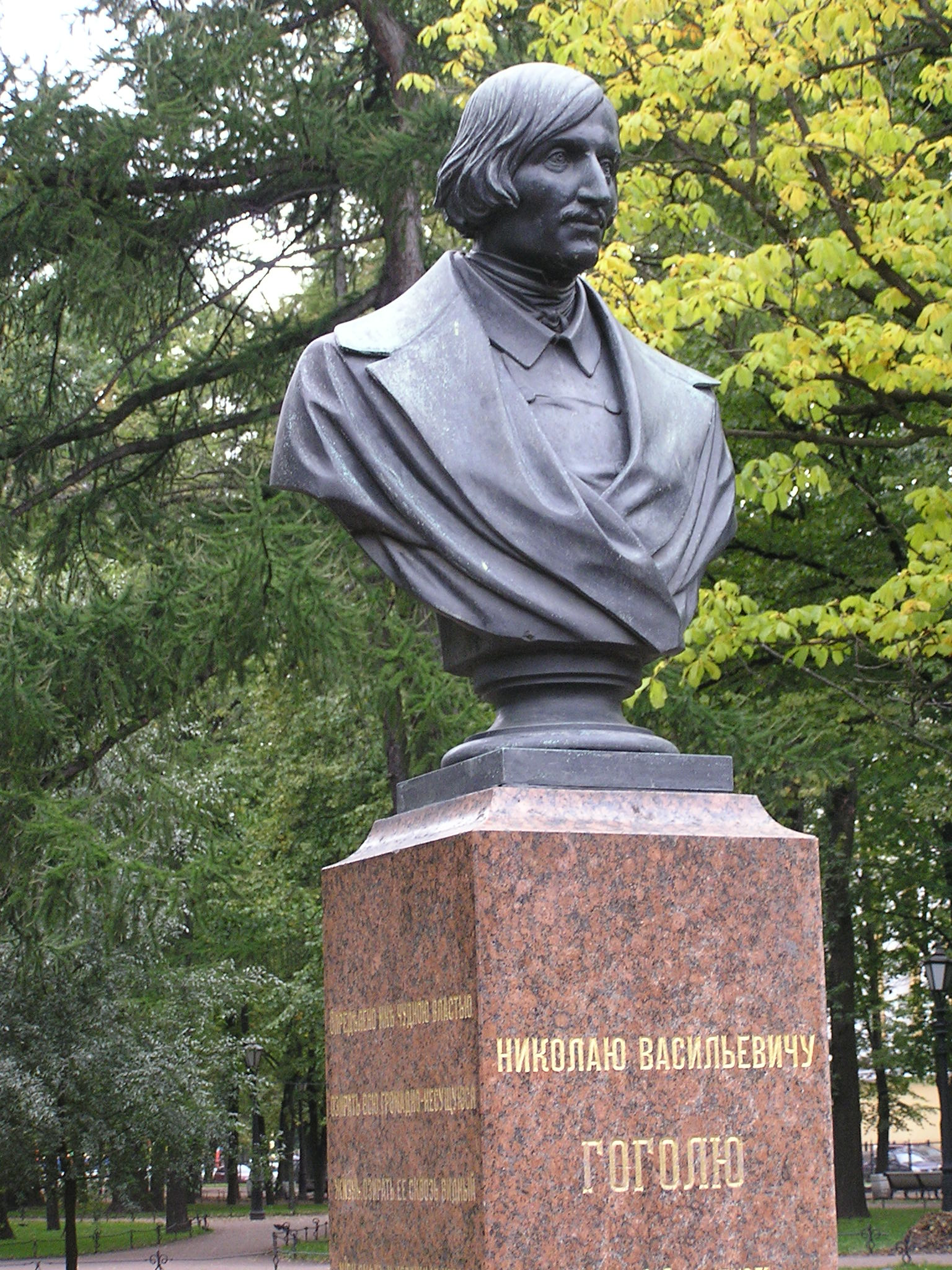
Nikolai Gogol, 1892–1896, bronze bust; Alexander Garden, St. Petersburg, shown as photographed by Andrey Butko

Wilhelm Ferdinand Kreitan, commonly russified as Vasily Petrovich Kreitan (Russian: Васи́лий Петро́вич Крейта́н; 1832, Hamina — 10 June 1896, Saint Petersburg) was a Russian sculptor of Huguenot descent, active in St. Petersburg during Tsars Alexander II and Alexander III's reigns.

== Biography ==
He was born in what is now Finland to a sculptor of Huguenot origin named Peter Kreitan, who participated in the restoration of the Winter Palace after the fire of 1837, and began his education at Saint Peter's School.

In 1858, he enrolled at the Imperial Academy of Arts, where he studied sculpture with Pyotr Clodt and Nikolai Pimenov. In 1862, he won a gold medal for his sculpture The Sower, now on display at the Russian Museum. The following year, he was admitted to a competition being held in honor of Catherine the Great's Centennial. Shortly after, however, a student protest now known as the "Revolt of the Fourteen" began, in opposition to the Academy's insistence on teaching what they felt was the outmoded Classical style. Kreitan was not one of the original thirteen protestors, but joined in solidarity when he saw how poorly they were being treated. All fourteen resigned and accepted the title of "Artist Second Class". Afterwards, he was one of the founding members of the Artel of Artists, an artistic commune.

In 1869, he participated in an exhibition at the Academy and was awarded the title of "Artist First Class". He became a drawing teacher at the Page Corps, taught sculpture at the "Imperial Society for the Encouragement of the Arts" from 1870 to 1891, and gave private lessons. By the end of his life, Kreitan was honored with the title of State Councillor.

In 1880, the city of Saint Petersburg decided to establish a sculpture park, with busts of prominent figures from the sciences and arts, in the Alexander Garden, with a selection committee headed by Nicholas Benois. Originally, sixteen busts were planned, but there were concerns that it might look like a cemetery, so only four were finally proposed. In 1884, Kreitan won the commission for a bust of Vasily Zhukovsky, which was dedicated in 1887. Four years later, he was chosen to do the bust of Mikhail Lermontov and, the following year, the bust of Nikolai Gogol. Both were completed just before his death in 1896.
