= Lions at the Dvortsovaya pier =

Sculptures in Saint Petersburg, Russia

Coordinates: 59°56′23″N 30°18′32″E

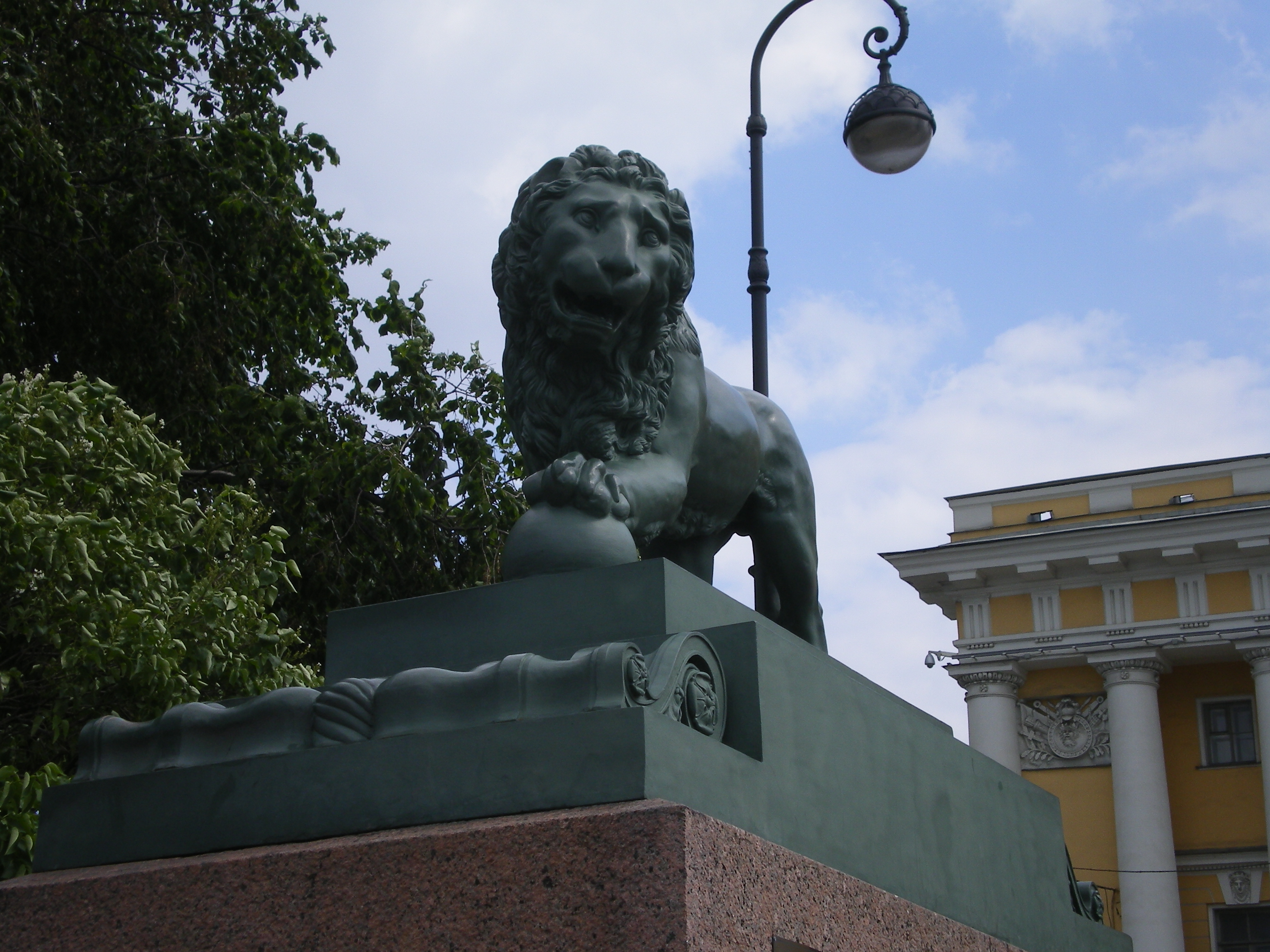
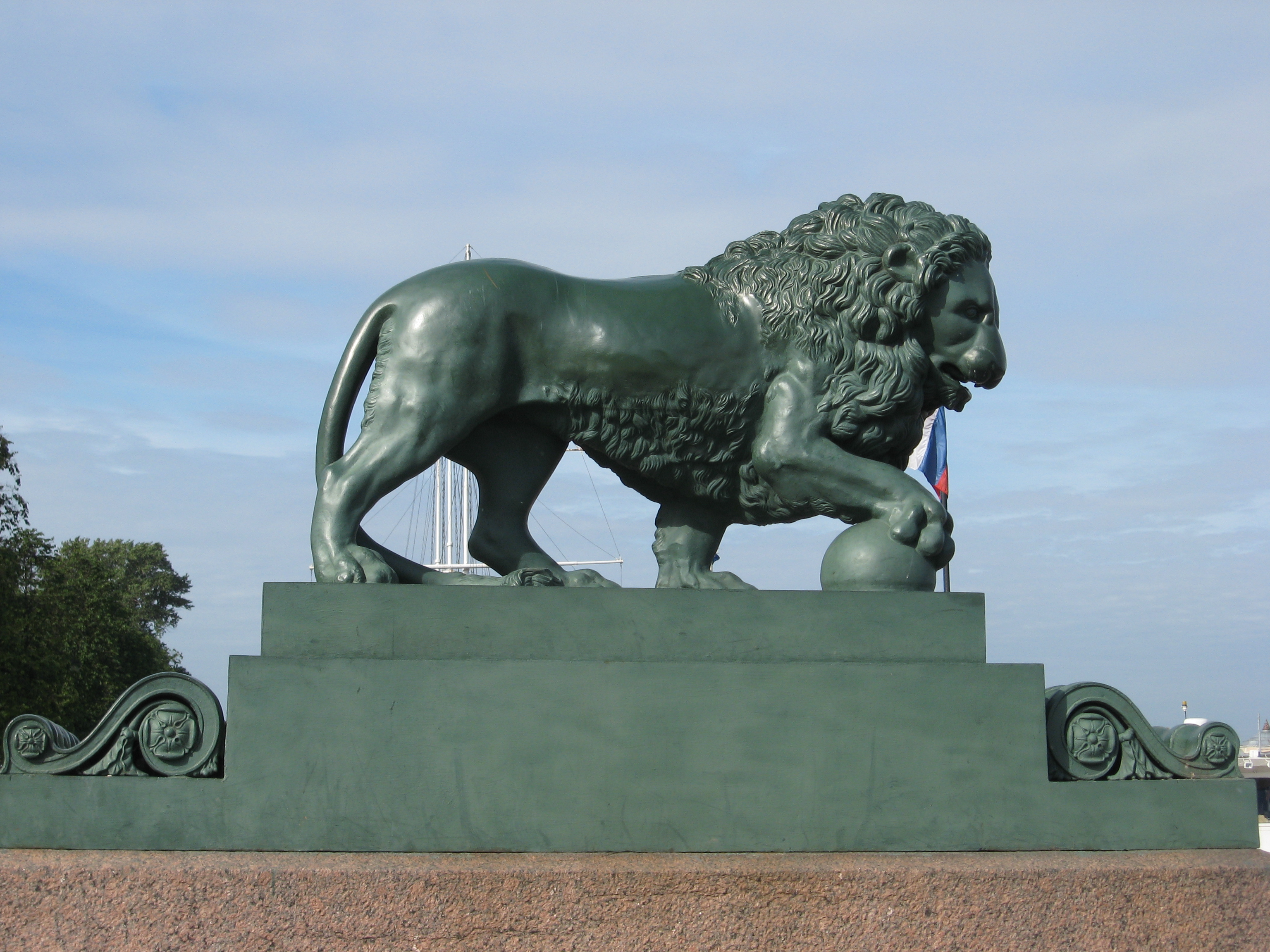
One of the lion sculptures, front and side view

The Lions at the Dvortsovaya pier are two lion sculptures in bronze placed at the Admiralty embankment in Saint Petersburg since 1832. The lions are copies of the late 16th century Italian Medici lions in Florence.

The lions are the best known among several Medici lions and other lion sculptures in Saint Petersburg. The sculptures were created by the German craftsman, Johan Gottlieb Prang to designs by sculptor Ivan Prokofiev.
