= Admiralty Embankment =

Street in Saint Petersburg, Russia

Coordinates: 59.9384°N 30.3055°E

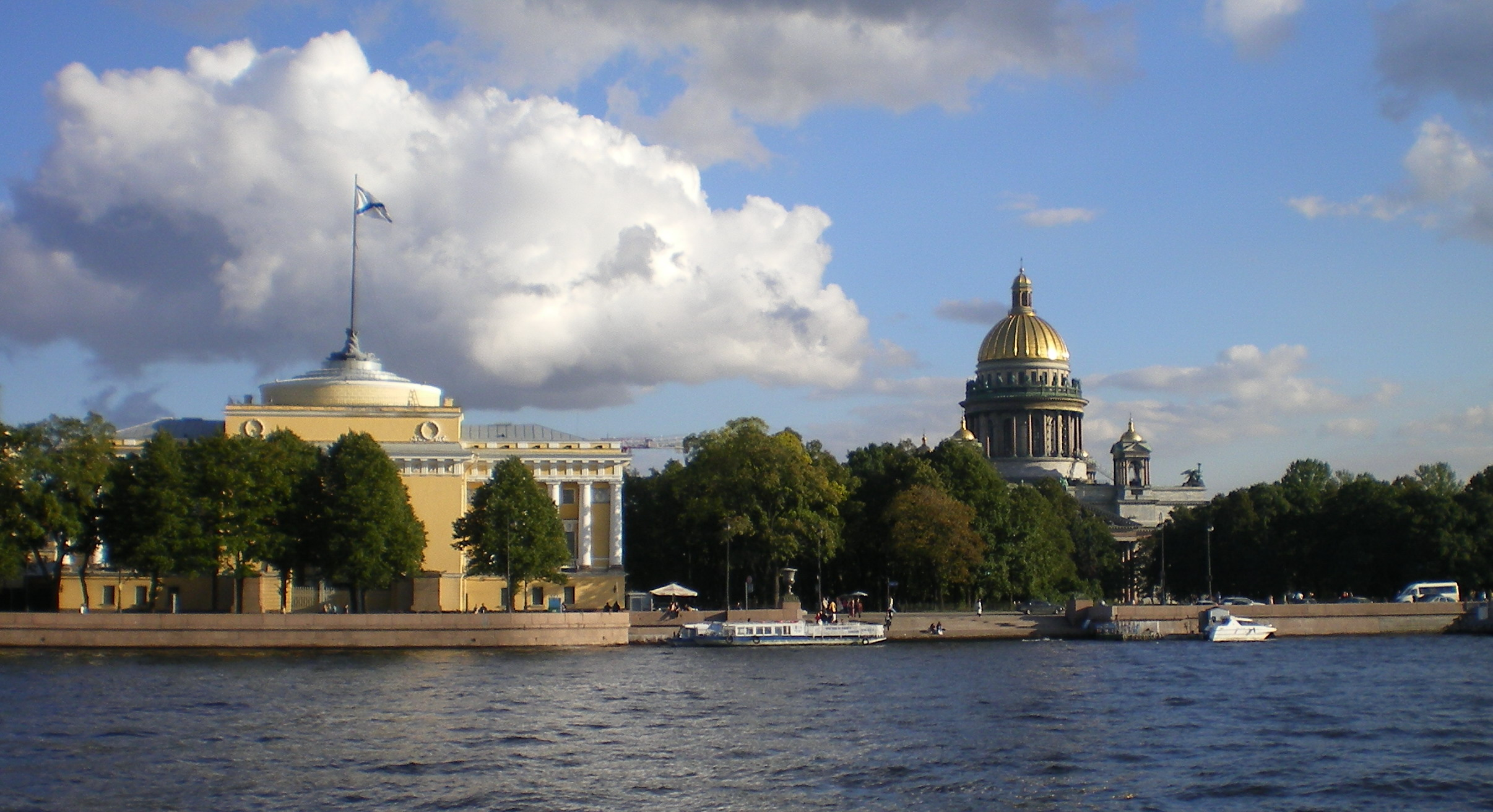

The Admiralty Embankment (Russian: Адмиралтейская набережная, romanized: Admiralteyskaya naberezhnaya) or Admiralty Quay is a street along the Neva River in Central Saint Petersburg, named after the Admiralty Board. It is a short embankment (630 meters) built at the former site of the 18th-century Admiralty Shipyard.

== Name ==
Between 1919 and 1944 the street was known as Roshal Embankment, named after the revolutionary S. G. Roshal.

== History ==
The Admiralty Embankment was constructed in 1763 to 1767, by the engineers V. M. Karlowicz and S. S. Selyavionov. The street has no other buildings than the Admiralty and the Bronze Horseman.

The street begins at the Decembrists Square, where the English Embankment becomes the Admiralty Embankment. The street ends at the Palace Bridge, where it becomes the Palace Embankment.

The Admiralty Embankment is home to the Admiralty building and the Bronze Horseman, it has also a wonderful view of the Neva and the Saint Petersburg State University is just across the Neva.

== See also ==
- Lions at the Dvortsovaya pier
